= List of former members of the Mississippi State Senate =

Members of the Mississippi State Senat

The Mississippi State Senate is the upper house of the Mississippi Legislature. It first met in 1817 and currently has 52 members in each session.

Sources used in list

1817–1916

1846

1848

1886

1888

1896

1900–1904

1904–1908

1908–1912

1912–1916

1916–1920

1920–1924

1924–1928

1932–1936

1928–1932, 1936–1984

1984–1988

1988–1992

1992–1993

1993–1996

1996–2000

2000–2004

2004–2008

2008–2012

2012–2016

2016–2020

2020–2024

| Senator | Years | County | Party | Lifespan |
|---|---|---|---|---|
| Richard Abbay | 1900–1904 | Tunica | Democratic | 1838–1919 |
| F. M. Abbott | 1870–1874 | Chickasaw, Monroe | Republican | 1843–1908 |
| Walter P. Abbott | 1920–1924 | Adams | Democratic | 1887–1967 |
| Joel M. Acker | 1846 1854–1856 | Monroe | Democratic | 1815–1892 |
| Benjamin C. Adams | 1900–1904 | Yalobusha, Grenada | Democratic | 1847–1906 |
| Daniel Weisiger Adams | 1852–1856 | Hinds | | 1821–1872 |
| Jesse A. Adams | 1928–1932 | 26th | Democratic | 1876–1940 |
| John Jefferson Adams | 1908–1912 | Chickasaw, Calhoun, Pontotoc | Democratic | 1860–1935 |
| Lawrence Adams | 1948–1960 | Adams | Democratic | 1914–1994 |
| Marshal T. Adams | 1916–1924 | 31st | Democratic | 1886–1987 |
| N. Q. Adams | 1896–1900 | Oktibbeha, Choctaw | Democratic | 1839–1922 |
| Simeon R. Adams | 1844–1848 | Jasper, Newton, Scott, Smith | Democratic | 1813/14–1860 |
| W. C. Adams | 1928–1936 | 37th | Democratic | 1888–1972 |
| George W. Albright | 1874–1878 | Marshall | Republican | 1846–1944 |
| Sidney Albritton | 2004–2012 | Marion, Pearl River, Walthall | Republican | 1971– |
| James L. Alcorn | 1848–1856 | Coahoma, Tallahatchie, Panola | Whig | 1816–1894 |
| John E. Aldridge | 1944–1948 | Montgomery, Carroll | Democratic | 1912–2007 |
| E. M. Alexander | 1873–1874 | Benton, Tippah, Union | Democratic | 1830–1906 |
| W. B. Alexander Sr. | 1952–1960 | Bolivar | Democratic | 1894–1960 |
| William B. Alexander | 1960–1984 | Bolivar | Democratic | 1921–2006 |
| Henry Allen Jr. | 1854–1856 | Calhoun, Yalobusha | Democratic | 1823/24–1856 |
| Carl C. Allen | 1944–1952 | DeSoto | Democratic | 1888–1965 |
| James P. Allen | 1892–1896 | Attala | Democratic | 1848–1922 |
| Percy W. Allen | 1932–1940 | Humphreys, Sunflower, Washington | Democratic | 1889–1943 |
| R. H. Allen | 1872–1880 | Itawamba, Lee | Democratic | 1840–1895 |
| Hanson Alsbury | 1836–1842 | Greene and others | Democratic | 1801–1857 |
| Albert C. Anderson | 1912–1916 | Union, Benton, Tippah, Marshall, Tate | Democratic | 1878–1954 |
| Bob Anderson | 1960–1968 | Chickasaw, Clay | Democratic | 1930–1998 |
| Doug Anderson | 1980–1992 | Hinds | Democratic | 1939–2013 |
| George Anderson | 1918–1920 | 12th | Democratic | 1856–1926 |
| J. H. Anderson | 1865–1866 | Monroe | | |
| Thomas Anderson | 1822 | Lawrence | | |
| Vernon F. Anderson | 1940–1944 | 26th | Democratic | 1899–1985 |
| William Dozier Anderson | 1908–1912 | Monroe, Lee, Itawamba | Democratic | 1862–1952 |
| W. S. Anderson | 1880–1882 | Issaquena, Sharkey, Washington | | |
| Landon C. Andrews | 1932–1936 | 32nd | Democratic | 1880–? |
| Homer B. Appleton | 1952–1956 | Marshall, Benton, Tippah, Union, Tate | Democratic | 1900–1997 |
| Crowell Armstrong | 1992–1996 | Chickasaw, Clay, Calhoun | Democratic | |
| W. D. Arnold | 1940–1944 | 23rd | Democratic | 1867–? |
| Richard Olney Arrington | 1932–1940 | Copiah | Democratic | 1897–1963 |
| A. H. Arthur | 1854–1859 | Warren | | |
| George B. Augustus | 1837 1842 | Winston, Noxubee | | |
| R. P. Austin | 1886–1890 | Newton, Scott, Neshoba | Democratic | 1835–? |
| Elond E. Autry | 1940–1944 | 36th | Democratic | 1901–1987 |
| Buck Bacot | 1952 | Pike, Franklin | Democratic | 1919–? |
| Hugh Bailey | 1960–1964 | Montgomery, Carroll | Democratic | 1924–1989 |
| John A. Bailey | 1908–1916 | Lauderdale | Democratic | 1858–? |
| John B. Bailey | 1900–1904 | Scott, Newton | Democratic | 1843–? |
| Thomas Rupert Baird | 1908–1912 | Yalobusha, Grenada | Democratic | 1850–? |
| Dennis Baker | 1960–1964 | Panola | Democratic | 1927–2014 |
| J. Holmes Baker | 1892–1896 | Washington, Sunflower | | |
| Joseph A. Baker | 1916–1918 | 12th | Democratic | 1883–1959 |
| Hezekiah J. Balch | 1817 | Jefferson | | |
| Alonzo C. Ball | 1920–1924 | 24th | Democratic | 1865–? |
| H. N. Ballard | 1870–1871 | DeSoto | | |
| J. I. Ballenger | 1900 | Chickasaw, Calhoun, Pontotoc | | 1853–? |
| George Hansel Banks | 1908–1912 | Scott, Newton | Democratic | 1876–? |
| M. A. Banks | 1854–1858 | Copiah, Simpson | | |
| J. W. Barbee | 1916–1918 1924–1928 | 35th | Democratic | 1885–1956 |
| Frank Barber | 1960–1964 | Forrest, Perry | Democratic | 1929–1997 |
| David Baria | 2008–2012 | Hancock, Harrison | Democratic | 1962– |
| E. C. Barlow | 1928–1932 | Lincoln, Lawrence | Democratic | 1888–1957 |
| Frank D. Barlow | 1944–1960 | Copiah | Democratic | 1891–1982 |
| Bert J. Barnett | 1936–1940 | Leake, Neshoba | Democratic | 1884–1949 |
| James A. Barnett | 1964–1972 | Hinds | Democratic | 1924–? |
| Juan Barnett | 2016–2026 | Forrest, Jasper, Jones | Democratic | 1970– |
| Jason Barrett | 2020– | Copiah, Lawrence, Lincoln, Walthall | Republican | 1978– |
| John H. Barrett | 1920–1924 | 10th | Democratic | 1872–? |
| James W. Barron | 1886–1890 | Clay, Choctaw, Oktibbeha, Webster | Democratic | 1859–? |
| Peter Barnabas Barrow | 1872–1873 | Warren | Republican | 1840–1906 |
| Bartlett C. Barry | 1822–1826 | Wayne, Covington, Monroe | | |
| Frederick G. Barry | 1876–1880 1908–1909 | Clay, Oktibbeha, Lowndes | Democratic | 1845–1909 |
| George M. Batchelor | 1886–1890 | Warren | Democratic | 1850–? |
| Wyatt C. Batson | 1924–1928 | 1st | Democratic | 1883–1946 |
| Stephen Beach III | 1972–1976 | Hinds | Democratic | 1942– |
| Jim Bean | 1986–2000 | Forrest, Lamar, Perry | Republican | 1932–2013 |
| G. L. Beavers | 1948–1952 | George, Greene, Jackson | Democratic | 1899–? |
| Russel O. Beene | 1844–1857 | Pontotoc, Itawamba | Democratic | 1812/13–? |
| William Beene | 1857–1859 | Itawamba | | |
| Fred M. Belk | 1968–1972 | Marshall, Lafayette | Democratic | 1937–2012 |
| William A. Belk | 1904–1908 | Union, Tippah, Benton, Marshall, Tate | Democratic | 1860–1919 |
| Jefferson C. Bell | 1924–1928 | 5th | Democratic | 1862–? |
| John Bell | 1837–1841 | Chickasaw, Itawamba, Pontotoc | | |
| Joseph Bell | 1842–1844 | Noxubee, Winston | Democratic | c. 1810–1885 |
| Percy Bell | 1920–1924 | 29th | Democratic | 1873–? |
| Irb Benjamin | 1984–1992 | Alcorn, Tishomingo | Democratic | 1946–2022 |
| Joseph Bennett | 1852–1854 1870–1876 | Rankin, Smith Hinds, Rankin, Simpson | Republican | 1816–1882 |
| Louis A. Benoist | 1924–1928 | 9th | Democratic | 1852–1932 |
| Andy Berry | 2024– | Copiah, Jefferson Davis, Lawrence, Simpson | Republican | |
| J. H. Berry | 1850–1857 | Tippah | | |
| Claude Bilbo | 1988–1993 | Jackson | Democratic | 1941–2005 |
| Theodore G. Bilbo | 1908–1912 | Simpson, Covington, Marion, Pearl River, Lamar | Democratic | 1877–1947 |
| John D. Bills | 1877–1882 | Alcorn, Prentiss, Tishomingo | | |
| J. A. Binford | 1865–1867 | Carroll | | |
| James R. Binford | 1886–1890 | Carroll, Leflore, Montgomery | Democratic | 1839–? |
| Adam Lewis Bingaman | 1822 1825–1826 1838–1840 | Adams | Whig | 1793–1869 |
| G. K. Birchett | 1880–1882 | Warren | | |
| Barbara Blackmon | 1992–2003 2016–2024 | Attala, Holmes, Leake, Madison, Yazoo | Democratic | 1955– |
| Bradford Blackmon | 2024– | Attala, Holmes, Leake, Madison | Democratic | 1988/89– |
| Kevin Blackwell | 2016– | DeSoto, Marshall | Republican | 1954– |
| Wiley A. Blair | 1924–1928 1932–1936 | 38th | Democratic | 1884–1955 |
| Barbara Blanton | 1988–1992 | Rankin | Republican | 1937– |
| Horace Bloomfield | 1890–1894 1904–1908 | Hancock, Harrison, Jackson | Democratic | 1855–1944 |
| David Blount | 2008– | Hinds | Democratic | 1967– |
| James A. Blount | 1916–1917 1944–1948 | Yalobusha, Grenada | Democratic | 1884–1974 |
| Franklin P. Boatner | 1920–1928 | Marshall | Democratic | 1852–1930 |
| Van Buren Boddie | 1912–1920 1928 | Washington, Sunflower | Democratic | 1869–1928 |
| Ellis B. Bodron | 1952–1984 | Warren | Democratic | 1923–1997 |
| Thomas K. Boggan | 1916–1920 | 38th | Democratic | 1880–1958 |
| Buddy Bond | 1985–1992 | Attala, Carroll, Choctaw, Montgomery, Leake, Webster | Republican | 1932– |
| James Bond | 1842–1846 | Choctaw | | |
| Andrew W. Bond | 1912–1916 | Hancock, Harrison, Jackson | Democratic | 1876–? |
| Oscar L. Bond | 1932–1936 | Harrison, Stone | Democratic | 1895–? |
| Caleb D. Bonney | 1841 | Yazoo | | |
| F. M. Boone | 1882–1890 | Tishomingo, Alcorn, Prentiss | Democratic | 1849–? |
| R. H. Boone | 1846–1850 1856–1860 | Tishomingo | Democrat | 1792/93–? |
| William Booth | 1844–1848 | Carroll | Whig | 1802/03–? |
| J. B. Boothe | 1886–1890 | Panola | Democratic | 1844–? |
| Hugh Boren | 1948–1952 1956–1960 | Monroe, Lee, Itawamba | Democratic | 1898–1964 |
| James E. Bost | 1971–1976 | Benton, Pontotoc, Union | Democratic | 1928–1987 |
| Joseph Bowman | 1819 | Adams | | |
| Eaton J. Bowers | 1896–1900 | Hancock, Harrison, Jefferson | Democratic | 1865–1939 |
| Countelow M. Bowles | 1872–1874 | Bolivar, Coahoma | Republican | 1840–? |
| James R. Bowles | 1861–1865 | Lafayette | | |
| William C. Bowman | 1916–1920 | 9th | Democratic | 1882–1974 |
| Dan Boyce | 1972–1976 | Rankin | Democratic | 1938– |
| Gordan Boyd | 1837–1840 1844 | Attala, Neshoba | | |
| John D. Boyd | 1844 | Leake, Neshoba | | |
| Nicole Akins Boyd | 2020– | Lafayette | Republican | |
| William A. Boyd | 1884–1888 1896–1900 1904–1908 | Union, Tippah, Benton, others | Democratic | 1833–1911 |
| Marion E. Boyles | 1960–1964 | Leflore, Tallahatchie | Democratic | 1925–1991 |
| Benjamin Bradford | 1857 | Monroe | | |
| John D. Bradford | 1848 | Pontotoc | Democratic | 1813/14–? |
| N. W. Bradford | 1916–1920 | 31st | Democratic | 1854–1926 |
| Richard L. Bradley | 1900–1904 | Hinds, Warren | Democratic | 1866–? |
| Henry Wallis Bradshaw | 1912–1916 1920–1924 1928–1932 | Rankin, Smith | Democratic | 1869–? |
| A. C. Bramlet | 1896–1900 | Leflore, Tallahatchie | Democratic | 1852/53–? |
| Barnie Bramlett | 1955–1956 | Oxford, Lafayette | Democratic | 1921–? |
| David C. Bramlette Jr. | 1924–1928 1932–1936 | Amite, Wilkinson | Democratic | 1888–1938 |
| Maxwell Bramlette | 1940–1944 1948–1952 | Amite, Wilkinson | Democratic | 1911–? |
| Gerard Brandon | 1906–1908 | Adams | Democratic | 1861–1956 |
| Jenifer Branning | 2016– | Leake, Neshoba, Winston | Republican | 1979– |
| L. Brasher | 1856–1861 | Calhoun, Yalobusha | | |
| Albert Herndon Brenham | 1880–1888 | Adams | Democratic | 1833–? |
| Eugene W. Breland | 1920–1924 | 41st | Democratic | 1870–? |
| L. E. Breland | 1940–1944 | 39th | Democratic | 1887–? |
| Robert Lee Breland | 1908–1912 | Leake, Neshoba | Democratic | 1870–? |
| Earl L. Brewer | 1896–1900 | Yalobusha, Grenada | Democratic | 1869–1942 |
| James E. Bridges | 1878–1880 | Choctaw, Winston, Webster | | |
| N. B. Bridges | 1874–1875 | Oktibbeha, Lowndes | | |
| Pat Bridges | 1952–1956 | Sunflower, Washington, Humphreys | Democratic | 1913–? |
| Eddie Briggs | 1984–1992 | Kemper, Lauderdale, Noxubee | Democratic | 1949– |
| Parmenas Briscoe | 1830–1831 1835 1844–1850 | Claiborne, Jefferson | Democratic | 1784–1851 |
| Clem Britton | 1952–1956 | Jones, Wayne | Democratic | 1904–? |
| Walker Brooke | 1850–1852 | Holmes, Sunflower | Whig | 1813–1869 |
| Harden H. Brooks Jr. | 1924–1928 | 14th | Democratic | 1877–? |
| J. W. Brooks | 1866 | Newton, Lauderdale | | |
| Thomas Norman Brooks | 1960–1964 1968–1985 | Leake, others | Democratic | 1924–1992 |
| Frederick Brougher | 1842–1846 | Tippah | | |
| E. R. Brown | 1861–1862 | Simpson, Copiah | | |
| G. N. Brown | 1932–1936 | Clarke, Jasper | Democratic | 1870–? |
| James Brown | 1865–1867 | Lafayette | | |
| John R. Brown | 1822–1827 | Franklin | | |
| John Wesley Brown | 1914–1916 | Yalobusha, Grenada | Democratic | 1846–? |
| Joseph N. Brown | 1918–1922 | 35th | Democratic | 1849–1922 |
| L. B. Brown | 1880–1882 | Clarke, Lauderdale | | |
| Lester Brown | 1924–1928 | Sharkey, Issaquena | Democratic | 1875–? |
| Silas Brown | 1835 | Hinds | | |
| Terry W. Brown | 2004–2014 | Lowndes | Republican | 1950–2014 |
| William M. Brown | 1837–1840 | Tallahatchie | | |
| W. N. Brown | 1837–1840 | Carroll | | |
| Nickey Browning | 1996–2020 | Benton, Pontotoc, Union | Republican | 1951– |
| Henry F. Broyles | 1892–1905 1912–1916 | Monroe, Lee, Itawamba | Democratic | 1865–? |
| Gary Brumfield | 2024– | Adams, Amite, Pike, Walthall, Wilkinson | Democratic | |
| Hob Bryan | 1984– | Itawamba, Lee, Monroe | Democratic | 1952– |
| William Buchanan | 1886–1890 | Rankin, Smith | Democratic | 1842–? |
| W. R. Buchanan | 1858–1861 | Tippah | | |
| C. L. Buck | 1859–1865 | Warren | | |
| Emmett Buckley | 1944–1948 | 3rd | Democratic | 1889–? |
| Mansard Bulloch | 1936–1940 | Yalobusha, Grenada | Democratic | 1908–? |
| J. E. Burch | 1944–1948 | 38th | Democratic | 1884–? |
| J. C. Burdine | 1888–1892 | Lee, Itawamba, Monroe | Democratic | 1848–? |
| William G. Burgin | 1952–1960 1964–1979 | Chickasaw, Clay, Lowndes | Democratic | 1924–2002 |
| William G. Burgin | 1936–1940 | Oktibbeha, Choctaw | Democratic | 1892–? |
| Wayne Burkes | 1980–1989 | Hinds | Democratic | 1929–2020 |
| H. L. Burkett | 1884–1888 | Clay, Choctaw, Oktibbeha | Democratic | 1818–? |
| Frank Burkitt | 1912–1914 | Chickasaw, Calhoun, Pontotoc | Democratic | 1843–1914 |
| Daniel Burnet | 1827 | Claiborne | | |
| Robert Burns Jr. | 1936–1940 | Rankin, Smith | Democratic | 1904–? |
| Terry C. Burton | 1992–2020 | Lauderdale, Newton, Scott | Republican | 1956– |
| C. R. Bush | 1936–1944 | Noxubee | Democratic | 1872–1958 |
| M. P. Bush | 1936–1940 | Jones, Wayne | Democratic | 1871–? |
| Fred Marshall Bush | 1908–1912 | Lincoln, Lawrence | Democratic | 1880–? |
| Albert Butler | 2010– | Claiborne, Copiah, Hinds, Jefferson | Democratic | 1947/8– |
| Chester Butler | 1972–1976 | Calhoun, Choctaw, Montgomery, Webster | Democratic | 1912–? |
| Decatur Butler | 1948–1952 | Pike, Franklin | Democratic | 1919–? |
| Decatur P. Butler | 1932 | 6th | Democratic | 1870–1932 |
| Kelvin Butler | 2004–2016 2021– | Adams, Amite, Pike, Walthall, Wilkinson | Democratic | 1956– |
| John C. Burrus | 1908–1912 | Bolivar | Democratic | 1847–? |
| John M. Byars | 1896–1900 | Chickasaw, Calhoun, Pontotoc | Democratic | 1839/40–? |
| Wilton Byars | 1956–1960 | Chickasaw, Calhoun, Pontotoc | Democratic | 1911–? |
| Adam M. Byrd | 1890–1896 | Scott, Newton, Neshoba | Democratic | 1859–1912 |
| Jesse M. Byrd | 1944–1948 | 41st | Democratic | 1896–? |
| Augustus M. Byrnes | 1928–1932 | 10th | Democratic | 1871–? |
| William C. Cage | 1831 | Marion, Pike | | |
| W. F. Cain | 1865–1867 | Lawrence, Pike | | |
| M. C. Calcote | 1940–1944 | 6th | Democratic | 1893–? |
| Charles Caldwell | 1870–1875 | Hinds, Rankin, Simpson | | 1830–1875 |
| Isaac Caldwell | 1831 | Hinds | | 1795–1836 |
| James L. Caldwell | 1972–1984 | Copiah, Lawrence, Simpson | Democratic | 1920–? |
| C. G. Callicott | 1876–1880 | DeSoto, Tate, Tunica | | |
| Samuel Calvitt | 1822–1823 | Hinds | | |
| John R. Cameron | 1888–1892 | Madison | Democratic | 1846–? |
| Herman Camp | 1960–1964 | Lee, Itawamba | Democratic | 1921–? |
| Bland Hayden Campbell | 1956–1972 | Hinds | Democratic | 1905–1989 |
| M. Campbell | 1872–1876 | Tunica, DeSoto, Tate (1875) | | |
| Robert B. Campbell | 1900–1904 | Washington, Sunflower | Democratic | 1853–? |
| Robert C. Campbell | 1840 | Yazoo | | |
| Thomas H. Campbell | 1912–1916 | Yazoo | Democratic | 1856–? |
| William R. Cannon | 1848–1850 | Oktibbeha, Chickasaw | Democratic | 1804/05–? |
| Bill Canon | 1979–2004 | Lowndes | Democratic Republican | 1930– |
| Walter W. Capers | 1936–1940 | Hinds, Warren | Democratic | 1905–? |
| Bill Caraway | 1960–1972 | Bolivar, Washington | Democratic | 1910–2004 |
| Neely C. Carlton | 1996–2004 | Bolivar, Sharkey, Washington | Democratic | 1970– |
| Videt Carmichael | 2000–2020 | Clarke, Lauderdale | Republican | 1950– |
| W. D. Carmichael | 1892–1896 | Hinds, Warren | | |
| John D. Carr | 1924–1928 | 13th | Democratic | 1871–? |
| Asa R. Carter | 1878–1882 | Newton, Scott, Jasper | | |
| Benjamin F. Carter | 1928–1932 | 2nd | Democratic | 1882–? |
| Brad Carter | 1996–2000 | Lauderdale | Republican | 1936–2024 |
| Henry Claud Carter | 1912–1916 | Kemper, Winston | Democratic | 1881–? |
| Joel R. Carter Jr. | 2018– | Harrison | Republican | 1978– |
| John Prentiss Carter | 1874–1882 | Hancock, Harrison, Jackson, Greene, Marion, Perry | Democratic | 1840–1925 |
| J. P. Carter | 1848–1852 | Lauderdale | | |
| William P. Carter | 1848–1850 | Newton | Democratic | 1807/08–? |
| C. K. Caruthers | 1890–1892 1894–1896 | Panola | | |
| Henry F. Case | 1928–1932 | 3rd | Democratic | 1893–? |
| D. C. Casey | 1886–1890 | Issaquena, Sharkey | Democratic | 1846–? |
| Hiram Cassedy Jr. | 1872–1874 | Lawrence, Lincoln, Pike | | |
| Delos H. Cassels | 1936–1940 | Amite, Wilkinson | Democratic | 1879–? |
| Nap Cassibry | 1968–1980 | Harrison | Democratic | 1918–? |
| Homer Casteel | 1912–1920 1928–1932 | Holmes | Democratic | 1879–1958 |
| Thomas W. Castle | 1870–1874 | Choctaw, Winston | | |
| P. S. Catching | 1848–1852 1858–1862 | Copiah, Simpson | Democratic | 1817/18–? |
| T. J. Catchings | 1856–1859 | Hinds | | |
| Thomas C. Catchings | 1876–1877 | Warren | Democratic | 1847–1927 |
| Paul Cato | 1940–1944 1948–1952 | Claiborne, Jefferson | Democratic | 1890–? |
| Bill Caughman | 1944–1948 | 4th | Democratic | 1905–1977 |
| Chris Caughman | 2016–2024 | Copiah, Rankin, Simpson | Republican | 1967– |
| Samuel Cavit | 1822–1823 | Jefferson | | |
| Newnan Cayce | 1902–1904 | Lowndes | | |
| James R. Chalmers | 1876–1877 | Bolivar, Coahoma | Democratic | 1831–1898 |
| Robert P. Chamberlin | 2000–2005 | DeSoto | Republican | 1965– |
| Zachary T. Champlin | 1918–1920 | 1st | Democratic | 1847–1924 |
| Mike Chaney | 2000–2008 | Issaquena, Warren, Yazoo | Republican | 1944– |
| Lydia Chassaniol | 2007– | Attala, Carroll, Grenada, Leflore, Montgomery, Panola, Tallahatchie, Yalobusha | Republican | 1950– |
| Ray Chatham | 1972–1976 | Forrest, Lamar, Stone | Democratic | 1929–1976 |
| Hollis Cheek | 1992 | Attala, Carroll, Choctaw, Montgomery, Leake, Webster | Democratic | |
| Mitch Childre | 1976–1988 | Rankin | Democratic | 1948– |
| Kathy Chism | 2020– | Benton, Pontotoc, Union | Republican | 1957– |
| Charles Chrisman | 1900–1904 | Lincoln, Lawrence | Democratic | 1858–? |
| J. B. Chrisman | 1859–1865 | Lawrence, Pike | | |
| William R. Chrismond | 1916–1920 | 23rd | Democratic | 1868–1926 |
| Jimmie Christenberry | 1960–1964 | Sharkey, Issaquena | Democratic | 1926–1973 |
| Eugene Clarke | 2004–2020 | Bolivar, Humphreys, Madison, Sharkey, Washington, Yazoo | Republican | 1956– |
| James C. Clarke | 1896 | Attala | Democratic | 1850/51–? |
| Arthur R. Clark | 1932–1936 | 41st | Democratic | 1874–? |
| James Orville Clark | 1948–1956 | Tishomingo, Alcorn, Prentiss | Democratic | 1910–1971 |
| James R. Clark | 1944–1948 | 7th | Democratic | 1900–? |
| John A. Clark | 1916–1920 1932–1936 | Kemper, Winston | Democratic | 1883–1940 |
| Frederick Clarke | 1837 | Clarke | | |
| William L. Clayton | 1928–1932 | 14th | Democratic | 1891–? |
| William H. Clements | 1912–1916 1920–1924 | Sharkey, Issaquena | Democratic | 1873–? |
| David Cleveland | 1830 | Marion, Pike | | |
| James T. Cliett | 1924–1928 | 24th | Democratic | 1894–? |
| James A. Clinton | 1896–1906 | Adams | Democratic | 1864–1907 |
| Kay B. Cobb | 1992–1996 | Calhoun, Lafayette, Yalobusha | Republican | 1942– |
| Joseph B. Cobb | 1854–1857 | Lowndes | Whig | 1819–1858 |
| Hunter K. Cochran | 1940–1944 | 36th | Democratic | 1913–? |
| Stephen Cocke | 1833 1836 | Lowndes, Monroe, Rankin | | |
| James M. Coen | 1916–1920 | 11th | Democratic | 1849–1934 |
| Thomas J. Coffee | 1837–1842 | Rankin, Simpson | | |
| C. S. Coffey | 1892–1896 | Claiborne, Jefferson | | |
| A. A. Cohn | 1920–1924 | 8th | Democratic | |
| Wade Cole | 1956–1960 | Sharkey, Issaquena | Democratic | 1888–? |
| Stanford N. Collier | 1912–1916 | Hinds, Warren | Democratic | 1876–? |
| E. K. Collins | 1960–1972 | Wayne, Jones | Democratic | 1911–? |
| Henry Clay Collins | 1916–1920 | 36th | Democratic | 1883–1950 |
| Nancy Adams Collins | 2011–2016 | Lee, Pontotoc | Republican | 1947– |
| Grady Cook | 1940–1944 | 31st | Democratic | 1894–1956 |
| James V. Cook | 1896–1900 | Quitman, Tunica, Coahoma | Democratic | 1833/34–? |
| Joe Cook | 1932–1940 | Lowndes | Democratic | 1862–1940 |
| H. V. Cooper | 1960–1964 | Warren, Hinds | Democratic | 1890–? |
| Hamilton Cooper | 1827–1830 | Covington, Jones, Wayne | | |
| James M. Cooper | 1936–1940 | Issaquena, Sharkey | Democratic | 1885–? |
| Joseph Cooper | 1829–1830 | Lawrence, Simpson | | |
| Thomas L. Cooper | 1880–1886 1900–1904 | Attala, Leake (1880–1886) Union, Tippah, Marshall, Benton, Tate (1900–1904) | Democratic | 1841–? |
| Forrest Copeland | 1948–1952 | Scott, Newton | Democratic | 1910–? |
| John Corlew | 1973–1980 | Jackson | Democratic | 1943–2023 |
| Claude V. Cornwell | 1952–1956 1960–1964 | Winston, Kemper | Democratic | 1887–? |
| William E. Corr | 1964–1972 | Panola, Yalobusha | Democratic | 1936– |
| William Cothran | 1856 | Carroll | | |
| J. B. Covington | 1858–1861 | Noxubee, Winston | | |
| William T. Covington | 1920–1924 | 34th | Democratic | 1861–? |
| Warren Cowan | 1878–1886 | Warren | | |
| Alfred Cox | 1840 | Coahoma, Washington, Tunica | | |
| Anthony J. Cox | 1916–1920 | 38th | Democratic | 1890–1972 |
| B. L. Crawford | 1948–1952 | Union, Tippah | Democratic | 1873–? |
| Nathan B. Crawford | 1900–1904 | Chickasaw, Calhoun, Pontotoc | Democratic | 1835–? |
| V. E. Crawford | 1932–1936 | 36th | Democratic | 1894–? |
| David E. Crawley | 1916–1920 1940–1944 | Attala | Democratic | 1886–1946 |
| John L. Crigler | 1880–1884 | Clay, Oktibbeha | | |
| Frank A. Critz | 1894–1896 | Clay, Webster | | |
| Robert Crook | 1964–1993 | Bolivar, Sunflower | Democratic | 1929–2011 |
| Wiley J. Croom | 1904–1908 | Hinds, Warren | Democratic | 1865–1915 |
| J. W. Crumpton | 1914 1928–1932 | Tishomingo, Alcorn, Prentiss | Democratic | 1859–? |
| Scottie Cuevas | 1996–2008 | Hancock, Harrison | Democratic | 1965– |
| John Culkin | 1928–1951 | Hinds, Warren | Democratic | 1887–1951 |
| Clarence Cullens | 1874–1875 | Benton, Union, Tippah | | |
| M. C. Cummings | 1861–1862 | Itawamba | | |
| James A. Cunningham | 1908–1912 1914–1916 | Oktibbeha, Choctaw | Democratic | 1874–? |
| M. M. Currie | 1877–1880 | Franklin, Jefferson | | |
| John W. Cutrer | 1888–1892 | Bolivar, Sunflower, Coahoma | Democratic | 1858–? |
| A. W. Dabney | 1846–1850 | Noxubee, Winston | Democratic | 1814/15–? |
| Robert H. Dale | 1932–1936 1944–1948 | Jefferon Davis, Madison, Walthall | Democratic | 1882–? |
| J. H. Dalton | 1880–1884 | Benton, Union, Tippah | | ?–1887 |
| Dee Daniel | 1940–1944 | 36th | Democratic | 1889–? |
| George O. Daniel | 1922–1924 | 23rd | Democratic | 1869–? |
| George L. Darden | 1908–1912 | DeSoto | Democratic | 1879–? |
| Truxton Davidson | 1841 | Wilkinson | | |
| A. P. Davis | 1892–1896 | Kemper, Winston | | |
| Algie Davis | 1976–1984 | Kemper, Lauderdale, Noxubee | Democratic | 1943– |
| David Davis | 1835 | Franklin | | |
| Doug E. Davis | 2005–2012 | DeSoto | Republican | 1977– |
| Elijah McCoy Davis | 1848–1852 | Pike, Amite | Democratic | 1802/03–? |
| Henry L. Davis | 1920–1924 1928–1932 1940–1944 | Lafayette | Democratic | 1868–1948 |
| I. N. Davis | 1856–1859 | Panola, Tallahatchie, Coahoma | | |
| J. L. Davis | 1861–1862 | Calhoun, Yalobusha | | |
| J. P. Davis | 1960–1968 | Calhoun, Webster | Democratic | 1897–? |
| Joseph R. Davis | 1859–1861 | Madison, Scott | | 1825–1896 |
| Vincent Davis | 2008–2009 | Claiborne, Copiah, Hinds, Jefferson | Democratic | 1963– |
| Deborah Jeanne Dawkins | 2000–2020 | Harrison | Democratic | 1951– |
| Joe Daws | 1924–1928 1940–1944 | 15th | Democratic | 1882–? |
| James O. Day | 1928–1932 | 27th | Democratic | 1888–? |
| James P. Dean | 1964–1968 | Alcorn, Prentiss | Democratic | 1933–2008 |
| Robert A. Dean | 1886–1896 1908–1912 | Lafayette | Democratic | 1836–1912 |
| Simon B. Dean | 1928–1932 | 35th | Democratic | 1874–1952 |
| Bob Dearing | 1980–2012 2016–2020 | Adams, Wilkinson | Democratic | 1935–2020 |
| Oliver C. Dease | 1837–1840 | Newton, Smith, Scott, Jasper | | |
| Dennis DeBar | 2016– | George, Greene, Wayne | Republican | 1971– |
| Herman DeCell | 1960–1980 | Holmes, Issaquena, Madison, Sharkey, Yazoo | Democratic | 1924–1986 |
| John Scott Decell | 1924–1928 | Copiah | Democratic | 1850–1931 |
| Scott DeLano | 2020– | Harrison | Republican | 1971– |
| Ed DeMoville | 1952–1956 | Chickasaw, Pontotoc, Calhoun | Democratic | 1905–? |
| George E. Denley | 1928–1932 | 28th | Democratic | 1867–1942 |
| S. J. Denson | 1856–1859 | Madison, Scott | | |
| Albert Tatum Dent | 1902–1908 1924–1928 | Noxubee | Democratic | 1863–? |
| Albert W. Dent | 1900–1904 | Simpson, Covington, Marion, Pearl River | Democratic | 1873–1933 |
| Manford E. Denton | 1932–1936? | 34th | Democratic | 1872–? |
| Cal Dees | 1940–1944 | 1st | Democratic | 1877–? |
| Glen Deweese | 1976–1992 | Lauderdale | Democratic | 1932–2001 |
| Tommy Dickerson | 1993–2003 2008–2012 | George, Greene, Stone, Wayne | Democratic | 1945– |
| David C. Dickson | 1817 1820–1821 | Franklin, Pike, Marion | National Republican | 1792–1836 |
| Thomas Amherst Dickson | 1884–1888 | Copiah, Lawrence, Simpson, Covington | Democratic | 1858–? |
| G. G. Dillard | 1884–1892 | Noxubee | Democratic | 1839–? |
| John R. Dinsmore | 1900 | Noxubee | Democratic | 1855–1900 |
| Jay Disharoon | 1980–1988 | Claiborne, Copiah, Franklin, Jefferson | Democratic | 1949–2014 |
| T. C. Dockery | 1892–1896 | DeSoto | | |
| George S. Dodds | 1886–1892 | Covington, Copiah, Lawrence, Simpson | Democratic | 1854–? |
| Jefferson Davis Donald | 1912–1916 | Wayne, Jones, Perry, Forest, Greene | Democratic | 1861–? |
| John David Doss | 1904–1908 | Kemper, Winston | Democratic | 1861–1927 |
| Sally Doty | 2012– | Copiah, Lawrence, Lincoln, Walthall | Republican | 1966– |
| Tom Douglas | 1960–1972 | Copiah, Claiborne | Democratic | 1912–? |
| A. S. Dowd | 1870–1871 | Bolivar, Coahoma, Tunica | Republican | |
| W. C. Dowd | 1878 | Kemper, Neshoba | | |
| William Dowsing | 1826 | Covington, Monroe, Wayne | | |
| Henry D. Downs | 1819–1820 | Claiborne, Warren | | |
| Ralph H. Doxey | 2004–2008 | Benton, Marshall, Tippah | Democratic | 1950– |
| Joseph Drake | 1864 | Carroll | Democratic | 1806–1878 |
| James Drane | 1852–1865 | Choctaw | | 1808–1869 |
| Thomas E. Drexler | 1932–1936 | 20th | Democratic | 1886–? |
| William H. Duke | 1841 | Chickasaw, Itawamba, Pontotoc | | |
| Lorraine C. Dulaney | 1900–1904 1916–1920 | Sharkey, Issaquena | Democratic | 1863–1945 |
| Robert T. Dunbar | 1881 | Adams | | |
| H. L. Duncan | 1872–1874 | Calhoun, Yalobusha | | |
| W. L. Duncan | 1865 | Tishomingo | | |
| Chris C. Dunn | 1900–1908 1920–1924 | Lauderdale | Democratic | 1871–1934 |
| Collie Dunnam | 1956–1960 | George, Greene, Jackson | Democratic | 1899–? |
| E. A. Durr | 1844–1848 | Kemper, Lauderdale | Democratic | 1806/07–? |
| James Dupree | 1844–1848 | Hinds | Whig | 1791/92–? |
| Brad Dye | 1964–1968 | Grenada, Tallahatchie, Yalobusha | Democratic | 1933–2018 |
| Howard Dyer | 1976–1986 | Sharkey, Washington | Democratic | 1915–1986 |
| Hackett Dyre | 1936–1940 | Carroll, Montgomery | Democratic | 1888–1975 |
| William H. Dyson | 1916–1920 | 36th | Democratic | 1882–1964 |
| William J. East | 1892–1896 1908–1912 1920–1924 1928–1932 | Union, Tippah, Benton, Marshall, Tate | Democratic | 1854–1933 |
| James S. Eaton | 1882–1886 | Covington, Jones, Simpson, Smith, Wayne | | |
| John M. Eddins | 1912–1916 | Union, Tippah, Benton, Marshall, Tate | Democratic | 1874–? |
| William Edwards | 1922–1924 | 3rd | Democratic | 1877–? |
| Pendy Ellard | 1993–1996 | Attala, Leake, Madison | Democratic | |
| Henry T. Ellett | 1854–1865 | Jefferson, Franklin, Claiborne | Democratic | 1812–1887 |
| Ed Ellington | 1976–1984 | Hinds | Democratic | 1940– |
| Armstrong Ellis | 1819–1820 | Jefferson, Franklin | | |
| George W. Ellis | 1896–1898 | Simpson, Covington, Pearl River, Marion | Democratic | 1832/33–? |
| Jesse Ellis | 1867 | Rankin, Smith | | |
| William Annie Ellis | 1912–1916 1920–1924 | Leake, Neshoba | Democratic | 1868–? |
| Frederick W. Elmer Jr. | 1920–1924 | 1st | Democratic | 1882–1948 |
| Henry H. Elmore | 1904–1908 | Holmes | Democratic | 1875–1934 |
| Jeremy England | 2020– | Jackson | Republican | 1982– |
| Charles Francis Engle | 1908–1912 | Adams | Democratic | 1875–? |
| Isaac Enloe | 1858–1861 | Kemper, Neshoba | | |
| R. F. Erwin | 1956–1960 | Choctaw, Oktibbeha | Democratic | 1912–? |
| James C. Eskridge | 1916–1920 | 32nd | Democratic | 1873–1949 |
| Thomas R. Ethridge | 1948–1956 | Lafayette | Democratic | 1918–2010 |
| Charles P. Eubanks | 1924–1928 | 41st | Democratic | 1868–? |
| J. E. Eudy | 1944–1948 1952–1956 | Clay, Webster | Democratic | 1886–1969 |
| Earl Evans Jr. | 1940–1944 1948–1964 | Madison | Democratic | 1906–1976 |
| Houston Evans | 1948 | Harrison, Stone | Democratic | 1895–1948 |
| Walter J. Evans | 1912–1916 1920–1928 | Chickasaw, Calhoun, Pontotoc | Democratic | 1882–? |
| Wesley G. Evans | 1900–1904 | Hancock, Harrison, Jackson | Democratic | 1844–1921 |
| J. E. Everett | 1874–1878 | Yazoo | | |
| R. D. Everitt | 1956–1964 | Sunflower, Humphreys, Washington | Democratic | 1899–? |
| Alex Fairley | 1888–1892 | Copiah, Simpson, Covington | Democratic | 1844–? |
| Thomas P. Falconer | 1835 | Greene, Hancock, Jackson, Jones, Perry, Wayne | | |
| John W. T. Falkner | 1896–1904 | Lafayette | Democratic | 1848–? |
| John B. Farese | 1948–1952 | Benton, Tate | Democratic | 1915–? |
| Orene Farese | 1956–1960 | Union, Tippah, Marshall, Benton, Tate | Democratic | 1916–2010 |
| Leonard Jerome Farley | 1900–1908 | DeSoto | Democratic | 1859–? |
| Hazlewood Power Farish | 1908–1912 | Sharkey, Issaquena | Democratic | 1880–1958 |
| W. S. Farish | 1878 | Sharkey, Issaquena, Washington | | |
| Alexander K. Farrar | 1852–1858 | Adams, Franklin, Wilkinson | | 1814–1878 |
| Preston W. Farrar | 1838–1841 | Wilkinson | Whig | 1805/06–1850 |
| Ronald D. Farris | 1996–2004 | Forrest, Lamar | Republican | 1961– |
| John Davis Fatheree | 1912–1916 1920–1922 | Jasper, Clark | Democratic | 1879–1964 |
| A. G. Ferguson | 1890–1894 | Jones, Greene, George, Perry | | |
| Grey Ferris | 1992–2000 | Issaquena, Warren | Democratic | 1946–2008 |
| John W. Fewell | 1876–1880 | Clarke, Lauderdale | | 1844–1906 |
| C. N. Field | 1956–1960 | Clay, Webster | Democratic | 1908–? |
| Joey Fillingane | 2007– | Covington, Forrest, Jefferson Davis, Lamar, Smith | Republican | 1973– |
| Henry Lloyd Finch | 1944–1948 | 2nd | Democratic | 1883–? |
| Elmer C. Fishel | 1928–1932 | 47th | Democratic | 1883–? |
| W. H. Fitzgerald | 1876–1884 | Grenada, Sunflower, Tallahatchie | | |
| Merle Flowers | 2004–2012 | DeSoto | Republican | 1968– |
| George Messenger Foote | 1928–1932 | 1st | Democratic | 1873–? |
| Huger Lee Foote | 1890–1892 | Issaquena, Sharkey | | 1854–1915 |
| Hezekiah William Foote | 1876–1880 | Kemper, Noxubee, Neshoba | | 1813–1899 |
| Dale Ford | 1972–1980 | Clarke, Jasper, Smith | Democratic | 1925–? |
| David Ford | 1833 | Madison, Yazoo | | |
| Evon A. Ford | 1940–1944 | 5th | Democratic | 1908–1960 |
| Theodore B. Ford | 1888–1892 | Lincoln, Pike, Marion | Democratic | 1848–? |
| Louis Fortenberry | 1980–1988 | Jackson | Democratic | 1935– |
| A. J. Foster | 1965–1972 | Monroe, Clay, Chickasaw, Calhoun | Democratic | 1907–? |
| James Foster | 1825 | Adams | | |
| Arthur Fox | 1841 1846, 1848 | Lowndes, Marion, Lawrence | Democratic | 1788/89–? |
| Andrew F. Fox | 1892 | Webster, Clay | Democratic | 1849–1926 |
| John Fraiser | 1976–1984 | Leflore | Democratic | 1925–? |
| Vic Franckiewicz Jr. | 1989–1993 | Hancock, Harrison, Jackson | Democratic | |
| Charles E. Franklin | 1904–1912 | Chickasaw, Calhoun, Pontotoc | Democratic | 1867–? |
| Lester C. Franklin | 1916–1920 | 34th | Democratic | 1886–1953 |
| M. M. Franklin | 1964–1968 | Lafayette, Pontotoc | Democratic | 1896–? |
| Malcolm A. Franklin | 1904–1916 | Lowndes | Democratic | 1862–? |
| Hillman Terome Frazier | 1993– | Hinds | Democratic | 1950– |
| Thomas Freeland | 1823–1827, 1830 | Claiborne, Warren | | |
| A. J. Freeman | 1892–1896 | Scott, Newton | | |
| Charles H. Frith | 1904–1908 | Amite, Wilkinson | Democratic | 1838–1912 |
| Dave Fullilove | 1948–1952 | Carroll, Montgomery | Democratic | 1873–? |
| C. E. Furlong | 1874–1880 | Warren | | |
| Delma Furniss | 1993–2004 | Coahoma, Quitman, Tunica | Democratic | 1934–2022 |
| John J. Gage | 1884–1888 | Quitman, Grenada, Tallahatchie | Democratic | 1825–? |
| Phillip A. Gandy | 2012–2016 | Greene, George, Stone, Wayne | Republican | |
| Artemus F. Gardner | 1900–1904 | Leflore, Tallahatchie | Democratic | 1860–? |
| Taylor Garland | 1944–1948 | 18th | Democratic | 1895–? |
| Ollie Garmon | 1956–1964 | Coahoma, Quitman, Tunica | Democratic | 1918–? |
| Johnson Garrett | 1932–1936 | 34th | Democratic | |
| T. M. Garrott | 1944–1948 | 34th | Democratic | 1906–? |
| John Gartman | 1870–1871 | Pike, Covington, Lawrence | Republican | |
| Hermes Gautier | 1952–1956 | George, Greene, Jackson | Democratic | 1894–? |
| E. M. Gavin | 1940–1944 | 3rd | Democratic | 1887–? |
| George Washington Gayles | 1880–1888 | Bolivar, Coahoma, Sunflower, Quitman | Republican | 1844–1924 |
| R. E. L. Gentry | 1948–1952 1956–1960 | Covington, Simpson | Democratic | 1915–? |
| Alfred H. George | 1900–1904 | Carroll, Montgomery | Democratic | 1856–? |
| Franklin N. Gerhart | 1928–1932 | 25th | Democratic | 1863–? |
| Washington Dorsey Gibbs | 1878–1882 1908–1912 | Yazoo | Democratic | 1839–1915 |
| W. H. Gibbs | 1870–1874 | Wilkinson | | |
| Charles E. Gibson | 1932–1936 | Lawrence, Lincoln | Democratic | 1888–? |
| Stanley Gilbert | 1878–1882 | Wayne, Jones, Covington, Smith, Simpson | | |
| R. E. Gilder | 1960–1964 | Calhoun, Chickasaw, Pontotoc | Democratic | 1914–? |
| Samuel N. Gilleland | 1840–1844 1850 1856–1857 | Leake, Attala, Neshoba | | |
| Littlebury Gillum | 1848 | Chickasaw, Oktibbeha | | |
| J. P. Gilmer | 1873 | Kemper, Noxubee, Neshoba | | |
| Dewitt M. Ginn | 1928–1932 | 39th | Democratic | 1880–? |
| Herman C. Glazier | 1952–1956 | Sharkey, Issaquena | Democratic | 1918–2004 |
| Robert Gleed | 1870–1876 | Lowndes, Okitbbeha | Republican | 1836–1916 |
| James Alcorn Glover | 1904–1908 | Coahoma, Tunica, Quitman | Democratic | 1866–1915 |
| Mary Lou Godbold | 1957–1960 | Lafayette | Democratic | 1912–2008 |
| Tillman H. Godbold | 1956–1957 | Lafayette | Democratic | ?–1957 |
| George S. Golladay | 1850–1854 | Yalobusha | | |
| Tommy Gollott | 1980–2020 | Harrison | Democratic | 1935– |
| George H. Gordan | 1859–1862 | Adams, Wilkinson | | |
| Adam Gordon | 1833 | Claiborne | | |
| Jack Gordon | 1980–1992 1996–2011 | Chickasaw, others | Democratic | 1944–2011 |
| James Gordon | 1904–1908 | Chickasaw, Calhoun, Pontotoc | Democratic | 1833–1912 |
| W. F. Gore | 1944–1948 | 23rd | Democratic | 1896–? |
| F. B. Graft | 1944–1948 | 20th | Democratic | 1886–? |
| Arthur A. Graham | 1928–1932 | 36th | Democratic | 1865–? |
| T. B. Graham | 1874–1877 | Scott, Newton, Jasper | | |
| Walter A. Graham | 1984–1996 | Pontotoc, Tippah, Union | Democratic | 1936–2011 |
| Seth Granberry | 1836–1844 | Copiah | | |
| J. M. Grantham | 1932–1936 | 26th | Democratic | 1878–? |
| Robert Graves | 1854 | Jones, Greene, Covington, Wayne | | |
| Henry Gray | 1848 | Attala, Leake | Whig | 1816–1892 |
| Truman Gray | 1896–1900 | Wayne, Jones, Perry, Greene | Democratic | 1854–1940 |
| William H. Gray | 1872, 1874 | Issaquena, Washington | Republican | 1841–1919 |
| Spence M. Grayson | 1837–1840 | Yazoo | | |
| Clarence B. Greaves | 1896–1900 1912–1920 | Madison | Democratic | 1863–1940 |
| Harry B. Greaves | 1902–1908 | Madison | Democratic | 1867–1944 |
| Charles B. Green | 1820–1821 | Adams | | |
| Thomas J. Green | 1838–1842 | Warren | | |
| Charles W. Greenwood | 1944–1948 | 15th | Democratic | 1875–1953 |
| Robert S. Greer | 1848–1858 1861–1865 | Marshall | Democratic | 1811/12–? |
| D. Luther Gregory | 1932–1936 | 22nd | Democratic | 1884–? |
| Francis M. Gregory | 1896–1900 | Monroe, Lee, Itawamba | Democratic | 1843/44–? |
| J. M. Gregory | 1928–1932 | 22nd | Democratic | 1858–? |
| John Kenneth Gresham | 1972–1988 | Issaquena, Washington | Democratic | 1930–2009 |
| Luther E. Grice | 1940–1944 | Copiah | Democratic | 1881–1953 |
| Henry C. Griffin | 1876–1877 | Adams | | |
| Jackson T. Griffin | 1861–1862 1878–1882 | Chickasaw Chickasaw, Monroe | | |
| Homer B. Griffing | 1932–1936 | Hancock, Pike | | |
| Leland Grisham | 1960–1964 | Tippah, Union | Democratic | 1914–? |
| Presley Groves | 1888–1892 1904–1908 | Attala, Leake Leake, Neshoba | Democratic | 1841–1915 |
| George Guerieri | 1980–1992 | DeSoto, Tunica | Democratic | 1927–2014 |
| Mike Gunn | 1992–1996 | Hinds, Rankin | Republican | |
| William J. Gunn Jr. | 1952–1956 | Lauderdale | Democratic | 1923–? |
| G. A. Guice | 1888 | Franklin, Jefferson | Democratic | 1852–? |
| John Isaac Guion | 1831–1835 1842–1848 | Washington, Warren Warren, Hinds (1848 only) | Democratic | 1802–1855 |
| H. J. Gully | 1886–1890 | Kemper, Winston | Democratic | 1830–? |
| James Benjamin Gully | 1928–1932 | 15th | Democratic | 1864–? |
| William S. Guy | 1968–1980 | Pike, Walthall | Democratic | 1937–2015 |
| C. H. Guy | 1857 | Calhoun, Yalobusha | | |
| Jasper Felix Guynes | 1913–1916 | Copiah | Democratic | 1875–1961 |
| David T. Guyton | 1884–1888 | Attala, Leake | Democratic | 1838–? |
| T. B. J. Hadley | 1837–1840 | Hinds | | |
| David W. Hadley | 1836–1840 | Madison | | |
| Murray Hailey | 1956–1960 | Kemper, Winston | Democratic | 1928–? |
| Steve Hale | 2012–2016 | Panola, Tate | Democratic | 1954– |
| R. Stephen Hale | 1984–1992 | Jackson | Democratic | 1951– |
| Dick Hall | 1988–2000 | Hinds, Madison | Republican | 1938–2022 |
| Robert S. Hall | 1906–1908 | Wayne, Jones, Perry, Greene | Democratic | 1879–1941 |
| Stanton Hall | 1948–1960 | Forrest, Perry | Democratic | 1901–? |
| James D. Hallam | 1837–1838 | Bolivar, Coahoma, DeSoto, Tunica, Washington | | |
| Glenn Hamilton | 1996–2004 | Choctaw, Montgomery, Webster, Oktibbeha | Republican | 1955– |
| J. G. Hamilton | 1882–1888 1892–1896 | Holmes | Democratic | 1834–? |
| Jones S. Hamilton | 1884–1888 | Hinds | Democratic | 1833–1907 |
| Joe Clay Hamilton | 1992–1996 | Lauderdale | | 1928–2023 |
| Kelly Hammond | 1956–1960 | Marion, Walthall, Jefferson Davis | Democratic | 1901–? |
| William M. Hancock | 1870 | Jasper, Jones, Clarke, Wayne | Republican | 1817/18–1891 |
| Edgar P. Hardee | 1936–1940 | Clarke, Jasper | Democratic | 1888–? |
| H. H. Hardee | 1940–1944 1948–1952 | Wayne, Jones | Democratic | 1910–? |
| Alice Harden | 1988–2012 | Hinds | Democratic | 1948–2012 |
| Ruble H. Hardin | 1936–1940 | Calhoun, Chickasaw, Pontotoc | Democratic | 1897–? |
| J. W. Hardwick | 1944–1948 | 37th | Democratic | 1891–? |
| Bob Hardy | 1972–1976 | Chickasaw, Clay, Lowndes | Democratic | 1919–? |
| Robert S. Hardy | 1928–1936 | 36th | Democratic | 1876–? |
| Thomas S. Hardy | 1870–1874 | Wayne, Jones, Smith, Covington | | |
| William H. Hardy | 1896–1900 | Lauderdale | Democratic | 1837–1917 |
| William B. Harden | 1928–1932 | 31st | Democratic | 1890–? |
| J. W. Hardwick | 1942?–1944 | Prentiss, Alcorn, Tishomingo | | 1890/1–1961 |
| Richard Hargis | 1835 | Covington, Simpson, Lawrence | | |
| J. J. Harker | 1865–1867 | Sunflower | | |
| Josh Harkins | 2012– | Rankin | Republican | 1974– |
| W. R. Harley | 1841 | Marshall | | |
| Horace Harned | 1952–1956 | Oktibbeha, Choctaw | Democratic | 1920–2017 |
| Francis H. Harper | 1908–1912 1932–1940 | Yalobusha, Grenada (1908–1912) Forrest, Perry (1932–1940) | Democratic | 1872–? |
| G. B. Harper | 1932–1936 | Claiborne, Jefferson | Democratic | 1867–? |
| Kenneth M. Harper | 1984–1992 | Warren | Democratic | 1948– |
| Jesse Harper | 1835 | Marion, Pike | | |
| Bill Harpole | 1976–1990 | Clay, Lowndes, Oktibbeha | Democratic | 1912–1990 |
| Elisha Bryan Harrell | 1908–1912 | Madison | Democratic | 1868–? |
| Buckner Harris | 1832–1833 | Jefferson, Copiah | | |
| Clifford Edgar Harris | 1904–1908 | Leflore, Tallahatchie | Democratic | 1875–? |
| Jeptha Vining Harris | 1859–1861 | Lowndes, Oktibbeha | | 1816–1899 |
| Wiley P. Harris | 1825–1830 | Pike, Marion | Democratic | 1818–1891 |
| James E. Harrison | 1848 | Monroe | Democratic | 1815–1875 |
| J. T. Harrison | 1892–1900 | Lowndes | | |
| Richard Harrison | 1858–1861 | Monroe | | |
| Billy Harvey | 1988–2006 | Covington, Forrest, Jefferson Davis, Lamar, Marion | Democratic | 1932–2006 |
| George Harvey | 1884–1888 | Madison | Democratic | 1843/44–? |
| Nevin C. Hathorn | 1920–1924 | 39th | Democratic | 1849–? |
| S. B. Hathorn | 1856–1859 | Covington, Wayne, Jones, Greene | | |
| S. J. Hathorn | 1918 | 39th | Democratic | 1873–1918 |
| Robert E. Hauberg | 1940–1944 | 12th | Democratic | 1910–? |
| J. M. Hawkins | 1865–1867 | Hinds | | |
| Bill Hawks | 1995–2000 | DeSoto | Republican | 1944– |
| J. Walter Heard | 1900–1904 | Clay, Webster | Democratic | 1849–? |
| Marvin B. Henley | 1948–1952 | Leake, Neshoba | Democratic | 1903–1976 |
| John L. Hebron Jr. | 1904–1912 1928–1936 | Washington, Sunflower | Democratic | 1864–1945 |
| Alan Heflin | 1984–1992 | Lauderdale, Newton, Scott | Democratic | 1939–2015 |
| Daniel W. Heidelberg | 1892–1896 1904–1908 | Jasper, Clarke | Democratic | 1858–1941 |
| C. F. Hemingway | 1852–1856 | Carroll | | |
| Lewis S. Hemphill | 1916–1920 | 26th | Democratic | 1853–1924 |
| Elliott Henderson | 1882–1886 | Marion, Perry, Hancock, Harrison, Jackson, Greene | | |
| John Henderson | 1835–1836 | Wilkinson | Whig | 1797–1857 |
| S. G. Henderson | 1874–1875 | Leake | | |
| Charles B. Henley | 1968–1972 | Hinds | Democratic | 1925–1978 |
| Edwards Henry | 1961–1968 | Madison | Democratic | 1919–2015 |
| Patrick Henry | 1904–1908 | Rankin, Smith | Democratic | 1843–1930 |
| Patrick Henry | 1890–1894 | Warren | | |
| Taylor Hill Henry | 1940–1952 | Lowndes | Democratic | 1876–1952 |
| William Herbert | 1823 | Lawrence | | |
| George B. Herring | 1931–1940 | Madison | Democratic | 1900–? |
| Billy Hewes | 1992–2012 | Harrison | Republican | 1961– |
| Stacy Hibler | 1910–1912 | Clay, Webster | Democratic | |
| Billy Hickman | 1972–1980 | Claiborne, Copiah, Lincoln, Simpson | Democratic | 1918–1998 |
| Rod Hickman | 2021– | Kemper, Lauderdale, Noxubee, Winston | Democratic | |
| Allen M. Hicks | 1890–1908 | Yazoo | Democratic | 1835–1915 |
| George Hicks | 1846 | Attala, Neshoba, Leake | Democratic | 1797/98–? |
| George Higgason | 1833 | Monroe, Rankin, Lowndes | | |
| George Robert Hightower | 1904–1908 | Lafayette | Democratic | 1865–1958 |
| Ben Hilbun | 1960–1968 | Noxubee, Oktibbeha | Democratic | 1934– |
| Angela Burks Hill | 2012– | Marion, Pearl River | Republican | 1965– |
| Claude E. Hill | 1918–1920 | 42nd | Democratic | 1885–1947 |
| J. H. Hill | 1890–1892 | Rankin, Smith | | |
| N. C. Hill | 1892–1896 | Wayne, Jones, Perry, Greene | | |
| Thomas B. Hill | 1840–1844 | Panola, Lafayette | | |
| C. A. Hillman | 1948–1952 | Lincoln, Lawrence | Democratic | 1894–? |
| Samuel Hinton | 1900–1904 | Union, Tippah, Marshall, Benton, Tate | Democratic | 1851–? |
| George Austin Hobbs | 1912–1916 | Lincon, Lawrence | Democratic | 1879–? |
| J. V. Hodges | 1848–1852 | Rankin, Smith | Whig | 1816/17–? |
| Howard D. Hollis | 1936–1940 | Benton, Marshall, Tate, Tippah, Union | Democratic | 1886–? |
| G. W. Holloway | 1936–1940 | Jefferson Davis, Marion, Walthall | Democratic | 1870–? |
| J. G. Holloway | 1872–1876 | DeSoto, Tunica | | |
| Henry S. Hooker | 1876–1880 | Holmes | | |
| J. J. Hooker | 1865–1867 | Holmes | | |
| Christian Hoover | 1842 | Pike | | |
| J. W. Hopkins | 1940–1944 | 34th | Democratic | 1904–? |
| M. P. Hopkins | 1932–1936 | Rankin, Smith | Democratic | 1877–? |
| Briggs Hopson | 2008– | Issaquena, Warren, Yazoo | Republican | 1965– |
| John Horhn | 1993– | Hinds, Madison | Democratic | 1955– |
| John H. Horne | 1844–1848 | Clarke, Covington, Jones, Wayne | Democratic | 1795/96–? |
| Ebb Horton | 1968–1976 | Neshoba, Winston | Democratic | 1910–1976 |
| R. N. Hough | 1852–1859 | Clarke, Jasper | | |
| Oscar Houston | 1948–1952 | Coahoma, Tunica, Quitman | Democratic | 1876–1952 |
| R. E. Houston | 1904–1908 | Monroe, Lee, Itawamba | | |
| W. T. Houston | 1886–1890 | Chickasaw, Pontotoc | Democratic | 1849–? |
| J. M. Howry | 1858–1861 | Lafayette | | |
| Billy Hudson | 2008–2020 | Forrest, Perry | Republican | 1938– |
| James W. Hudspeth | 1944–1948 | 36th | Democratic | 1907–1982 |
| Daniel W. Huff | 1916–1920 | 7th | Democratic | 1854–1940 |
| James K. Huff | 1920–1924 | Scott, Newton | Democratic | 1886–? |
| Bunky Huggins | 1984–2008 | Carroll, Grenada, Leflore, Montgomery, Tallahatchie | Republican | 1938–2006 |
| P. O. Hughes | 1840–1844 | Franklin, Jefferson | | |
| Thomas J. Hughes | 1850–1854 | Noxubee, Winston | | |
| William H. Hughes | 1900–1904 | Rankin, Smith | Democratic | 1869–? |
| George Huie | 1859–1865 | Attala, Leake | | |
| Olen C. Hull | 1940–1944 | 13th | Democratic | 1882–? |
| Benjamin G. Humphreys | 1840–1844 | Claiborne | Democratic | 1808–1882 |
| W. W. Humphreys | 1880–1884 | Lowndes | | |
| S. L. Hussey | 1852 | Lauderdale, Newton | | |
| Lawrence C. Hutton | 1924–1928 | 32nd | Democratic | 1885–? |
| Cindy Hyde-Smith | 2000–2012 | Lawrence, Lincoln, Simpson | Democratic (until 2010) Republican (after 2010) | 1959– |
| Wilbur Fisk Hyer | 1882–1886 | Marshall | | 1839–1897 |
| Carroll Ingram | 1972–1980 | Forrest, Lamar, Stone | Democratic | 1942– |
| John L. Irwin | 1827–1830 | Jefferson, Copiah | | |
| Thomas B. Ives | 1838–1846 | Yalobusha | | |
| E. M. Ivy | 1940–1944 | 41st | Democratic | 1894–? |
| Tobe Ivy | 1940–1944 | 8th | Democratic | 1909–? |
| Gary Jackson | 2004–2020 | Choctaw, Montgomery, Oktibbeha, Webster | Republican | 1950– |
| John R. Jackson | 1924–1925? | 12th | Democratic | 1871–1925? |
| Moses Jackson | 1865–1867 1878–1882 | Adams, Wilkinson | Democratic | 1822–1895 |
| Reginald Jackson | 2024– | Coahoma, DeSoto, Quitman, Tate, Tunica | Democratic | |
| Robert E. Jackson | 1912–1916 | Amite, Wilkinson | Democratic | 1882–? |
| Robert L. Jackson | 2004–2024 | Coahoma, Panola, Quitman, Tunica | Democratic | 1955– |
| Sampson Jackson | 1992–2020 | Kemper, Lauderdale, Noxubee, Winston | Democratic | 1953– |
| William Jackson | 1829–1833 | Franklin | | |
| Hampton Jarnagin | 1880–1884 | Noxubee | | 1811/12–1887 |
| Joseph M. Jayne | 1882–1886 1892–1896 | Washington | | |
| H. R. Jeffords | 1882–1886 | Sharkey, Issaquena, Washington | | |
| L. H. Jobe | 1952–1956 | Carroll, Montgomery | Democratic | 1870–? |
| Bill Johnson | 1993–1996 | Hancock, Harrison | Republican | 1954/55– |
| Chris Johnson | 2020– | Forrest, Perry | Republican | |
| David Johnson | 1880–1884 | Itawamba, Lee | | |
| Edward Johnson | 1846–1850 | Choctaw | Democratic | 1809/10–? |
| Francis M. Johnson | 1916–1920 | 1st | Democratic | 1850–1924 |
| Henry H. Johnson | 1932–1936 | 21st | Democratic | 1886–? |
| John Johnson | 1980–1984 | Itawamba, Monroe | Democratic | 1920–2002 |
| Joseph Johnson | 1818 1820 1828–1829 | Wilkinson | | |
| Robert Johnson III | 1993–2004 | Adams, Amite, Pike, Wilkinson | Democratic | 1958– |
| Stephen Johnson | 1870–1874 | Carroll, Leflore | | |
| Timothy L. Johnson | 1996–2004 | Attala, Leake, Madison | Republican | 1959– |
| W. L. Johnson | 1852–1854 | Bolivar | | |
| Amos R. Johnston | 1875–1878 | Hinds, Rankin | Whig | 1812–1879 |
| Means Johnston | 1940–1944 | 27th | Democratic | 1885–? |
| Samuel B. Johnston | 1920–1924 | 25th | Democratic | 1855–? |
| W. L. Johnston | 1852–1854 | Yazoo, Washington, Issaquena | | |
| Carl Johnstone Jr. | 1948–1952 | Chickasaw, Calhoun, Pontotoc | Democratic | 1918–2017 |
| Bill Jolly | 1960–1964 | Lowndes | Democratic | 1913–? |
| Russell Jolly | 2011– | Calhoun, Chickasaw, Lee, Pontotoc, Yalobusha | | |
| Fred Jones | 1944–1952 | Washington, Sunflower, Humphreys | Democratic | 1893–? |
| Gaston L. Jones | 1900–1904 | Union, Tippah, Marshall, Benton, Tate | Democratic | 1860–? |
| Howard Jones | 1940–1944 | 29th | Democratic | 1870–? |
| J. H. Jones | 1890–1892 1894–1896 | Wilkinson | Democratic | 1840–1911 |
| Kenneth Wayne Jones | 2008–2016 | Yazoo, Holmes, Madison, Attala | Democratic | 1966– |
| Reuben C. Jones | 1920–1924 | 15th | Democratic | 1854–? |
| W. M. Jones | 1960–1968 | Franklin, Lincoln | Democratic | 1914–? |
| W. Vol Jones | 1964–1972 | Jones, Wayne | Democratic | 1932–? |
| John Joor | 1821–1825 | Chickasaw, Oktibbeha | | |
| Charles R. Jordan | 1857–1858 | Chickasaw, Oktibbeha | | |
| David Lee Jordan | 1993– | Grenada, Holmes, Humphreys, Leflore, Tallahatchie | Democratic | 1933– |
| Moses Jordan | 1861–1862 1864 | Lowndes, Oktibbeha | | |
| Terry L. Jordan | 1988–2000 | Choctaw, Leake, Neshoba, Winston | Democratic | 1948– |
| William Colbert Keady | 1944–1948 | 29th | Democratic | 1913–1989 |
| Belle Kearney | 1924–1928 | 18th | Democratic | 1863–1939 |
| Walter G. Kearney | 1892–1896 | Madison | | |
| A. M. Keegan | 1831 | Covington, Simpson, Lawrence | | |
| John T. Keeton Jr. | 1984–1993 | Grenada, Montgomery, Tallahatchie | Democratic | 1923–? |
| Garrett Keirn | 1837–1846 | Holmes | | |
| Thomas Keith | 1882–1886 | Newton, Scott, Jasper | | |
| Thomas M. Kemp | 1886–1890 | Marshall | Democratic | 1841–? |
| Carroll Kendrick | 1890–1900 1904–1908 1912–1920 | Tishomingo, Alcorn, Prentiss | Democratic | 1852–1923 |
| Benjamin Kennedy | 1820–1823 | Copiah | | |
| Benjamin Kennedy | 1848–1850 | Carroll | Democratic | 1801/02–1850 |
| John C. Kerr | 1840–1841 | Adams | | |
| James Robert Key | 1900–1904 1908–1910 | Kemper, Winston | Democratic | 1844–1910 |
| William Gwin Kiger | 1892–1904 1920–1932 | Hinds, Warren | Democratic | 1847–1934 |
| Bee King | 1918–1924 | 4th | Democratic | 1866–1949 |
| Benjamin King | 1865–1867 | Simpson, Copiah | | |
| Benjamin King Sr. | 1878–1882 | Copiah, Claiborne | | |
| Tom King | 2000–2012 | Forrest, Lamar, Perry | Republican | 1947– |
| Dean Kirby | 1992– | Rankin | Republican | 1946– |
| Henry J. Kirksey | 1980–1988 | Hinds | Democratic | 1915–? |
| William Kling | 1956–1960 | Claiborne, Jefferson | Democratic | 1917–1974 |
| W. O. Knight | 1956–1964 | Monroe | Democratic | 1905–? |
| Andrew Knox | 1842–1846 | Coahoma, Tunica, Washington, DeSoto, Bolivar | | |
| Rush H. Knox | 1936–1944 | Calhoun, Chickasaw, Pontotoc | Democratic | 1879–? |
| Joseph Koger | 1854–1858 | Noxubee, Winston | | |
| Albert Sidney Kyle | 1912–1916 1920–1924 | Panola | Democratic | 1854–? |
| Claiborne Kyle | 1837–1841 | Marshall | | |
| John C. Kyle | 1882–1886 | Panola | Democratic | 1851–1913 |
| John W. Kyle | 1928–1950 | Panola | Democratic | 1891–1965 |
| S. H. Kyle | 1952–1956 | Coahoma, Quitman, Tunica | Democratic | 1897–? |
| Felix Labauve | 1846–1848 | DeSoto, Washington, Coahoma, Sunflower, Tunica, Bolivar, Issaquena | Democratic | 1809–1879 |
| Charles R. Lacy | 1924–1928 | 37th | Democratic | 1858–? |
| Cornelius J. Ladner | 1948–1952 | Lamar, Pearl River, Hancock | Democratic | 1919–2003 |
| L. C. Ladner | 1956–1960 | Hancock, Pearl River, Lamar | Democratic | 1913–? |
| Philman Ladner | 2024– | Hancock, Harrison | Republican | |
| J. A. Lake Jr. | 1936–1944 | Washington, Humphreys, Sunflower | Democratic | 1905–? |
| William A. Lake | 1848 | Warren | Know Nothing | 1808–1861 |
| J. W. Lamar | 1890, 1894 | Yalobusha, Calhoun | | |
| T. L. Lamb | 1896 | Clay, Webster | Democratic | 1868/69–? |
| David Flavous Lambert | 1956–1964 | Alcorn, Prentiss, Tishomingo | Democratic | 1925–? |
| Rick Lambert | 1980–1993 | Forrest | Democratic | 1952–2012 |
| Bob Lambright | 1936–1940 | Marshall, Tate, Tippah, Union | Democratic | 1899–? |
| John W. Lampkin | 1844–1848 | Panola, Tallahatchie | | |
| Billy Lancaster | 1980–1984 | Carroll, Choctaw, Montgomery, Webster | Democratic | 1933– |
| Edgar M. Lane | 1916–1920 | 5th | Democratic | 1884–1943 |
| S. W. Land | 1865–1867 | Attala, Leake | | |
| Thomas Land | 1831, 1836 | Madison, Yazoo, Holmes | | |
| Troy R. Langston | 1924–1928 | 25th | Democratic | 1855–? |
| K. Palmer Lanneau | 1878 | Adams | | |
| William M. Lansdale | 1846 | Holmes | Whig | 1795/96–? |
| Luther F. Latham | 1928–1932 | 24th | Democratic | 1887–? |
| John C. Lauderdale | 1940–1944 | 35th | Democratic | 1872–1951 |
| W. L. Lawrence | 1878–1882 | Lafayette | | |
| Zacharia Lea | 1820 | Amite | | |
| Robert E. Leachman | 1865 1870–1871 | Lauderdale, Newton | | |
| James Edgar Lee | 1960–1968 | Jefferson Davis, Lamar | Democratic | 1900–1966 |
| John Edwin Lee | 1976–1984 | Newton, Scott | Democratic | 1928–2014 |
| Ezell Lee | 1992–2012 | Harrison, Jackson, Pearl River, Stone | Democratic (until 2011) Republican (after 2011) | 1938–2012 |
| Paul Lee | 1964–1968 | Leake, Newton, Scott | Democratic | 1910–? |
| Perry Lee | 2004–2016 | Copiah, Covington, Rankin, Simpson | Republican | 1952– |
| Robert C. Lee | 1900–1904 | Madison | Democratic | 1861–? |
| Stephen D. Lee | 1878 | Lowndes | | 1833–1908 |
| Greenwood LeFlore | 1840–1844 | Carroll, Tallahatchie | Whig | 1800–1865 |
| Frank Leftwich | 1964–1968 | Monroe | Democratic | 1903–? |
| George Jabez Leftwich | 1908–1912 | Monroe, Lee, Itawamba | Democratic | 1859–? |
| Herbert T. Leonard | 1924–1928 | 22nd | Democratic | 1886–? |
| A. Lewenthall | 1896–1900 | Madison, Sunflower | Democratic | 1862/63–? |
| James M. Liddell | 1882–1886 | Carroll, Montgomery, Leflore | | |
| Dabney Lipscomb | 1846–1850 | Lowndes | Democratic | 1803–1850 |
| Finis H. Little | 1870–1876 | Chickasaw, Monroe | Republican | ?–1880 |
| Travis Little | 1992–2008 | Alcorn, Tippah, Tishomingo | Republican | 1942– |
| Talmadge D. Littlejohn | 1964–1968 | Tippah, Union | Democratic | 1935–2015 |
| Bob Logan | 1972–1976 | Newton, Scott | Democratic | 1918–2011 |
| James Stevens Logan | 1908–1912 | Jefferson, Claiborne | Democratic | 1867–? |
| Andrew H. Longino | 1880–1884 | Lawrence, Pike, Lincoln | Democratic | 1854–1942 |
| Will Longwitz | 2012–2016 | Hinds, Madison | Republican | 1972– |
| James O. Looney | 1900–1904 | Tishomingo, Alcorn, Prentiss | Democratic | 1855–? |
| Floyd Loper | 1928–1932 | 13th | Democratic | 1870–? |
| Peter Loper | 1864 | Jasper, Clarke, Wayne | | |
| W. L. Lorance | 1878–1882 | Pontotoc | | |
| Brad Lott | 1993–1996 | Jackson | Republican | |
| Quitman Lott | 1952–1956 1960–1964 | Lamar, Hancock, Pearl River | Democratic | 1906–1963 |
| Frederick H. Lotterhos | 1920 | 6th | Democratic | 1870–? |
| Franklin Love | 1833 1838–1842 1856–1858 | Pike, Marion | | |
| John Love | 1956–1968 | Attala, Choctaw, Winston | Democratic | 1907–? |
| Mark Perrin Lowrey Love | 1920–1928 | 42nd | Democratic | 1881–1953 |
| R. T. Love | 1892–1896 | Oktibbeha, Choctaw | | |
| William A. Love | 1912–1916 | Lowndes | Democratic | 1848–? |
| William F. Love | 1890–1896 | Wilkinson | Democratic | 1850–1898 |
| B. H. Loving | 1940–1944 1948–1952 | Clay, Webster | Democratic | 1897–? |
| E. L. Lowe | 1944–1948 | 31st | Democratic | 1906–? |
| J. Roland Lowe | 1956–1960 1964–1968 | Panola | Democratic | 1914–? |
| Joseph T. Lowrey | 1920–1924 | 7th | Democratic | 1878–? |
| Robert Lowry | 1865–1866 | Rankin, Smith | Democratic | 1829–1910 |
| William Brooks Lucas | 1944–1964 | Noxubee | Democratic | 1891–1970 |
| O. A. Luckett | 1861–1862 1864 | Madison, Scott | | |
| John Lumpkin | 1932–1936 | 40th | Democratic | 1892–1972 |
| John W. Lumpikin | 1846 | Panola, Tallahatchie | Democratic | 1813/14–? |
| Oliver C. Luper | 1924–1928 | 39th | Democratic | 1882–? |
| William H. Luse | 1882–1890 | Yazoo | Democratic | 1837–? |
| Matthew Lyle | 1865–1867 | Madison, Scott | | |
| W. D. Lyles | 1865–1867 | Noxubee, Winston | | |
| W. L. Lyles | 1871–1874 | Pontotoc, Lafayette | | |
| Charles Lynch | 1827–1828 1833 | Covington, Simpson, Lawrence | Democratic Whig | 1783–1853 |
| Malcolm Mabry | 1980–1988 | Coahoma, Tunica | Republican | 1933–2020 |
| William C. Mabry | 1932–1936 | 13th | Democratic | 1878–? |
| Leslie E. Mabus | 1932–1936 | 23rd | Democratic | 1896–? |
| Eugene Magee | 1835–1836 | Washington, Warren | | |
| G. Wood Magee | 1904–1908 | Lincoln, Lawrence | Democratic | 1870–1941 |
| Thomas A. Magee | 1880–1884 | Jefferson, Franklin | | |
| R. W. Magruder | 1898–1900 | Claiborne, Jefferson | | |
| William W. Magruder | 1904–1908 | Oktibbeha, Choctaw | Democratic | 1867–? |
| Hugh Kirby Mahon | 1908–1912 | Tippah, Benton, Marshall, Union, Tate | Democratic | 1870–? |
| William E. Mallett | 1924–1928 | Hinds | Democratic | 1866–? |
| J. Con Maloney | 1972–1988 | Hinds | Republican | 1939– |
| V. C. Manning | 1984–1988 | Choctaw, Neshoba, Winston | Democratic | 1947– |
| Arthur L. Marshall | 1924–1928 | 29th | Democratic | 1862–? |
| C. A. Marshall | 1888–1890 | DeSoto | Democratic | 1833–? |
| Carl Marshall | 1924–1928 | Lamar, Hancock, Pearl River | Democratic | 1884–? |
| James A. Marshall | 1837–1838 1840–1844 | Kemper, Lauderdale | | |
| Martin Marshall | 1884 | Warren | | |
| Bill Martin | 1954–1960 | Yazoo | Democratic | 1916–? |
| Burkett H. Martin | 1952–1956 | Hinds, Warren | Democratic | 1910–? |
| George Dan Martin | 1968–1972 | Madison, Rankin, Scott | Democratic | 1936– |
| J. M. Martin | 1882–1886 | Copiah | | |
| T. N. Martin | 1865–1867 | Chickasaw | | |
| William B. Martin | 1900–1904 | Washington, Sunflower | Democratic | 1857–? |
| William T. Martin | 1888–1894 | Adams | Democratic | 1823–1910 |
| Alton Massey | 1936–1940 | Attala | Democratic | 1909–? |
| Chris Massey | 2012– | DeSoto | Republican | 1971– |
| W. T. Mason | 1858–1861 | Marshall | | |
| James M. Matlock | 1841 | Bolivar, Coahoma, DeSoto, Tunica, Washington | | |
| Joseph W. Matthews | 1844–1848 | Marshall | Democratic | 1812–1862 |
| Samuel Matthews | 1837–1842 | Tippah, Tishomingo | | |
| Willis T. Matthews | 1952–1956 | Simpson, Covington | Democratic | 1921–? |
| James H. Maury | 1837–1840 | Claiborne | | |
| Joe Maxcy | 1972–1976 | Itawamba, Monroe, Prentiss, Tishomingo | Democratic | 1939– |
| Bill May | 1980–1984 | Itawamba, Prentiss, Tishomingo | Democratic | 1951– |
| Robert Burns Mayes | 1892–1894 | Copiah | Democratic | 1867–1921 |
| Hamilton Mayson | 1864 | Marion, Covington, Jones | | |
| Joseph McAfee | 1848–1854 | Covington, Greene, Jones, Wayne | Democratic | 1814/15–? |
| Morgan McAfee | 1852 | Holmes, Sunflower | | |
| Bee McAlpin | 1948–1952 | Rankin, Smith | Democratic | 1904–? |
| Deaton McAuley | 1944–1952 | Marshall | Democratic | 1908–? |
| H. C. McCabe | 1877 | Scott, Jasper, Newton | | |
| Torrey G. McCallum | 1920–1924 | Jones, Wayne | Democratic | 1873–? |
| W. H. McCargo | 1865–1867 | DeSoto, Tunica | | |
| J. L. McCaskill | 1876–1880 | Hinds, Rankin | | |
| John J. McCaughn | 1856–1859 | Hancock, Harrison, Jackson, Perry | | c. 1800-1861 |
| Tyler McCaughn | 2020– | Lauderdale, Newton, Scott | Republican | 1982– |
| S. J. McCauley | 1936–1940 1944–1948 | Hinds, Warren | Democratic | 1883–? |
| L. S. McClaren | 1960–1964 | Pike, Franklin | Democratic | 1903–? |
| H. B. McClure | 1872–1877 | Franklin, Jefferson | | |
| James McClure Jr. | 1952–1956 | Panola | Democratic | 1924–2016 |
| C. W. McCord | 1858–1861 | Tishomingo | | |
| T. G. McCormick | 1960–1968 | Leake, Newton, Scott | Democratic | 1899–? |
| Charley McCoy | 1972–1976 | Itawamba, Monroe, Prentiss, Tishomingo | Democratic | 1916–? |
| Chris McDaniel | 2008–2024 | Forrest, Jones | Republican | 1971– |
| William A. McDonald | 1888–1892 | Benton, Tippah, Union | Democratic | 1857–? |
| Will Tate McDonald | 1896–1900 1908–1912 | Hancock, Harrison, Jackson | Democratic | 1862–? |
| Howard A. McDonnell | 1944–1948 1952–1956 1964–1968 | Harrison | Democratic | 1909–? |
| James R. McDowell | 1908–1912 | Hinds, Warren | Democratic | 1878–? |
| James McDugald | 1848–1850 | Clarke, Jasper | Democratic | 1807/08–? |
| Daniel R. McGehee | 1924–1928 1932–1936 | Pike, Franklin | Democratic | 1883–? |
| Harvey McGehee | 1916–1920 | 8th | Democratic | 1887–1965 |
| John Hiram McGehee | 1892–1896 1900–1904 | Pike, Franklin | Democratic | 1854–? |
| Mayes McGehee | 1956–1960 | Pike, Franklin | Democratic | 1924–2014 |
| Micajah Cicero McGehee | 1908–1912 | Pike, Franklin | Democratic | 1866–? |
| William McGraw | 1944–1956 | Yazoo | Democratic | 1889–? |
| George A. McIlhenny | 1896–1900 | Scott, Newton | Democratic | 1859/60–? |
| Oliver McIlhenny Jr. | 1906–1908 | Scott, Newton | Democratic | 1861–1928 |
| Willard McIlwain | 1968–1976 | Humphreys, Washington | Democratic | 1915–? |
| Frank S. McInnis | 1928–1932 | 41st | Democratic | 1888–? |
| D. A. McIntosh | 1898–1900 | Simpson, Covington, Marion, Pearl River | | |
| Tarver McIntosh | 1932–1936 | Covington, Simpson | Democratic | 1902–? |
| William E. McIntyre | 1944–1948 | 5th | Democratic | 1885–1980 |
| W. E. McIntyre Jr. | 1952–1956 | Rankin, Smith | Democratic | 1923–? |
| Edwin V. McKay | 1936–1940 | George, Greene, Jackson | Democratic | 1883–? |
| Laughlin McKay | 1823–1826 | Greene, Hancock, Jackson, Perry | | |
| A. F. McKeighney | 1936–1940 | Clay, Webster | Democratic | 1876–? |
| Larken T. McKenzie | 1924–1928 | 36th | Democratic | 1872–? |
| Bill McKinley | 1968–1972 | Hinds | Democratic | 1931–? |
| M. F. McKinney | 1890 | Marshall | | |
| Meek J. McKinney | 1896 | Union, Tippah, Benton, Tate, Marshall | Democratic | 1837/38–? |
| Robert McLain | 1859–1865 | Clarke, Wayne, Jasper | | |
| John McLaurin | 1960–1964 | Rankin, Smith | Democratic | 1926–2004 |
| H. J. McLaurin | 1896–1900 1904–1908 | Sharkey, Issaquena | Democratic | 1853–1909 |
| William K. McLaurin | 1904–1916 | Hinds, Warren | Democratic | 1857–1915 |
| George Alonzo McLean | 1904–1908 | Carroll, Montgomery | Democratic | 1859–? |
| Michael McLendon | 2020– | DeSoto | Republican | 1963– |
| George McLeod | 1971–1980 | George, Greene, Perry, Wayne | Democratic | 1927–? |
| John McLeod | 1826–1833 | Perry, Jones, Wayne, Hancock, Jackson, Greene | | |
| J. N. McLeod | 1888–1892 | Quitman, Grenada, Tallahatchie | Democratic | 1836–? |
| Chad McMahan | 2016– | Itawamba, Lee | Republican | 1972– |
| J. M. McMartin | 1882–1886 | Claiborne | | |
| Burton R. McMillan | 1940–1948 | Leake | Democratic | 1907–2003 |
| Lee McMillan | 1908–1912 | Carroll, Montgomery | Democratic | 1847–1932 |
| James Y. McNabb | 1836–1837 | Pike, Marion | | |
| J. A. McNeil | 1874–1878 | Pontotoc, Lafayette | | |
| Myron S. McNeil | 1904–1908 | Copiah | Democratic | 1873–1944 |
| Alexander McNutt | 1835, 1837 | Warren | Democratic | 1802–1848 |
| J. B. McRae | 1859–1865 | Hancock, Harrison, Jackson | | |
| Archie W. McRaney | 1928–1932 | 4th | Democratic | 1884–1962 |
| William McWillie | 1854 | Scott, Madison | Democratic | 1795–1869 |
| Cowles Mead | 1821 | Franklin | Democratic-Republican | 1776–1844 |
| Samuel M. Meek | 1900 | Lowndes | Democratic | 1835–? |
| T. L. Mendenhall | 1874–1878 | Covington, Simpson, Smith, Jones, Wayne | | |
| James Metcalfe | 1842–1848 | Adams | Whig | 1789/90–? |
| Nolan Mettetal | 1996–2012 | Panola, Tate | Republican | 1945–2020 |
| M. A. Metts | 1875–1878 | Choctaw, Winston, Webster | | |
| J. Walter Michel | 1999–2011 2016– | Hinds, Madison | Republican | 1960– |
| Ellwood K. Middleton | 1918–1924 | 12th | Democratic | 1866–? |
| Orange S. Miles | 1870–1871 | Jefferson, Franklin | | |
| William R. Miles | 1846–1848 | Madison, Yazoo | Whig | |
| C. G. Miller | 1856–1859 | Newton?, Lauderdale | | |
| C. Hooker Miller | 1928–1932 | 11th | Democratic | 1888–1966 |
| Charles F. Miller | 1865–1867 | Lowndes, Oktibbeha | | |
| John H. Miller | 1842–1844 | Itawamba, Pontotoc | | |
| Hainon A. Miller | 1987–1996 | Humphreys, Sunflower, Washington, Sharkey, Yazoo | Democratic | 1930–1998 |
| Irvin Miller | 1896–1900 | Leake, Neshoba | Democratic | 1836/37–? |
| Scheller A. Miller | 1916–1920 | 24th | Democratic | 1885–1925 |
| Upton Miller | 1840–1844 | Hinds | | |
| Cecil Mills | 1980–1993 | George, Greene, Jackson, Wayne | Democratic | 1934– |
| Green Millsaps | 1870–1874 | Copiah, Claiborne | Republican | 1812–1885 |
| Livingston Mims | 1859–1863 | Hinds | Democratic | 1833–1906 |
| Sam Mims Jr. | 1916–1920 | 36th | Democratic | 1880–1946 |
| Bill Minor | 1980–1988 1992–2004 | Benton, Marshall, DeSoto | Democratic | 1942– |
| Henry A. Minor | 1920–1924 1928–1936 | Noxubee | Democratic | 1872–? |
| Charles B. Mitchell | 1882–1886 1896–1899 | Pontotoc | Democratic | 1842–1899 |
| Billy Mitts | 1960–1964 | Clarke, Jasper | Democratic | 1919–1973 |
| William B. Mixon | 1896–1900 1920–1924 | Pike, Franklin | Democratic | 1866–? |
| Thomas O. Moffatt | 1996–2012 | Jackson | Republican | 1935–2020 |
| Ollie Mohamed | 1964–1972 1980–1993 | Humphreys, Madison, Yazoo | Democratic | 1925–2008 |
| James Molpus | 1968–1980 | Coahoma | Democratic | 1928–1982 |
| Noel Monaghan | 1940–1944 1964 | Lee | Democratic | 1890–1964 |
| James J. Monroe | 1854 | Lauderdale, Newton | | |
| A. A. Montgomery | 1888–1892 | Clay, Choctaw, Oktibbeha, Webster | | |
| Bob Montgomery | 1980–1993 | Holmes, Madison, Yazoo | Democratic | 1939– |
| F. E. Montgomery | 1944–1948 | Lincoln, Lawrence | Democratic | 1887–1944 |
| Haskins Montgomery | 2008–2016 | Jasper, Jones, Scott, Smith | Democratic | 1952– |
| Hugh Montgomery | 1837–1839 | Franklin, Jefferson | | |
| P. R. Montgomery | 1865–1867 | Claiborne, Jefferson, Franklin | | |
| Ray Montgomery | 1972–1980 | Holmes, Issaquena, Madison, Sharkey, Yazoo | Republican | 1935–2014 |
| Robert Montgomery | 1842–1846 | Madison, Yazoo | | |
| Sonny Montgomery | 1957–1967 | Lauderdale | Democratic | 1920–2006 |
| W. A. Montgomery | 1878–1882 | Hinds, Franklin | | |
| Robert A. Monty | 1988–1993 | Issaquena, Warren, Washington | Democratic | 1944–2015 |
| Alfred T. Moore | 1837 | Wilkinson | | |
| Dan Moore | 1976–1980 | Itawamba, Monroe, Prentiss, Tishomingo | Democratic | 1936– |
| Edward Harris Moore | 1894–1908 | Bolivar | Democratic | 1852–1908 |
| G. D. Moore | 1861–1864 | Noxubee, Winston | | |
| H. D. Moore | 1896–1900 | Kemper, Winston | Democratic | 1861/62–? |
| James Moore | 1904–1908 | Yalobusha, Grenada | Democratic | 1839–? |
| James Moore | 1944–1948 | 28th | Democratic | 1891–? |
| John Paul Moore | 1968–1976 | Noxubee, Oktibbeha | Democratic | 1930–2011 |
| Walter Moore | 1960–1968 | Grenada, Tallahatchie, Yalobusha | Democratic | 1927–1976 |
| Philip Moran | 2012– | Hancock, Harrison | Republican | 1961– |
| Albert T. Morgan | 1870–1873 | Yazoo | Republican | 1842–1922 |
| Clarence E. Morgan | 1920–1924 | 22nd | Democratic | 1885–? |
| Jacob B. Morgan | 1833 | Hinds | | |
| James B. Morgan | 1876–1880 | DeSoto, Tate, Tunica | Democratic | 1833–1892 |
| J. Ed Morgan | 2004–2008 | Forrest, Lamar, Pearl River, Perry, Stone | Republican | 1947– |
| Johnny Morgan | 1984–1992 | Calhoun, Lafayette, Yalobusha | Democratic | 1947–2023 |
| N. L. Morgan | 1857 | Choctaw | | |
| Jordan L. Morris | 1886–1890 | Greene, Wayne, Jones, Perry | Democratic | 1833–? |
| Stanford Morse | 1956–1964 | Harrison, Stone | Democratic Republican | 1926–2002 |
| C Brinkley Morton | 1952–1956 | Union, Tippah, Tate, Benton, Marshall | Democratic | 1926–1994 |
| Joseph M. Mosby | 1968–1972 | Clarke, Kemper, Lauderdale, Newton | Democratic | 1917–? |
| H. Moseley | 1865–1867 | Coahoma, Panola, Tallahatchie | | |
| Thomas H. Mosley | 1924–1928 | 23rd | Democratic | 1888–? |
| Hushel Moss | 1956–1960 | Smith, Rankin | Democratic | 1926–2013 |
| Henry Mounger | 1904–1908 | Simpson, Covington, Marion, Pearl River | Democratic | 1872–1928 |
| Milton Uriah Mounger | 1912–1916 | Simpson, Covington, Pearl River, Marion, Lamar | Democratic | 1867–? |
| Jean D. Muirhead | 1968–1972 | Hinds | Democratic | 1929–2011 |
| Joe H. Mulholland | 1964–1968 1976–1984 | Neshoba, Noxubee, Winston | Democratic | 1934–2014 |
| Tommy Munro | 1968–1972 | Harrison | Democratic | 1931–? |
| Harry K. Murray | 1916–1924 | 12th | Democratic | 1886–1950 |
| Ronnie Musgrove | 1988–1996 | Panola, Tate | Democratic | 1956– |
| Albert Myers Jr. | 1912–1916 | DeSoto | Democratic | 1873–? |
| A. Mygatt | 1870–1874 | Warren, Issaquena | | |
| P. H. Napier | 1865–1867 | Clarke, Wayne, Jasper | | |
| John H. Neal | 1924–1932 | 31st | Democratic | 1862–? |
| O. Y. Neely | 1861–1862 | Kemper, Neshoba | | |
| James C. Neilson | 1888–1892 | Lowndes | Democratic | 1838–? |
| J. M. Nelson | 1852–1856 | Pike | | |
| William T. Nesbit | 1896–1900 | DeSoto | Democratic | 1833/34–? |
| Buddie Newman | 1948–1952 | Sharkey, Issaquena | Democratic | 1921–2002 |
| Raymond L. Nichols | 1920–1924 | Madison | Democratic | 1884–? |
| George Nicholson | 1846 | Pike | Democratic | 1809/10–? |
| Isaac R. Nicholson | 1820–1822 | Greene, Jackson, Hancock, Perry | Democratic | 1789/90–1844 |
| G. F. Niel | 1858–1865 | Carroll | | |
| Charles Nix | 1972–1988 | Panola, Quitman | Democratic | 1931–? |
| George R. Nobles | 1932–1936 | Hinds | Democratic | 1878–? |
| Jim Noblin | 1972–1980 | Hinds | Democratic | 1937– |
| Edmond Noel | 1896–1904 1920–1927 | Holmes | Democratic | 1856–1927 |
| Thomas Vaughan Noland | 1882–1886 | Wilkinson | | 1835–1909 |
| J. R. Nolen | 1890–1894 | Clay, Webster, Oktibbeha | | |
| Claude Norman | 1956–1960 | Newton, Scott | Democratic | 1895–? |
| Linton G. North | 1928–1932 | 29th | Democratic | 1893–? |
| Charles M. Norton | 1822 | Adams | | |
| Joseph Elias Norwood | 1912–1916 | Pike, Franklin | Democratic | 1873–? |
| Sollie Norwood | 2013– | Hinds | Democratic | 1952– |
| Alan Nunnelee | 1995–2012 | Lee, Pontotoc | Republican | 1958– |
| S. T. Oldham | 1876–1880 | Attala, Leake | | |
| Simeon Oliver | 1854–1865 | DeSoto, Tunica | | |
| Edgar Overstreet | 1976–1984 | Calhoun, Lafayette, Yalobusha | Democratic | 1926–? |
| R. W. Owen | 1884–1888 | Tate, Tunica | Democratic | 1844–? |
| Samuel J. Owen | 1908–1912 1924–1928 | Tippah, Benton, Marshall, Union, Tate | Democratic | 1867–? |
| Sterling W. Owen | 1924 | 34th | Democratic | 1875–1924 |
| George Owens | 1952–1960 | Pontotoc, Chickasaw, Calhoun | Democratic | 1901–? |
| Jack Pace | 1960–1964 1968–1972 | Simpson, Jeff Davis, Lawrence | Democratic | 1917–2006 |
| Albert G. Packer | 1870–1876 | Holmes | | |
| Samuel E. Packwood | 1884–1888 | Pike, Lincoln, Marion | Democratic | |
| Henry M. Paine | 1872–1874 | Marshall | | |
| Merle F. Palmer | 1964–1970 | Jackson | Democratic | 1919–1990 |
| James Madison Pannell | 1920–1924 | 11th | Democratic | 1883–1930 |
| David Parker | 2013– | DeSoto | Republican | 1969– |
| W. H. Parker | 1875–1875 | Carroll, Leflore | | |
| J. L. Parkes | 1928–1932 | 13th | Democratic | |
| James Thompson Parks | 1904–1905 | Wayne, Jones, Perry, Greene | Democratic | 1878–1905 |
| Rita Potts Parks | 2012– | Alcorn, Tippah | Republican | 1962– |
| Walter B. Parks | 1916–1920 | 30th | Democratic | 1868–1930 |
| Corbet Lee Patridge | 1964–1976 | Leflore | Democratic | 1923–? |
| W. S. Patton | 1864 | Lauderdale, Newton | | |
| W. D. Peery | 1878–1882 | Carroll, Leflore, Montgomery | | |
| William G. Pegram | 1861–1862 | Tippah | | |
| A. H. Pegues | 1842–1850 1856–1858 | Lafayette | Democratic | 1808/09–? |
| Harvey T. Pennington | 1936–1940 1952–1956 | Tallahatchie, Leflore | Democratic | 1906–1962 |
| Roy C. Perdue | 1968–1972 | Rankin, Madison, Scott | Democratic | 1925–? |
| James B. Perkins | 1880–1882 | DeSoto, Tate, Tunica | | |
| John Perkins | 1920 | 23rd | Democratic | 1886–? |
| William M. Perrigin | 1948–1952 | Oktibbeha, Choctaw | Democratic | 1912–? |
| B. G. Perry | 1964–1976 | DeSoto, Lafayette, Marshall | Democratic | 1931–2016 |
| Doyle Perry | 1964–1968 | Attala, Choctaw, Winston | Democratic | 1906–? |
| John J. Pettus | 1848–1858 | Kemper, Neshoba | Democratic | 1813–1867 |
| James Phelan Sr. | 1861–1862 | Monroe | Democratic | 1821–1873 |
| Henry Phillips | 1840–1841 | Madison | | |
| Charles W. Pickering | 1972–1980 | Jones | Republican | 1937– |
| Stacey Pickering | 2004–2008 | Jones | Republican | 1968– |
| James H. Pierce | 1870–1874 | Panola, Tallahatchie | | |
| Edwin L. Pittman | 1964–1972 | Forrest, Lamar, Marion | Democratic | 1935– |
| Frank B. Pittman | 1936–1940 | Pearl River, Lamar, Hancock | Democratic | 1893–? |
| Charles Pittman | 1980–1984 | Grenada, Tallahatchie, Yalobusha | Democratic | 1948– |
| Hudie Pitts | 1960–1968 | George, Greene, Perry, Stone | Democratic | 1905–? |
| John Q. Poindexter | 1916–1920 | 16th | Democratic | 1954–1932 |
| W. Q. Poindexter | 1861–1862, 1864 | | | |
| John A. Polk | 2012– | Lamar, Pearl River | Republican | 1949– |
| Robert V. Pollard | 1908–1912 | Leflore, Tallahatchie | Democratic | 1871–? |
| Frederick Pope | 1838–1839 | Clark, Covington, Jones, Wayne | | |
| George Pope | 1852–1856 | Attala, Leake | | |
| L. B. Porter | 1944–1948 1952–1956 | Scott, Newton | Democratic | 1913–? |
| Louis L. Posey | 1924–1928 | 10th | Democratic | 1878–? |
| Lynn Posey | 1988–2008 | Claiborne, Copiah, Hinds, Jefferson | Democratic | 1955– |
| Samuel Postelthwaite | 1819 | Adams | | |
| Clayton D. Potter | 1908–1916 | Hinds, Warren | Democratic | 1880–1924 |
| Amy Tuck Powell | 1991–1996 | Lowndes, Oktibbeha, Webster | Democratic | 1963– |
| Eric Powell | 2008–2012 | Alcorn, Tippah, Tishomingo | Democratic | 1966– |
| John William Powell | 1960–1988 | Amite, Pike, Wilkinson | Democratic | 1928–2010 |
| Samuel.Powell | 1884–1888 | DeSoto | Democratic | 1824–? |
| F. B. Pratt | 1876 1880 | Madison | | |
| Alexander Price | 1896–1900 | Rankin, Smith | Democratic | 1841/42–? |
| Duel H. Price | 1948–1952 | Jefferson Davis, Marion, Walthall | Democratic | 1898–? |
| Nathaniel S. Price | 1846–1850 | Tippah | Democratic | 1813/14–? |
| Ray W. Price | 1952–1956 | Lincoln, Lawrence | Democratic | 1910–? |
| Walter Price | 1896–1900 1908–1916 | Noxubee | Democratic | 1854–? |
| William Price | 1872–1876 | Grenada, Sunflower, Tallahatchie | | |
| Richard Pridgen | 1956–1960 | Lincoln, Lawrence | Democratic | 1913–? |
| J. R. Prince | 1894–1896 | Noxubee | | |
| Neal Prisock | 1936–1940 | Winston, Kemper | Democratic | |
| Thomas H. Prosser | 1833 | Wilkinson | | |
| James Purvis | 1892–1896 | Rankin, Smith | | |
| Perrin H. Purvis | 1964–1988 | Lee | Democratic | 1918–2004 |
| James B. Quinn | 1843–1846 | Pike | | |
| J. M. Quinn | 1859–1865 | Rankin, Smith | | |
| P. C. Quinn | 1864 | Lawrence, Pike | | |
| John A. Quitman | 1835–1836 | Adams | Whig | 1798–1858 |
| Samuel Ragsdale | 1838–1842 | Monroe | | |
| Lemuel F. Rainwater | 1896–1900 1924–1928 | Panola | Democratic | 1848–? |
| Charles H. Ramsay | 1924–1928 | 4th | Democratic | 1858–? |
| A. W. Ramsey | 1842–1848 | Hancock, Greene, Harrison, Jackson, Perry | Democratic | 1806/07–? |
| W. J. Rankin | 1859–1865 | Greene, Jones, Covington, Perry, Marion | | |
| Clement L. V. Ratcliff | 1904–1908 | Pike, Franklin | Democratic | 1871–1960 |
| William Ratliff | 1880–1884 | Hinds, Rankin | | |
| William Lee Rayborn | 1980–2000 | Lawrence, Lincoln, Pike | Democratic | 1936–2019 |
| John Rayburn | 1837–1840 | Panola, Lafayette | | |
| K. G. Rayburn | 1944–1948 | 31st | Democratic | 1908–? |
| George Ready | 1992–1994 | DeSoto | Democratic | 1957– |
| Richard F. Reed | 1912–1914 | Adams | Democratic | 1861–1926 |
| R. B. Reeves | 1964–1976 | Pike, Walthall | Democratic | 1928–2008 |
| Ralph Regan | 1822 | Warren, Claiborne | | |
| Bill Renick | 1988–1992 | Benton, Marshall, Tippah | Democratic | 1954– |
| James A. Rester | 1964–1968 | Hancock, Pearl River | Democratic | 1929–? |
| Hiram Rhodes Revels | 1870 | Adams | Republican | 1827–1901 |
| A. E. Reynolds | 1850–1858 | Tishomingo | | |
| B. F. Reynolds | 1856–1859 | Rankin, Smith | | |
| R. O. Reynolds | 1876–1887 | Monroe, others | Democratic | 1832–1887 |
| Brian Rhodes | 2024– | Rankin, Smith | Republican | |
| William Charles Rhodes | 1972–1984 | Jackson | Democratic | 1931–2015 |
| J. W. Rice | 1856 | Chickasaw, Oktibbeha | | |
| James Calhoun Rice | 1936–1944 | Adams | Democratic | 1889–? |
| Earl S. Richardson | 1916–1920 1932–1936 1940–1943 | Neshoba | Democratic | 1879–1943 |
| Tally D. Riddell | 1940–1944 | 14th | Democratic | 1912–2008 |
| George P. Ritchey | 1936–1940 | Coahoma, Tunica, Quitman | Democratic | 1891–? |
| A. T. Roane | 1892, 1896 | Yalobusha, Grenada | | |
| S. M. Roane | 1882–1886 | Choctaw, Webster, Winston | | |
| W. A. Roane | 1882–1886 | Calhoun, Yalobusha | | |
| W. B. Roberts | 1920–1944 | Bolivar | Democratic | 1861–1940 |
| Ken Robertson | 1968–1976 | Jackson | Democratic | 1939– |
| Thomas E. Robertson | 1992–2008 | Jackson | Republican | 1955– |
| H. C. Robinson | 1865–1867 | Kemper, Neshoba | | |
| Harmon Robinson | 1976–1980 | Chickasaw, Clay, Lowndes | Democratic | 1925–? |
| Mitchell Robinson | 1940–1944 1948–1960 | Hinds, Warren | Democratic | 1894–? |
| Robin Robinson | 2024– | Forrest, Greene, Jones, Wayne | Republican | 1956– |
| Buddy Rogers | 1964–1972 | Covington, Jasper, Smith | Democratic | 1934– |
| Fred M. Rogers | 1967–1976 | Kemper, Lauderdale | Democratic | 1916–1996 |
| W. D. Rogers | 1878–1882 | Calhoun, Yalobusha | | |
| W. F. Rogers | 1890–1894 | Winston, Kemper | | |
| Bill Rosenblatt | 1956–1960 | Amite, Wilkinson | Democratic | 1907–? |
| Cy Hart Rosenblatt | 1984–1992 | Hinds | Democratic | 1954– |
| Charlie Ross | 1998–2008 | Madison, Rankin | Republican | 1956– |
| Fred A. Ross | 1936–1940 | Lauderdale | Democratic | 1909–? |
| Jim Buck Ross | 1964–1968 | Rankin | Democratic | 1917–? |
| S. M. Ross | 1886–1890 | Calhoun, Yalobusha | Democratic | |
| H. K. Rouse | 1944–1948 | 40th | Democratic | 1874–? |
| Elias Alford Rowan | 1896–1904 1908–1912 | Copiah | Democratic | 1837–1912 |
| John Rundle | 1948–1952 | Yalobusha, Grenada | Democratic | 1872–? |
| Hardin D. Runnels | 1825–1828 | Hinds, Yazoo, Warren, Jefferson, Copiah | | |
| Harmon Runnels | 1837–1838 | Lawrence, Marion | | |
| Howell W. Runnels | 1819–1821 | Lawrence, Covington, Wayne | | |
| W. T. Rush | 1892, 1896 | Leflore, Tallahatchie | | |
| W. R. Rushing | 1870–1871 | Attala, Neshoba, Leake | | |
| Benson M. Russell | 1924–1928 | 8th | Democratic | 1880–? |
| Lee M. Russell | 1912–1916 | Lafayette | Democratic | 1875–1943 |
| Samuel Edmond Sample | 1928–1932 | 21st | Democratic | 1893–? |
| Samuel Neely Sample | 1908–1912 | Homes | Democratic | 1856–1909 |
| H. L. Samuels | 1960–1964 | Lafayette | Democratic | 1889–? |
| Hall W. Sanders | 1912–1916 | Leflore, Tallahatchie | Democratic | 1880–? |
| Stokes Sanders | 1944–1956 | Attala | Democratic | 1888–? |
| Wiley Sanders | 1900–1916 | Attala | Democratic | 1852–1937 |
| Ike Sanford | 1964–1968 1972–1980 | Covington, Jefferson Davis, Jones, Lawrence, Marion | Democratic | 1910–1980 |
| Havis H. Sartor | 1952–1956 | Clarke, Jasper | Democratic | 1914–? |
| John B. Saxon | 1924–1928 | 2nd | Democratic | 1882–? |
| Vince Scoper | 1980–1984 1988–2004 | Jones | Republican | 1933–2014 |
| Abram M. Scott | 1822 1826–1827 | Wilkinson | National Republican | 1785–1833 |
| George Y. Scott | 1892–1894 | Bolivar | | |
| John R. Scott | 1968–1972 | Franklin, Jefferson, Lincoln | Democratic | 1921–? |
| William R. Scott | 1904–1908 | Clay, Webster | Democratic | 1868–? |
| E. N. Scudder | 1892–1894 | Sharkey, Issaquena | | ?–1943 |
| Jacob J. Seal | 1870–1873 | Hancock, Harrison, Jackson, Marion, Greene, Perry | | ?–1873 |
| Roderick Seal | 1865–1867 1886–1890 | Hancock, Harrison, Jackson | Democratic | 1817–? |
| C. Stevens Seale | 1993–1996 | Forrest, Lamar | Republican | 1953–2022 |
| J. Lem Seawright | 1900–1904 1908–1912 | Oktibbeha, Choctaw | Democratic | 1871–? |
| Billy Semmes | 1956–1960 | Grenada, Yalobusha | Democratic | 1923–? |
| Joseph Sessions | 1821–1822 | Adams | | |
| J. F. Sessions | 1874–1875 | Pike, Lawrence | | |
| Mike Seymour | 2016– | Jackson, Pearl River, Stone | Republican | 1959– |
| B. W. Sharbrough | 1900–1904 | Jasper, Clarke | Democratic | 1858–? |
| J. E. Sharkey | 1850–1852 | Warren | | |
| D. C. Sharpe | 1848 | Holmes, Sunflower | Democratic | 1812/13–? |
| Robert S. Sheffield | 1920–1924 | 38th | Democratic | 1872–? |
| T. M. Shelton | 1902–1904 | Claiborne, Jefferson | | |
| Francis M. Sheppard | 1900–1904 | Wayne, Jones, Perry, Greene | Democratic | 1868–1948 |
| John H. Sherrard | 1892–1896 | Coahoma, Tunica, Quitman | | |
| Walton Shields | 1917–1927 | 29th | Democratic | 1870–1927 |
| Nathan Shirley | 1874–1878 | Monroe, Chickasaw | Republican | |
| M. Arthur Shook | 1936–1944 | Alcorn, Prentiss, Tishomingo | Democratic | 1892–? |
| J. R. Shoup | 1870 | Panola, Lafayette | | |
| Ronnie Shows | 1980–1988 | Covington, Jefferson Davis, Jones | Democratic | 1947– |
| Henry H. Sikes | 1912–1916 | Oktibbeha, Choctaw | Democratic | 1854–? |
| Derrick Simmons | 2011– | Bolivar, Coahoma, Washington | Democratic | 1976– |
| Ed Simmons | 1952–1956 | Jefferson Davis, Marion, Walthall | Democratic | 1890–1964 |
| Hansford L. Simmons | 1928–1932 1936–1940 | Franklin, Pike | Democratic | 1889–? |
| Sarita Simmons | 2020– | Bolivar, Sunflower, Tallahatchie | Democratic | 1977– |
| William Taylor Simmons | 1908–1912 | Rankin, Smith | Democratic | 1872–? |
| Willie Lee Simmons | 1993–2020 | Bolivar, Sunflower, Tallahatchie | Democratic | 1947– |
| J. M. Simonton | 1859–1861 1864–1868 1884–1888 1892–1894 | Itawamba, others | Democratic | 1830–1898 |
| Benjamin D. Simpson | 1904–1912 | Union, Tippah, Benton, Marshall, Tate | Democratic | 1860–? |
| Booth Simpson | 1952–1956 | Union, Tippah, Marshall, Benton, Tate | Democratic | 1925–? |
| Hubert R. Simpson | 1936–1940 | Itawamba, Lee, Monroe | Democratic | 1883–? |
| William H. Sims | 1876–1878 | Clay, Oktibbeha, Lowndes | Democratic | 1837–1920 |
| Otho R. Singleton | 1848–1854 | Madison, Scott | Democratic | 1814–1889 |
| T. S. Singleton | 1880–1884 | Madison | | |
| Josiah Skinner | 1817, 1819 | Wayne, Greene, Jackson | | |
| Thomas O. Slaughter | 1932–1936 | Jones, Wayne | Democratic | 1879–? |
| P. Nevin Sledge | 1984–1993 | Bolivar, Coahoma | Democratic | 1921–2023 |
| Charles C. Slocumb | 1826 | Franklin | | |
| Archibald Smith | 1833 | Amite, Franklin | | |
| Arthur Smith | 1842–1843 | Lawrence, Marion | | |
| Cotesworth P. Smith | 1830–1831 | Wilkinson | Whig | 1807–1862 |
| David Smith | 1977–1988 | Forrest, Harrison, Perry, Stone | Democratic | 1951– |
| Edward W. Smith | 1928–1932 | 34th | Democratic | 1894–? |
| Ephraim Smith | 1839 | Lauderdale, Kemper | | |
| F. M. Smith Jr. | 1984–1988 | Jasper, Jones, Wayne | Democratic | 1942– |
| Frank Ellis Smith | 1948–1951 | Leflore, Tallahatchie | Democratic | 1918–1997 |
| Fred B. Smith | 1920–1924 | 36th | Democratic | 1892–1984 |
| George Smith | 1872–1873 | Kemper, Neshoba | | |
| George C. Smith | 1874–1875 | Bolivar, Coahoma | Republican | |
| George P. Smith | 1980–1988 | Harrison | Democratic | 1935–2021 |
| George R. Smith | 1936–1940 | Harrison, Stone | Democratic | 1895–? |
| George S. Smith | 1870–1874 | Noxubee | | |
| Gordon Lee Smith | 1956–1960 | Leflore, Tallahatchie | Democratic | 1917–2008 |
| H. T. Smith | 1944–1948 | 32nd | Democratic | 1879–? |
| Jewell Smith | 1956–1960 | Clarke, Jasper | Democratic | 1904–? |
| J. C. Smith | 1948–1952 | Jasper, Clarke | Democratic | 1884–? |
| J. J. Smith | 1874–1878 | Copiah, Claiborne | | |
| John F. Smith | 1865–1867 1884–1888 | Covington, Greene, Jones, Marion, Perry, Others Clarke, Jasper | Democratic | 1835–? |
| Lawrence Smith | 1948–1952 | Chickasaw, Calhoun, Pontotoc | Democratic | 1892–? |
| Marion Smith | 1960–1972 | Adams | Democratic | 1932– |
| Martin T. Smith | 1968–1988 | Hancock, Pearl River | Democratic | 1934–2015 |
| Murray F. Smith | 1896–1900 1904–1908 | Hinds, Warren | Democratic | 1850–1909 |
| R. C. Smith | 1882–1886 | Madison | | |
| Rob Smith | 1985–2004 | Copiah, Covington, Rankin, Simpson | Democratic | 1951–2017 |
| Sam H. Smith | 1932–1936 | 31st | Democratic | 1880–1950 |
| Theodore Smith | 1968–1984 | Alcorn, Tippah | Democratic | 1913–? |
| Tony Smith | 2012–2016 | Pearl River, Stone, Harrison, Jackson | Republican | 1962– |
| W. C. Smith | 1964–1968 | Marion, Walthall | Democratic | 1900–1973 |
| Walter R. Smith | 1924–1928 1944–1952 | Monroe, Lee, Itawamba | Democratic | 1875–? |
| James S. Smythe | 1872–1876 | Attala, Leake | | |
| S. W. Smythe | 1874 | Choctaw | | |
| Melanie Sojourner | 2012–2015 2020–2024 | Adams, Amite, Franklin, Pike | Republican | 1968– |
| Thomas H. Somerville | 1896–1900 | Carroll, Montgomery | Democratic | 1850/51–? |
| L. M. Southworth | 1890–1894 | Carroll, Montgomery, Leflore | | |
| J. Donald Spann | 1972–1976 | Hinds | Democratic | 1928–1992 |
| Daniel Sparks | 2020– | Itawamba, Prentiss, Tishomingo | Republican | |
| W. R. Spears | 1882–1884 | Warren | Republican | 1835/6-1884 |
| James W. Spencer | 1912–1916 | Clay, Webster | Democratic | 1861–? |
| Jesse Speight | 1842–1846 | Lowndes | Democratic | 1795–1847 |
| William Spencer | 1822–1823 | Marion, Pike | | |
| Peter Burwell Starke | 1856–1862 | Yazoo, Washington, Bolivar, Issaquena | Democratic | 1813–1888 |
| B. D. Statham | 1953–1956 | Pike, Franklin | Democratic | 1914–? |
| Sandy Steckler | 1972–1980 | Harrison | Democratic | 1940– |
| R. G. Steele | 1852–1856 | Oktibbeha, Chickasaw | | |
| S. A. D. Steele | 1872–1876 | Clarke, Lauderdale | | |
| M. D. L. Stephens | 1865–1867 | Calhoun, Yalobusha | | |
| James S. Stephens | 1912–1916 | Monroe, Lee, Itawamba | Democratic | 1850–? |
| Z. M. Stephens | 1892–1896 | Union, Tippah, Benton, Marshall, Tate | | |
| J. M. Stephenson | 1904–1905 | Scott, Newton | Democratic | 1855–1905 |
| Thomas S. Sterling | 1830–1833 | Wayne, Perry, Jones, Covington, Greene, Hancock, Jackson | | |
| Dallas Stewart | 1912–1916 | Scott, Newton | Democratic | 1875–? |
| Duncan Stewart | 1817 | Wilkinson | | 1761–1820 |
| E. C. Stewart | 1854 | Marion | | |
| Isham Stewart | 1874–1878 | Noxubee, Neshoba, Kemper | Republican | |
| James D. Stewart | 1880–1884 | Hinds, Rankin | | |
| Kenneth Stewart | 1952–1956 | Amite, Wilkinson | Democratic | 1914–? |
| Robert S. Stewart | 1928–1930 | 7th | Democratic | 1880–1930 |
| T. Jones Stewart | 1846–1850 | Adams, Franklin, Wilkinson | Whig | 1800/01–? |
| Jess E. Stockstill | 1920–1924 | 40th | Democratic | 1884–? |
| C. L. Stoddard | 1952–1956 | Monroe, Lee, Itawamba | Democratic | 1896–? |
| Joe Stogner | 1988–2004 | Lamar, Marion, Pearl River, Walthall | Republican | 1939– |
| Ben Stone | 1968–1980 | Harrison | Democratic | 1935– |
| Bill Stone | 2008–2020 | Marshall, Tate | Democratic | 1965– |
| H. D. Stone | 1865–1867 | Choctaw | | |
| John Henry Stone | 1928–1932 | 38th | Democratic | 1875–? |
| John Marshall Stone | 1870–1876 | Alcorn, Itawamba, Prentiss, Tishomingo | Democratic | 1830–1900 |
| John P. Stone | 1920–1924 | 28th | Democratic | 1890–? |
| William A. Stone | 1848–1854 1856–1858 | Marion, Lawrence | Democratic | 1807/08–? |
| Walter Wilson Stone | 1904–1908 | Washington, Sunflower | Democratic | 1840–1930 |
| Alfred Stoner | 1924–1928 | 27th | Democratic | 1888–1956 |
| Charles Stovall | 1817 | Lawrence, Marion, Hancock | | |
| Dees Stribling | 1956–1960 | Leake, Neshoba | Democratic | 1905–? |
| Rolen C. Stribling | 1928–1932 | 17th | Democratic | 1894–? |
| William P. Stribling | 1916–1920 | 25th | Democratic | 1873–1947 |
| Amos Strickland | 1956–1960 | Jones, Wayne | Democratic | 1905–? |
| Edward Strickland | 1920–1924 | 37th | Democratic | 1871–? |
| W. T. Stricklin | 1870–1872 | Lee, Tippah | | |
| Don Strider | 1971–1980 | Grenada, Tallahatchie | Democratic | 1929–? |
| Emerson Stringer | 1968–1988 | Covington, Jefferson Davis, Lawrence, Marion | Democratic | 1940–2013 |
| Thomas W. Stringer | 1870–1871 | Warren | | 1815–1893 |
| E. C. Stuart | 1854 | Lawrence | | |
| Peter Stubblefield | 1916–1920 1932–1940 | Yazoo | Democratic | 1888–1966 |
| Louis E. Stubbs | 1940–1944 | 4th | Democratic | 1902–? |
| Benjamin Suber | 2020– | Calhoun, Chickasaw, Lee, Pontotoc, Yalobusha | Republican | |
| C. W. Sullivan | 1940–1948 | 42nd | Democratic | 1891–? |
| Charles A. Sullivan | 1870–1875 | Lowndes, Oktibbeha | Republican | |
| R. L. Sullivan | 1936–1940 | Lafayette | Democratic | 1890–? |
| Cecil Sumners | 1964–1972 1976–1980 | Itawamba, Monroe, Prentiss, Tishomingo | Democratic | 1920–? |
| Neadom W. Sumrall | 1912–1916 | Washington, Sunflower | Democratic | 1875–? |
| George T. Swann | 1842–1848 | Rankin, Simpson | Democratic | 1808–1877 |
| Charles Swett | 1865–1867 | Warren | | |
| Claude E. Sykes | 1920–1924 | 26th | Democratic | 1866–? |
| Edward Turner Sykes | 1884–1888 | Lowndes | Democratic | 1838–? |
| William G. Sykes | 1920–1924 | 38th | Democratic | 1845–1931 |
| James M. Tait | 1850–1852 | Tunica | | |
| J. E. Talliaferro | 1850–1854 1859–1865 | Lafayette, others | | |
| Arthur Tate | 1979–1980 | Holmes, Madison, Yazoo | Democratic | 1939– |
| Jeff Tate | 2020– | Clarke, Lauderdale | Republican | 1988– |
| Margaret Tate | 1988–1992 | Hancock, Harrison, Pearl River, Stone | Democratic | 1934–2006 |
| C. A. Taylor | 1861–1862 | Tishomingo | | |
| Gene Taylor | 1983–1989 | Hancock, Harrison, Jackson | Democratic | 1953– |
| James M. Taylor | 1896–1898 | Claiborne, Jefferson | Democratic | 1868/69–? |
| J. H. R. Taylor | 1865–1867 | Marshall | | |
| John Peroutt Taylor | 1912–1916 | Carroll, Montgomery | Democratic | 1855–1930 |
| Leroy T. Taylor | 1900–1904 | Monroe, Lee, Itawamba | Democratic | 1846–? |
| N. A. Taylor | 1888–1892 | Tate, Tunica | Democratic | 1851–? |
| R. H. Taylor | 1874–1878 | Panola | | |
| Walter Nesbit Taylor | 1924–1936 | Hinds, Warren | Democratic | 1874–1956 |
| Charles C. Terry | 1876–1880 | Benton, Tippah, Union | | |
| J. Walter Terry | 1936–1940 | Lawrence, Lincoln | Democratic | 1905–? |
| John Terry | 1882–1886 | Kemper, Neshoba | | |
| L. S. Terry | 1864 | Attala, Leake | | |
| G. A. Teunisson | 1892–1896 | Lincoln, Lawrence | | |
| Billy H. Thames | 1980–2008 | Jasper, Jones, Scott, Smith | Democratic | 1944–2013 |
| William Thames | 1859–1865 | Newton, Lauderdale | | |
| Wiley B. Thigpen Jr. | 1924–1928 | 3rd | Democratic | 1883–? |
| John C. Thomas | 1840–1844 | Jasper, Smith, Newton, Scott | | |
| Joseph C. Thomas | 2004–2008 2020– | Sunflower, Humphreys, Madison, Sharkey, Washington, Yazoo | Democratic | 1949– |
| Charles E. Thompson | 1916–1920 | 6th | Democratic | 1889–1986 |
| J. M. Thompson | 1859–1861 | Chickasaw | | |
| J. Y. Thompson | 1842–1846 1850–1852 | Monroe | | |
| Mike Thompson | 2020– | Harrison | Republican | 1976– |
| R. H. Thompson | 1876–1880 | Lincoln, Pike, Lawrence | | |
| Richard E. Thompson | 1916–1920 | 14th | Democratic | 1871–1927 |
| Robert H. Thompson | 1948–1952 | Hinds, Warren | Democratic | 1903–? |
| T. L. Thompson | 1858 | Leake, Attala | | |
| P. R. Thornton | 1874–1878 | Yalobusha, Calhoun | | |
| Stephen Thrasher | 1886–1892 1904–1908 | Claiborne, Jefferson | Democratic | 1833–1913 |
| John S. Throop Jr. | 1955?–1956 | Yalobusha, Grenada | Democratic | 1918–? |
| Stephen Tillman | 1846 | Copiah | Democratic | 1804/05–? |
| Sean Tindell | 2012–2020 | Harrison | Republican | 1973– |
| Gray Tollison | 1996–2020 | Lafayette, Panola | Republican | 1964– |
| Thomas Torrence | 1820 | Amite | | |
| George Torrey | 1850–1854 | Jefferson, Claiborne | | c. 1808–1886 |
| William D. Torrey | 1900–1904 | Claiborne, Jefferson | Democratic | 1850–? |
| J. C. Totten | 1892–1896 | Union, Tippah, Benton, Marshall, Tate | | |
| Solomon Tracy | 1835 | Jefferson, Copiah | | |
| Cornelius Trawick | 1838–1839 | Pike | | |
| Wyndham R. Trigg | 1896–1898 | Washington, Sunflower | Democratic | 1833/34–? |
| Thomas R. Trim | 1936–1940 1944–1948 | Claiborne, Jefferson | Democratic | 1878–? |
| James F. Trotter | 1829–1831 | Lowndes, Rankin, Monroe | Democratic | 1802–1866 |
| Nat Troutt | 1960–1964 | Tate, Benton | Democratic | 1928–? |
| Benjamin A. Tucker Jr. | 1912–1916 | Union, Tippah, Benton, Marshall, Tate | Democratic | 1884–? |
| Jack Tucker | 1960–1980 | Quitman, Tate, Tunica | Democratic | 1921–? |
| Tilghman Tucker | 1838–1842 | Lowndes | Democratic | 1802–1859 |
| William F. Tucker | 1908–1912 | Amite, Wilkinson | Democratic | 1869–? |
| W. F. Turman | 1952–1956 | DeSoto | Democratic | 1895–1957 |
| J. L. Turnage | 1888–1892 | Lee, Monroe, Itawamba | Democratic | 1852–? |
| Bennie Turner | 1993–2012 | Clay, Lowndes, Noxubee, Oktibbeha | Democratic | 1948–2012 |
| Edward Turner | 1844, 1846 | Jefferson | Whig | 1778–1860 |
| S. E. Turner | 1926–1928 | 26th | Democratic | 1870–? |
| Angela Turner-Ford | 2013– | Clay, Lowndes, Noxubee, Oktibbeha | Democratic | 1971– |
| White Turpin | 1820 | Adams | | |
| M. H. Tuttle | 1875–1878 | Carroll, Montgomery, Leflore | | |
| Littleton Upshur | 1932–1936 | 27th | Democratic | 1890–? |
| Bob Usey | 1980–1992 | Harrison | Republican | 1940– |
| Calvin B. Vance | 1878–1882 1908–1912 1916–1920 | Panola | Democratic | 1842–1926 |
| James Alexander Ventress | 1842–1846 | Wilkinson | | 1805–1867 |
| W. P. S. Ventress | 1900–1902 | Amite, Wilkinson | Democratic | 1854–1911 |
| J. D. Vertner | 1886–1888 | Claiborne | Democratic | 1837–? |
| Henry W. Vick | 1828–1831 | Hinds, Madison, Rankin, Washington, Warren, Yazoo | | |
| John M. Vick | 1936–1940 | Benton, Marshall, Tate, Tippah, Union | Democratic | 1903–? |
| James F. Waddell | 1932–1936 | 14th | | 1900–1946 |
| V. B. Waddell | 1882–1883 | DeSoto, Tunica, Tate | | ?–1883 |
| Walter Hall Waddell | 1944–1948 | 12th | Democratic | 1871–1954 |
| Battaille H. Wade | 1916–1920 | 10th | Democratic | 1856–1926 |
| John Waldrop | 1975–1984 | Benton, Pontotoc, Union | Democratic | 1929–? |
| Felix Walker | 1839 | DeSoto, Tunica, Coahoma, Bolivar | | |
| George Walker | 1946–1960 | Washington, Sunflower, Humphreys | Democratic | 1883–1971 |
| J. P. Walker | 1884–1892 | Lauderdale | Democratic | 1840–1898 |
| Jacob C. Walker | 1912–1916 | Bolivar | Democratic | 1880–? |
| William B. Walker | 1904–1906 | Monroe, Lee, Itawamba | Democratic | 1859–? |
| Jehu Wall | 1837–1846 | Amite | | |
| John Wall | 1846 | Amite | Whig | 1799/1800–? |
| Columbus W. Walley | 1916–1920 | 2nd | Democratic | 1876–1936 |
| Shannon Walley | 2004–2008 | George, Greene, Stone, Wayne | Democratic | 1974– |
| Johnnie E. Walls Jr. | 1993–2012 | Bolivar, Washington | Democratic | 1945– |
| W. C. Wallis | 1944–1948 | 36th | Democratic | 1896–? |
| Jim Walters | 1972–1980 | Hinds | Democratic | 1943– |
| James Walton | 1837–1843 | Choctaw, Oktibbeha, Chickasaw | | |
| Giles Ward | 2008–2016 | Leake, Neshoba, Winston | Republican | 1958– |
| Alexander Warner | 1870–1876 | Madison | Republican | 1827–1914 |
| Henry George Warren | 1940–1944 | 19th | Democratic | 1910–? |
| J. Campbell Warren | 1948–1952 | Kemper, Winston | Democratic | 1901–? |
| J. Elbert Warren | 1932–1936 | 31st | Democratic | 1881–? |
| D. M. Watkins | 1892–1894 | Simpson, Covington, Marion, Pearl River | | 1857/8–1946 |
| P. M. Watkins | 1952–1956 1960–1968 | Claiborne, Jefferson | Democratic | 1917–2007 |
| Troy Watkins | 1972–1980 | Adams, Amite, Franklin, Jefferson, Wilkinson | Democratic | 1925–? |
| Arnie Watson | 1956–1960 1964–1972 | Attala, Carroll, Montgomery | Democratic | 1909–? |
| J. Stewart Watson | 1936–1952 | Holmes | Democratic | 1873–1952 |
| Michael Watson | 2008–2020 | Jackson | Republican | 1977– |
| John Watts | 1840–1842 | Wayne, Jones, Covington, Clarke | | |
| John Watts | 1872–1873 | Jasper, Scott, Newton | | |
| Samuel B. Watts | 1892–1896 | Lauderdale | | |
| Augustus E. Weathersby | 1896–1898 | Lincoln, Lawrence | Democratic | 1864/65–? |
| J. M. Weaver | 1904–1908 | Monroe, Lee, Itawamba | | |
| B. R. Webb | 1854–1858 | Pontotoc | | c. 1811–1860 |
| Robert S. Weems | 1936–1940 | Newton, Scott | Democratic | 1891–? |
| Pat Welch | 1988–1993 | Amite, Franklin, Pike | Democratic | 1947–2009 |
| Ben H. Wells | 1896–1900 | Hinds | Democratic | 1860/61–? |
| Absolom M. West | 1854–1861 1878–1882 | Holmes, Sunflower (1854–1861) Marshall (1878–1882) | Democratic Greenback | 1818–1894 |
| William Warren West | 1908–1912 | Wayne, Jones, Perry, Greene | Democratic | 1880–? |
| Neil Whaley | 2018– | Marshall, Tate | Republican | 1988– |
| Ramsey Wharton | 1900–1904 | Hinds, Warren | Democratic | 1855–1908 |
| Richard Wharton | 1890–1896 | Chickasaw, Pontotoc, Calhoun | | |
| Zack Whisenant | 1956–1960 | Union, Tippah, Marshall, Benton, Tate | Democratic | 1903– |
| Berta Lee White | 1968–1976 | Kemper, Lauderdale | Democratic | 1914–2004 |
| George W. White | 1874–1878 | Wilkinson | | c. 1841–? |
| James J. B. White | 1848–1852 | Issaquena, Yazoo, Washington, Bolivar | Whig | 1802/03–? |
| James M. White | 1932–1936 | 24th | Democratic | 1902–1966 |
| John R. White | 1984–2004 | Itawamba, Lee, Prentiss, Tishomingo | Democratic | 1937– |
| Richard White | 1989–2008 | Hinds | Republican | 1949– |
| Royce White | 1952–1956 | Monroe, Lee, Itawamba | Democratic | 1916–? |
| James Whitfield | 1852 | Lowndes | Democratic | 1791–1875 |
| Samuel Whitman Jr. | 1908–1912 | Jasper, Clarke | Democratic | 1866–? |
| J. J. Whitney | 1884–1888 | Jefferson, Franklin | Democratic | |
| Luther A. Whittington | 1928–1936 1944–1948 | Adams | Democratic | 1881–? |
| William Madison Whittington | 1916–1920 | 27th | Democratic | 1878–1962 |
| Fred Wicker | 1968? | | | 1924–2022 |
| Roger Wicker | 1988–1995 | Lee | Republican | 1951– |
| Brice Wiggins | 2012– | Jackson | Republican | 1971– |
| William Brooke Wilbourn | 1846–1850 | Yalobusha | Democratic | 1810/11–? |
| C. A. Wilcox | 1880–1882 | Neshoba, Kemper | | |
| J. P. Wilemon | 2004–2020 | Itawamba, Prentiss, Tishomingo | Democratic | 1940– |
| Bart Williams | 2020– | Choctaw, Montgomery, Oktibbeha, Webster | Republican | 1966– |
| Eddie Williams | 1957–1964 | DeSoto | Democratic | 1899–? |
| Frank T. Williams | 1936–1940 | Covington, Simpson | Democratic | 1904–? |
| G. Edward Williams | 1916–1918 | 12th | Democratic | 1885–1940 |
| John H. Williams | 1844–1848 | Chickasaw, Oktibbeha | Whig | |
| Jeremiah M. P. Williams | 1871–1875 | Adams | Republican | ?–1884 |
| Kenneth O. Williams | 1988–1993 | Columbia, DeSoto, Quitman, Tunica | Democratic | 1924–2000 |
| Lamar Q. C. Williams | 1916–1920 | 13th | Democratic | 1881–1934 |
| Murray L. Williams | 1952–1955? | Yalobusha, Grenada | Democratic | 1921–? |
| Thomas B. Williams | 1924–1928 | 17th | Democratic | 1883–? |
| Thomas Marvin Williams | 1952–1968 | Holmes | Democratic | 1890–1967 |
| W. A. Williams | 1944–1948 | 6th | Democratic | 1890–? |
| C. M. Williamson | 1888–1896 | Hinds | Democratic | 1855–? |
| Gloria Williamson | 2000–2008 | Neshoba, Winston, Leake | Democratic | 1944/5–2014 |
| Nate S. Williamson | 1944–1952 | Lauderdale | Democratic | 1893–? |
| R. P. Willing Jr. | 1894–1896 | Copiah | Democratic | 1863–1918 |
| William Willis | 1821 | Warren, Claiborne | | |
| B. E. Wilson | 1922–1924 | 35th | Democratic | |
| George A. Wilson | 1888–1892 | Holmes | Democratic | |
| George E. Wilson | 1900–1904 | Leake, Neshoba | Democratic | 1869–? |
| Jefferson Wilson | 1858–1868 | Pontotoc | | |
| Leon Wilson | 1976–1980 | Calhoun, Choctaw, Montgomery, Webster | Democratic | 1926–? |
| Samuel L. Wilson | 1882–1886 | Monroe, Chickasaw | | |
| George Winchester | 1837 | Adams | Whig | 1794–1851 |
| E. P. Windham | 1940–1944 | 20th | Democratic | 1911–? |
| C. P. Winn | 1932–1940 | DeSoto | Democratic | 1878–? |
| Fountain Winston | 1826–1830 1833 | Adams | | 1793–1834 |
| J. W. Winter | 1892–1896 | Chickasaw, Calhoun, Pontotoc | | |
| William Aylmer Winter | 1924–1928 1932–1936 1940–1944 | Grenada | Democratic | 1872–1952 |
| D. M. Wisdom | 1866–1867 | Tishomingo | | |
| Seelig Wise | 1964–1968 | Coahoma | Republican | 1913–2004 |
| Sterling A. Withers | 1912–1916 | Coahoma, Quitman, Tunica | Democratic | 1877–? |
| W. F. Withers | 1842–1846 | Tishomingo | | |
| J. M. Witherspoon | 1857 | Lowndes | | |
| Tammy Witherspoon | 2016–2021 | Adams, Amite, Pike, Walthall, Wilkinson | Democratic | 1968– |
| F. A. Wolf | 1865–1867 | Tippah | | |
| Oscar O. Wolfe Jr. | 1942–1952 | Bolivar | Democratic | 1890–1978 |
| Henry H. Womble | 1920–1924 | 27th | Democratic | 1870–1965 |
| T. A. Wood | 1888–1892 1896–1898 | Clarke, Jasper | Democratic | 1852–1936 |
| Clyde Woodfield | 1987–2000 | Harrison | Democratic | 1932–2001 |
| Ellis T. Woolfolk | 1926–1928 | 34th | Democratic | 1877–? |
| Marvin T. Wooten | 1952–1956 | Leake, Neshoba | Democratic | 1914–? |
| Fielding L. Wright | 1928–1932 | 20th | Democratic | 1895–1956 |
| Sam Wright | 1972–1980 | Hinds | Democratic | 1926–? |
| Lee Yancey | 2008–2012 | Madison, Rankin | Republican | 1968– |
| Barbara Yancy | 1971–1972 | Calhoun, Monroe, Chickasaw, Clay | Democratic | 1934–1996 |
| Jesse Yancy | 1968–1970 | Calhoun, Monroe, Chickasaw, Clay | Democratic | 1926–1970 |
| Archibald S. Yarbrough | 1900–1908 | Panola | Democratic | 1840–? |
| George Yarbrough | 1956–1968 1972–1980 | DeSoto, Lafayette, Marshall | Democratic | 1916–1988 |
| Henry Clay Yawn | 1916–1920 1928–1932 | 40th, 4th (1916-1917) | Democratic | 1859–1936 |
| William Yerger | 1863–1864 | Hinds | Whig | 1816–1872 |
| William Gwin Yerger | 1886–1890 | Washington | Democratic | 1840–? |
| W. S. Yerger | 1865–1867 | Washington, Yazoo, Bolivar, Issaquena | | |
| M. C. Young | 1928–1944 | Monroe, Lee, Itawamba | Democratic | 1879–? |
| Samuel R. Young | 1912–1916 | Adams | Democratic | 1846–? |
| T. W. Young | 1902–1904 | Chickasaw, Calhoun, Pontotoc | | |
| Charles Younger | 2014– | Lowndes, Monroe | Republican | 1963– |
| Julius C. Zeller | 1920–1932 | 19th | Democratic | 1871–1938 |

== See also ==
- List of Mississippi state legislatures
