= Senator Bush (disambiguation) =

Prescott Bush (1895–1972) was a U.S. Senator from Connecticut from 1952 to 1963.

Senator Bush may also refer to:

- C. R. Bush (1872–1958), Mississippi State Senate
- Charles P. Bush (1809–1857), Michigan State Senate
- E. Ogden Bush (1898–1987), New York State Senate
- John T. Bush (1811–1888), New York State Senate
- Melinda Bush (born 1956), Illinois State Senate
- Nellie T. Bush (1888–1963), Arizona State Senate
