= A. S. Dowd =

American politician

A. S. Dowd was a state legislator in Mississippi. He served as president of the Mississippi Senate. Elected in 1869, The Clarion-Ledger identified him as a Radical Republican. He served two terms representing Coahoma County. He was elected president of the senate pro tem. He was preceded in office by H. Mosely and succeeded by C. M. Bowles in 1872.
