= William Taylor Simmons =

Mississippi state legislator (1872-?)

William Taylor Simmons (November 25, 1872-?) was a teacher, county school superintendent, and farmer who served as a state legislator in Mississippi.

His father John T. Simmons also served in Mississippi's legislature from 1892 to 1894, and his mother's father, Augustus Sartor, fought in the Seminole Wars.

He attended Montrose High School and Sylvarena High School. A Democrat, he was elected to the Mississippi Senate in 1907. He married Nora Smith and they had four children.

He served on a legislative committee.

== See also ==
- List of former members of the Mississippi State Senate
