= Crowell Armstrong =

American politician, football player

Member of the Mississippi Senate

Personal details
- Party: Democratic; Republican
- Occupation: Politician, lobbyist
- Known for: Member of the Mississippi Senate

Crowell Armstrong is an American former politician, lobbyist, and college football player. He served in the Mississippi Senate.

Armstrong played football for the Ole Miss Rebels as a linebacker. He played in the 1971 Peach Bowl. He lived in Houston, Mississippi.

Armstrong was documented as both a Republican and Democrat. He served as president of the Mississippi Retail and Grocers Association.

== See also ==
- List of former members of the Mississippi State Senate
