= Marion Enoch Boyles =

American politician (1925–1992)

Marion Enoch Boyles (August 13, 1925 – 1992) was a state legislator in Mississippi. He was born in Ruleville, MIssissippi. A Democrat, he served in the Mississippi Senate from 1960 to 1964. He attended Mississippi Delta Junior College, where he met his wife, Betty. After marriage the couple moved to Starkville where he completed his college degree at Mississippi State University. He was married for 43 years and was a teacher and school principal, as well as a member of the Mississippi Education Association. He was a Baptist, and a Freemason.

== See also ==
- List of former members of the Mississippi State Senate
