= Henry Wallis Bradshaw =

American politician (1869–1962)

Henry Wallis Bradshaw (September 8, 1869 – 1962) was a Baptist minister, farmer and politician in Mississippi. He served in the Mississippi House of Representatives from 1900 to 1902 and in the Mississippi Senate from 1912 to 1914, 1920 to 1922, and 1928 to 1932.

He was born in Cooperville, Mississippi. He belonged to several fraternal organizations.

A Democrat, he was a candidate to be a national delegate in 1912.

== See also ==
- List of former members of the Mississippi State Senate
