= William A. Boyd =

American politician (1833–1911)

William Allen Boyd (October 27, 1833–1911) was a school principal, farmer, state legislator, and constitutional convention delegate in Mississippi. He was a Democrat. He married Sarah Jane Smith.

Boyd was born in South Carolina to John Lyon Boyd and Sarah née Gray Boyd. He attended Bamboo Academy near Ripley, Mississippi and the University of Mississippi (class of 1854). He served in the Mississippi House of Representatives and Mississippi Senate. He was also a delegate to Mississippi's 1890 constitutional convention.

== See also ==
- List of former members of the Mississippi State Senate
