= Jacob J. Seal =

American politician

Jacob J. Seal (died October 4, 1873) was a state senator in Mississippi. He represented Hancock County from 1870 to 1873. Seal was killed by G. W. Maynard on October 4, 1873, in Bay St. Louis, Mississippi. The coroner's jury's verdict was that it was a willful murder.

Seal was Baptized October 5, 1873 by priest H. Ledu of Our Lady of the Gulf Catholic Church of Bay St Louis, Mississippi.

He was preceded by Roderick Seal and succeeded by J. P. Carter.

[[Daniel B. Seal]] was a state representative from Hancock County.
