= Hudie Pitts =

American politician (1905–??)

Hudie Pitts (February 12, 1905 – ?) was a Mississippi politician who served in the Mississippi Senate between 1960–1968. He lost reelection in 1967. He farmed.
