= William H. Gray (Mississippi politician) =

American politician

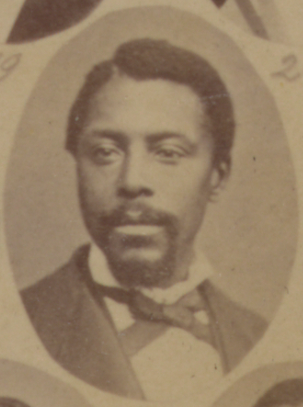

William H. Gray (March 2, 1841 – February 14, 1919) was a Baptist minister and state legislator in Mississippi. He served in the Mississippi Senate during the Reconstruction era.

He was an outspoken advocate for civil rights and equal protection.

He was appointed a trustee of Tougaloo University. He sang at the Mt. Helm Colored Baptist Church on Thanksgiving Day in 1870.

After departing Mississippi he was a church leader in Kentucky and then Illinois. He was involved in controversies and accused of embezzling money.

== See also ==
- African American officeholders from the end of the Civil War until before 1900
