= Green Millsaps =

American politician (1812–1885)

- Born: April 26, 1812
- Died: March 28, 1885 (aged 72)
- Occupation: state legislator in Mississippi

Green Millsaps (April 26, 1812 – March 28, 1885) was a state legislator in Mississippi. He represented Claiborne County in the Mississippi Senate from 1870 to 1873 He was elected to the state senate during the Reconstruction era in December 1869 and served when Republicans, often referred to as Radical Republicans, held office.
