= Elson K. Collins =

American politician (1911–??)

Elson K. Collins (December 17, 1911 – ?) was a politician who served in the Mississippi Senate between 1960–1972. He was a Democrat. He chaired the Judiciary Committee. Before his tenure in office, Collins was the prosecuting attorney of Jones County between 1945-1952.
