= Peter Barnabas Barrow =

American politician (c.1840–1906)

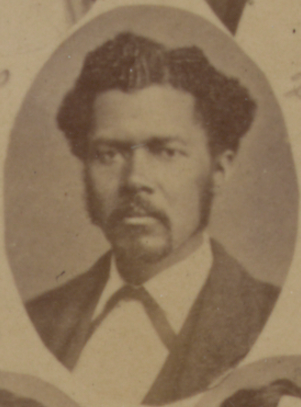

Peter Barnabas Barrow (died 1906) was a slave, soldier, state legislator, and minister in the United States. He served in the Mississippi Senate, and Mississippi House of Representatives 1870–1871. A photo of him is part of the Mississippi State University Libraries collection. Later in life he established a Baptist church, Calvary Baptist Church, in Spokane, Washington, and served as its pastor. He owned an apple orchard.

Barrow was believed to have been born into slavery in 1840 near Petersburg, Virginia, and to have grown up on a plantation near Cosita, Alabama. He was freed by the Union Army in 1864. In 1906 he was killed by a streetcar in Tacoma, Washington.
