= Thomas Vaughan Noland =

Mississippi Public Official

Thomas Vaughan Noland (March 4, 1835 - May 7, 1909) was a public official in Mississippi.

He graduated from Princeton College in 1856. He married Lydia Julia Tigner.

He served as mayor of Woodville, Mississippi (1871 - 1878). He served in the Mississippi House of Representatives (1877 - 1881) and Mississippi State Senate (1882 - 1886).
