= John W. Fewell =

American politician

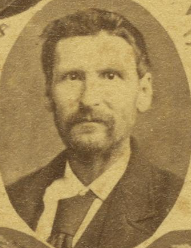
John W. Fewell from the Mississippi Legislature 1878 composite

John Woodbury Fewell (October 18, 1844 - December 26, 1906) was a Confederate officer, lawyer, politician, and judge in Mississippi. He was elected to the Mississippi Senate in 1875 and also served as a delegate at the 1890 Mississippi Constitutional Convention.

He proposed allowing women's suffrage to property owners as a way to increase the white vote. The proposed plan would have restricted women from casting their own ballots, however. The plan was criticized for using white women to protect white men from blacks. He served as a state senator representing Clarke County, Mississippi from 1876 to 1878.

He served in the Confederate Army. He was captured and imprisoned by the Union Army and subsequently exchanged. He suffered a wound to his leg in a subsequent battle and was taken prisoner. His leg was amputated. He married Olivia Gaines in 1870.
