= E. M. Alexander =

American physician & politician (1830–1906)

Member of the Mississippi State Senate from the 23rd district
- In office January 1872 – 1873
- Preceded by: W. T. Stricklin
- Succeeded by: Clarence Cullens

Member of the Mississippi House of Representatives from the Tippah County district
- In office 1871

Personal details
- Born: December 20, 1830 Monroe County, Mississippi, U.S.
- Died: February 22, 1906 (aged 75)
- Party: Democratic

Eli Marion Alexander (December 20, 1830 - February 22, 1906) was an American physician and Democratic politician. He served in the Mississippi State Senate from 1872 to 1874, and in the Mississippi House of Representatives in 1871.

== Biography ==
Eli Marion Alexander was born in Monroe County, Mississippi, on December 20, 1830. He studied medicine in the University of Louisville medical department. He then attended Jefferson Medical College, where he graduated with a M. D. degree in March 1859. He then practiced medicine in Ripley, Mississippi, until stopping due to bad health in 1870. During the American Civil War, Alexander served as the medical director of the 5th Mississippi Militia with the rank of lieutenant colonel. His unit was moved to the 2nd Regiment of Mississippi State Troops. Shortly after his service began, Alexander was forced to resign from it due to bad health. He represented Tippah County in the Mississippi House of Representatives in 1871. In 1871, Alexander was elected to represent the 23rd District in the Mississippi State Senate and served in the 1872 and 1873 sessions. He then resigned from the Senate after two years in office. In September 1875, Alexander was elected to be the Permanent Chairman of the Democratic-Conservative Convention of Tippah County. In August 1883, Alexander was heavily considered as a candidate for the State House.

Anderson died on February 22, 1906.

== Personal life ==
Alexander married Virginia V. Sherry in January 1869.
