= Albert G. Packer =

American politician and military personnel

Albert G. Packer was a brigadier general, state senator, and Adjutant-General of Mississippi. He served as a state senator in Mississippi during the Reconstruction era, representing the fourteenth district.

Packer reported on officers appointed to Mississippi's militia. Requests for supplies he sent were recorded.
