= Walter Vernon Moore =

American politician (1927–1976)

Walter Vernon Moore Jr. (February 9, 1927 – January 12, 1976) was a state legislator in Mississippi. He served in the Mississippi Senate between 1960–1968. He was a dairyman.

On January 12, 1976, it was reported he accidentally shot and killed himself with a shotgun in his bedroom closet.
