= Moses Jackson =

Mississippi state legislator

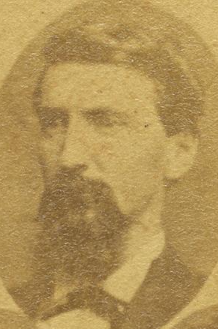
Portrait of Moses Jackson from the 1878 legislature

Moses Jackson (January 14, 1822 - November 28, 1895) was a Confederate Army officer during the Civil War and a state legislator in Mississippi. He was accused of being a ringleader of violent Democratic Party election activities He served in the state legislature immediately prior to the Civil War, after it, and again after Reconstruction ended. He served in the state house and as a state senator for Wilkinson County, Mississippi.

Moses Jackson was born January 14, 1822 in Amite County, Mississippi. He served in the Mississippi House of Representatives in 1861 and 1863. He fought in the Confederate Army during the Civil War, and was eventually promoted to lieutenant colonel of the 33rd Mississippi Infantry Regiment. He returned to the state legislature and served in the Mississippi Senate from 1865 to 1867 after the war and again as a state senator in 1877 after Reconstruction for two more terms. Jackson died at his home on November 28, 1895.

== See also ==
- Mississippi Plan
