= Parham McAtee Watkins =

American politician (1917–2007)

Parham McAtee Watkins (January 17, 1917 – 2007) was a member of the Mississippi Senate between 1952-1956 and 1960-1968, and in the Mississippi House of Representatives between 1956-1960. He was a member of a Citizen's Council.
