= Milton U. Mounger =

American politician

Milton Uriah Mounger

Member of the Mississippi Senate
- In office 1911–?

Member of the Mississippi House of Representatives
- In office 1923–?

Personal details
- Born: 1867 Jasper County, Mississippi, U.S.
- Died: 1931 (aged 63–64)
- Party: Democratic Party
- Relatives: Samuel H. Terral (maternal uncle)
- Education: University of Mississippi

Milton U. Mounger (1867-1931) was an American politician. He was elected to the Mississippi Senate in 1911 and to the Mississippi House of Representatives in 1923 and 1927, representing Covington County as a Democrat.
