= Amos Randall Johnston =

Mississippi judge and politician

Amos Randall Johnston (c. 1812 – 1879) was a judge and state senator in Mississippi.

A speech he gave in 1869 was published. He co-authored The Revised Code of the Statute Laws of the State of Mississippi (1871).

He was born in Columbia, Tennessee. He moved to Jackson, Mississippi where he served as editor of a Whig newspaper and was elected circuit clerk in Hinds County. He studied law and moved to Raymond, Mississippi where he was a probate judge.

He was a Whig. His son Frank Johnston was a Mississippi Assistant Attorney General.
