= Jack Alfred Pace =

American politician (1917–2006)

Jack Alfred Pace (March 9, 1917 – January 9, 2006) was a politician from Mississippi who served two terms in the Mississippi Senate between 1960–1964 and 1968–1972.

Pace served in World War Two and saw action in the Battle of the Bulge. In 1946, he founded Pace Oil Company. He was active in many state and local organizations. In 2003, he received a commendation for his public service and philanthropy from the Mississippi House of Representatives.
