= John Gartman =

American state senator in Mississippi in the 19th century

John Gartman was an American state senator in Mississippi. He was a proponent of establishing Lincoln County, Mississippi. He was a Republican.

He was succeeded by Joseph McAfee after Gartman moved from Covington County in 1843.

He was elected in 1869 over Thomas R. Stockdale. He chaired the committee on Humane and Benevolent Institutions. He was succeeded by Hiram Cassedy Jr. in Pike's County.
