= C. R. Bush =

American politician (1872 – 1958)

Member of the Mississippi State Senate
- In office 1936–1944

Personal details
- Born: May 12, 1872 Macon, Mississippi, U.S.
- Died: December 5, 1958 (aged 86)
- Party: Democratic

C. R. Bush (May 12, 1872 – December 5, 1958) was an American politician who served as a Democratic member of the Mississippi State Senate.

== Life and career ==
Bush was born in Macon, Mississippi. He was a farmer.

He served in the Mississippi State Senate from 1936 to 1944.

He died on December 5, 1958, at the age of 86.
