= Countelow M. Bowles =

American cooper, soldier and politician

Countelow M. Bowles (born c. 1840) was a cooper, soldier, and state legislator. He served in the Mississippi House of Representatives and Mississippi Senate. He was a Republican and African American.

Born in about 1840 in Virginia he lived in Cleveland for a few years leading up to the American Civil War.

Bowles joined the 38th United States Colored Infantry Regiment just before the end of the American Civil War in March 1865. He was soon promoted to Corporal before being discharged the following year.

He was elected onto the board of the Bolivar County police in 1869.

Bowles was elected to the Mississippi House of Representatives for the 1870-1871 session, and then served in the Mississippi Senate from 1872 until 1874 and again 1877-1878. He had been removed from his position in 1874 as he had not been in Mississippi for over four months.

== See also ==
- African American officeholders from the end of the Civil War until before 1900
