= 1892–1896 Mississippi Legislature =

←	1890–1892 Mississippi Legislature	1896–1900 Mississippi Legislature	→

Overview
- Legislative body: Mississippi Legislature
- Jurisdiction: Mississippi, United States
- Meeting place: Old Mississippi State Capitol
- Term: 5 January 1892 – 7 January 1896
- Election: 1891 Mississippi elections

Mississippi State Senate
- Members: 45
- President: M. M. Evans
- President pro tempore: R. A. Dean
- Party control: Democratic

Mississippi House of Representatives
- Members: 133
- Speaker: Hugh McQueen Street (1892); James K. Vardaman (1894)
- Party control: Democratic

Sessions
- 1st: 5 January 1892 – 2 April 1892
- 2nd: 2 January 1894 – 10 February 1894

The 1892–1896 Mississippi Legislature was a legislative term in the United States composed of the Mississippi State Senate and the Mississippi House of Representatives that met in two sessions in 1892 and 1894.

== History ==
Elections were held on November 3, 1891. Members were sworn in when the term's first session, and the Legislature's 71st overall, began on January 5, 1892. Both the House and the Senate adjourned on April 2, 1892. The second session of the term, and the Legislature's 72nd overall, began on January 2, 1894. The House adjourned on February 10, 1894. The term ended when members of the 1896–1900 Legislature were sworn in on January 7, 1896.

== Officers ==
=== Senate ===
M. M. Evans, as the incumbent Lieutenant Governor of the state, served as the Senate's President. In the election for President pro tempore, 16th district senator George G. Dillard nominated Robert Aaron Dean, the senator from the 32nd district and incumbent president pro tempore, for the election. Tenth District senator C. S. Coffey nominated John M. Simonton, the 38th district senator and a former President of the Senate (1865–69), for the election. Dean won the election, receiving 30 votes compared to Simonton's 12. Then, D. P. Porter was unanimously elected Secretary of the Senate. Webb Harris was elected Sergeant-at-Arms and W. S. Skellinger was elected Door-Keeper.

=== House ===
When selecting the office of Speaker of the House, the Democratic caucus voted between incumbent speaker James S. Madison (of Noxubee County) and former speaker Hugh McQueen Street (of Lauderdale County) to decide who should receive the Democratic nomination. Street defeated Madison in a 61-59 vote and received the nomination. In the full election that followed, 114 members voted for Street, 17 members were absent or did not vote, and one member (John E. Gore of Webster County) still voted for Madison despite Madison not being the nominee. Robert E. Wilson served as Clerk of the House in 1892.

Street resigned the office of Speaker at the start of the 1894 session. J. K. Vardaman was nominated and then elected to replace Street as Speaker.

== Personnel ==
The Senate had 42 members from 38 districts. Four new senators were sworn in at the start of the 1894 session.

=== Senate ===
Senate District	Senator Name	Residence	Political Affiliation
1st District	Horace Bloomfield	Bay St. Louis	Democrat
2nd District	N. C. Hill	Ellisville	Democrat
3rd District	W. W. Heidelberg	Heidelberg	Democrat
4th District	David M. Watkins	Purvis	Democrat
5th District	James Purvis	Daniel	Democrat (1892) Populist (1894)
6th District	J. Hiram McGehee	Little Spring	Democrat
7th District	J. H. Jones	Woodville	Democrat
8th District	George A. Teunisson	Monticello	Democrat
9th District	Will T. Martin	Natchez	Democrat
10th District	C. S. Coffey	Fayette	Democrat
11th District	R. B. Mayes (1892)	Hazlehurst	Democrat
11th District	R. P. Willing Jr. (1894)	Hazlehurst	Democrat
12th District	C. M. Williamson	Jackson	Democrat
12th District	W. G. Kiger	Brunswick	Democrat
12th District	W. D. Carmichael	Bear Creek	Democrat
13th District	Andrew Y. Freeman	Newton	Democrat
14th District	S. B. Watts	Meridian	Democrat
15th District	A. P. Davis	Spinks	Democrat (1892) Populist (1894)
16th District	George G. Dillard (1892)	Macon	Democrat
16th District	J. R. Prince (1894)	Gholson	Democrat
17th District	A. M. Byrd	Philadelphia	Democrat
18th District	W. G. Kearney	Flora	Democrat
19th District	A. M. Hicks	Myrleville	Democrat
20th District	E. N. Scudder	Mayersville	Democrat
21st District	J. G. Hamilton	Durant	Democrat
22nd District	James P. Allen	Kosciusko	Jeffersonian Democrat
23rd District	R. T. Love	Chester	Democrat (1892) Populist (1894)
24th District	A. F. Fox (1892)	West Point	Democrat
24th District	Frank A. Critz (1894)	West Point	Democrat
25th District	James T. Harrison	Columbus	Democrat
26th District	T. W. Sullivan	Carrollton	Democrat
27th District	W. T. Rush	Greenwood	Democrat
28th District	A. T. Roane	Grenada	Democrat
29th District	J. M. Jayne	Greenville	Democrat
29th District	J. Holmes Baker	Indianola	Democrat
30th District	George Y. Scott (1892)	Rosedale	Democrat
30th District	R. H. Moore (1894)	Rosedale	Democrat
31st District	Richard Wharton	Chesterville	Democrat
31st District	J. W. Winter	Houlka	Democrat
32nd District	R. A. Dean	Glenville	Democrat
33rd District	C. K. Caruthers	Como	Democrat
34th District	J. H. Sherrard	Clarksdale	Democrat
35th District	T. C. Dockery	Love Station	Democrat
36th District	W. J. East	Senatobia	Democrat
36th District	J. C. Totten	Holly Springs	Democrat
36th District	Z. M. Stephens	New Albany	Democrat
37th District	Carroll Kendrick	Kendrick	Conservative Democrat
38th District	J. M. Simonton	Shannon	Democrat
38th District	H. F. Broyles	Central Grove	Democrat

=== House ===
A number of members switched political parties between sessions. Fourteen new representatives were sworn in at the start of the 1894 session to fill vacancies.

County	Representatives	Residence	Party
Adams	George F. Bowles (in Natchez)	Natchez	Republican
Adams	James C. Williams (outside Natchez)	Kingston	Democrat
Alcorn	Geo. W. Bynum	Corinth	Democrat
Alcorn	T. H. Underwood	Kossuth	Democrat
Amite	W. H. Griffin	Liberty	Democrat (1892) Populist (1894)
Amite	Polk Talbert	Gloster	Democrat
Attala	W. P. Ratliff	Kosciusko	Alliance Democrat (1892) Populist (1894)
Attala	L. S. Terry (1892)	McAdams	Alliance Democrat
Attala	S. A. Jackson (1894)	Kosciusko	Democrat
Benton	B. D. Simpson	Ashland	Democrat
Bolivar	G. W. Gayles	Greenville	Democrat
Bolivar	John L. Wiggins (1892)	Rosedale	Democrat
Bolivar	N. Whit Blanchard (1894)	Stafford	Democrat
Calhoun	J. I. Ballinger	Pittsboro	Democrat
Calhoun	T. J. Fox	Slate Springs	Democrat
Carroll	W. C. Chatham	Carrollton	Democrat
Carroll	T. J. King	Vaiden	Alliance Democrat (1892) Populist (1894)
Chickasaw	Sol I. Anderson	Thorn	Alliance Democrat (1892) Populist (1894)
Chickasaw	Frank Burkitt	Okolona	Democrat (1892) Populist (1894)
Choctaw	J. D. Perkins	Weir	Democrat (1892) Populist (1894)
Claiborne	J. G. Spencer	Port Gibson	Democrat
Clarke	John H. Harper	Quitman	Democrat (1892) Populist (1894)
Clay	S. G. Ivy	West Point	Democrat
Clay	W. S. Quin	West Point	Democrat
Coahoma	Sam C. Cook	Clarksdale	Democrat
Coahoma	J. Alcorn Glover	Friars' Point	Democrat
Copiah	W. S. Catchings	Georgetown	Democrat
Copiah	A. B. Guynes	Gallman	Democrat
Copiah	S. W. Miller	Hazlehurst	Democrat
Covington	John W. Watson	Mt. Carmel	Democrat
DeSoto	J. W. Odom	Nesbit	Democrat
DeSoto	L. W. Williamson	Pleasant Hill	Democrat
Franklin	Juan Nix	McCall's Creek	Democrat (1892) Populist (1894)
Greene	G. W. Turner	Leakesville	Democrat
Grenada	William McSwine	Grenada	Democrat
Hancock	J. A. Mauffray	Kiln	Democrat
Harrison	A. M. Dahlgren (1892)	Biloxi	Democrat
Harrison	W. H. Maybin (1894)	Biloxi	Democrat
Hinds	J. A. P. Campbell Jr.	Jackson	Democrat
Hinds	Harry Peyton (1892)	Bolton	Democrat
Hinds	Sid S. Champion (1894)	Edwards	Democrat
Hinds	Wiley H. Potter	Jackson	Democrat
Holmes	J. L. Cotten	Pickens	Democrat
Holmes	B. R. Farr	West	Democrat
Holmes	Walter L. Keirn	Lexington	Democrat
Issaquena	L. C. Dulaney	Mayersville	Democrat
Itawamba	W. P. Reeves	Fulton	Democrat
Jackson	G. W. Davis	Ocean Springs	Democrat
Jasper	M. A. Ryan	Rose Hill	Democrat
Jefferson	J. S. Hicks (1892)	Rodney	Democrat
Jefferson	James Stowers (1894)	Harriston	Democrat
Jones	D. F. Smith	Erata	Democrat
Kemper	J. T. Gewin	DeKalb	Alliance Democrat (1892) Populist (1894)
Kemper	J. R. Key	Oak Grove	Democrat
Lafayette	John W. T. Falkner	Oxford	Democrat
Lafayette	J. R. Stowers	Oxford	Democrat
Lauderdale	H. M. Street (City of Meridian)	Meridian	Democrat
Lauderdale	W. H. Stinson (Outside City)	Meridian	Democrat (1892) Populist (1894)
Lauderdale	W. R. Denton (Whole County)	Hookston	Democrat
Lawrence	John H. Arrington	Monticello	Democrat
Leake	U. S. Roberts	St. Ann	Democrat (1892) Populist (1894)
Lee	T. A. Boggan	Mooresville	Democrat
Lee	O. L. Stribling (1892)	Tupelo	Democrat
Lee	Harvey C. Medford (1894)	Tupelo	Democrat
Leflore	J. K. Vardaman	Greenwood	Democrat
Lincoln	J. A. J. Hart	Bogue Chitto	Democrat
Lowndes	A. S. Payne (East of Tombigbee)	New Hope	Democrat
Lowndes	Thomas A. Stinson (East of Tombigbee)	Steenston	Democrat
Lowndes	W. A. Love (West of Tombigbee)	Crawford	Democrat
Madison	William S. McAllister (1892)	Canton	Democrat
Madison	H. B. Greaves (1894)	Canton	Democrat
Madison	Henry C. Turner	Canton	Democrat
Marion	James R. Robertson	Carley	Democrat
Marshall	Samuel Hinton	Mt. Pleasant	Democrat
Marshall	G. E. Kelsey	Holly Springs	Democrat
Marshall	George W. McKie	Chulahoma	Democrat
Monroe	J. J. Bashan	Aberdeen	Democrat
Monroe	T. R. Caldwell	Amory	Democrat
Monroe	J. D. Durrett	Aberdeen	Democrat
Montgomery	J. P. Taylor	Winona	Democrat
Neshoba	P. G. Walton	Dixon	Democrat
Newton	J. E. Graham	Roscoe	Democrat
Newton	R. H. Taylor (1892)	Newton	Democrat
Newton	Thomas Keith (1894)	Decatur	Democrat
Noxubee	John R. Dinsmore	Macon	Democrat
Noxubee	James S. Madison	Brooksville	Democrat
Noxubee	Thomas J. O'Neil	Macon	Democrat
Oktibbeha	Arthur H. Rice (East)	Oktoc	Democrat
Oktibbeha	C. B. Hannah (West)	Sturges	Democrat
Panola	D. B. Arnold	Pope Stations	Democrat
Panola	J. B. Eckles	Sardis	Democrat
Panola	Samuel R. Lamb	Batesville	Democrat
Pearl River	H. G. Stewart	Poplarville	Democrat
Perry	F. M. Morris	Morriston	Democrat
Pike	S. E. Packwood	Magnolia	Democrat
Pike	James M. Tate	Walker's Ridge	Democrat
Pontotoc	D. W. Fowler	Troy	Democrat (1892) Populist (1894)
Pontotoc	W. P. Hooker Jr. (1892)	Thaxton	Democrat
Pontotoc	Charles B. Mitchell (1894)	Pontotoc	Democrat
Prentiss	W. N. Bellamy	Booneville	Democrat
Prentiss	John H. Gardner	Booneville	Alliance Democrat (1892) Populist (1894)
Quitman	J. U. Abernethy (1892)	Belen	Democrat
Quitman	J. S. Montgomery (1894)	Belen	Democrat
Rankin	James T. Ferguson (1892)	Brandon	Democrat
Rankin	David Puckett (1894)	Brandon	Democrat
Rankin	J. R. Enochs	Brandon	Democrat
Scott	Henry Calhoon (1892)	Lillian	Democrat
Scott	A. Carr (1894)	Gilbert	Populist
Sharkey	George W. Butler	Anguilla	Republican
Simpson	T. N. Touchstone	Harrisville	Democrat
Smith	J. T. Simmons	Sylvarena	Democrat
Sunflower	W. D. Peery	Indianola	Democrat
Tallahatchie	R. R. Buntin	Crevi	Alliance Democrat (1892) Populist (1894)
Tate	Thomas H. Johnston	Coldwater	Democrat
Tate	W. P. Wyatt	Coldwater	Democrat (1892) Populist (1894)
Tippah	W. H. M. Durham	Blue Mountain	Democrat
Tishomingo	S. Laslie Rodgers	Burnsville	Democrat
Tunica	W. J. Nelson	Tunica	Democrat
Union	L. A. Goudelock	Keownville	Democrat
Union	Jesse D. Wade	Sherman	Democrat
Warren	J. M. Harris	Oak Ridge	Democrat
Warren	T. Dabney Marshall	Vicksburg	Democrat
Warren	A. C. Peatross	Vicksburg	Democrat
Washington	W. W. Miller	Hollendale	Democrat
Washington	J. M. Montgomery	Winterville	Democrat
Washington	Thomas Worthington	Leota Landing	Democrat
Wayne	William S. Smith	Mathersville	Democrat
Webster	John E. Gore	Greensboro	Greenbacker (1892) Populist (1894)
Wilkinson	T. V. Noland (1892)	Woodville	Democrat
Wilkinson	John A. Redhead (1894)	Centerville	Democrat
Wilkinson	W. P. S. Ventress	Woodville	Democrat
Winston	J. D. Doss	Webster	Democrat
Yalobusha	David W. Rogers	Water Valley	Democrat
Yalobusha	W. M. Taylor	Coffeeville	Democrat
Yazoo	F. Carothers	Zeiglerville	Democrat
Yazoo	J. G. McGuire	Yazoo City	Democrat
Yazoo	Z. P. Stutts	Yazoo City	Democrat
Flotorial District	Representatives	Residence	Party
Franklin and Lincoln	A. M. Newman	Meadville	Democrat (1892) Populist (1894)
Tippah and Benton	John Y. Murry Jr.	Ripley	Democrat
Claiborne and Jefferson	Stephen Thrasher	Oak Lawn	Democrat
Clarke and Jasper	Joseph E. Terral	Quitman	Democrat
Grenada and Montgomery	James R. Binford	Duck Hill	Democrat
Leake and Winston	D. A. McIntosh (1892)	Louisville	Democrat
Leake and Winston	J. H. Caldwell (1894)	Louisville	Democrat
Harrison and Jackson	C. D. Lancaster	Pass Christian	Democrat
Hinds and Yazoo	W. A. Henry	Yazoo City	Democrat
Lee and Itawamba	David Johnson (1892)	Fulton	Democrat
Lee and Itawamba	A. N. Wilson (1894)	Tupelo	Democrat
