= 1896–1900 Mississippi Legislature =

←	1892–1896 Mississippi Legislature	1900–1904 Mississippi Legislature	→

Overview
- Legislative body: Mississippi Legislature
- Jurisdiction: Mississippi, United States
- Meeting place: Old Mississippi State Capitol
- Term: 7 January 1896 – 2 January 1900
- Election: 1895 Mississippi elections

Mississippi State Senate
- Members: 45
- President: J. H. Jones
- President pro tempore: James T. Harrison
- Party control: Democratic

Mississippi House of Representatives
- Members: 133
- Speaker: James F. McCool
- Party control: Democratic

Sessions
- 1st: 7 January 1896 – 24 March 1896
- 2nd: 27 April 1897 – 27 May 1897
- 3rd: 4 January 1898 – 11 February 1898

The 1896–1900 Mississippi Legislature met in three sessions between 1896 and 1900.

Members were elected on November 7, 1895, to a four-year term. A vast majority of legislators elected were members of the Democratic Party.

== Sessions ==
The first session of the term, and the state's 73rd overall, started on January 7, 1896, for both houses. The House adjourned on March 16, 1896, and the Senate adjourned on March 24, 1896.

The second session of the term, and the state's 74th overall, was a special session called by Governor Anselm J. McLaurin. It convened for both houses on April 27, 1897, and the House adjourned on May 27, 1897.

The third and final session of the term (the state's 75th) first met on January 4, 1898. The session adjourned on February 11, 1898.

The legislative term officially ended when members were sworn in for the 1900–1904 Legislature on January 2, 1900.

== Personnel ==
The Senate had 45 members from 38 districts. James T. Harrison from the 25th District was elected President Pro Tempore, defeating 12th District senator William Gwin Kiger in a 25–20 vote.

The House had 133 members representing different counties of Mississippi. James F. McCool of Attala County was elected to the position of Speaker of the House near-unanimously, with 126 members voting for him and 7 members absent or not voting. When the 1897 session began, 7 new members were sworn in to replace six members who had resigned and one member (Carroll Cooper) who had died in-between sessions. At the beginning of the 1898 session, four new members were sworn in, all replacing members who had died after the 1897 session.

== Officers ==
=== Senate ===
==== Presiding Officer ====
Position	Name	Party	District
President	J. H. Jones	Democratic Party	n/a
President Pro Tempore	James T. Harrison	Democratic Party	25

=== House of Representatives ===
==== Presiding Officer ====
Position	Name	Party	County
Speaker of the House	James F. McCool	Democratic Party	Attala

== Senate ==
All senators were Democrats. John Y. Murry Jr. served as Secretary. Several new senators were sworn in for the 1898 session.

District Number	Counties	Senator Name
1	Hancock, Harrison, Jackson	E. J. Bowers
2	Wayne, Jones, Perry, Greene	Truman Gray
3	Jasper, Clarke	T. A. Wood (1896)
3	Jasper, Clarke	D. W. Heidelberg (1898)
4	Simpson, Covington, Marion, Pearl River	G. W. Ellis
5	Rankin, Smith	Alexander Price
6	Pike, Franklin	William B. Mixon
7	Amite	W. F. Love
8	Lawrence, Lincoln	A. E. Weathersby
9	Adams	James A. Clinton
10	Claiborne, Jefferson	J. M. Taylor
11	Copiah	E. A. Rowan
12	Hinds, Warren	B. H. Wells
12	Hinds, Warren	W. G. Kiger
12	Hinds, Warren	Murray F. Smith
13	Scott, Newton	G. A. McIlhenny
14	Lauderdale	W. H. Hardy
15	Kemper, Winston	H. D. Moore
16	Noxubee	Walter Price
17	Leake	Irvin Miller
18	Madison	Clarence B. Greaves
19	Yazoo	A. M. Hicks
20	Sharkey, Issaquena	H. J. McLaurin
21	Holmes	E. F. Noel
22	Attala	J. C. Clark
23	Oktibbeha, Choctaw	N. Q. Adams
24	Clay, Webster	T. L. Lamb
25	Lowndes	James T. Harrison
26	Carroll, Montgomery	T. H. Somerville (1896)
26	Carroll, Montgomery	T. U. Sisson (1898)
27	Leflore, Tallahatchie	A. C. Bramlett
28	Yalobusha, Grenada	E. L. Brewer
29	Washington, Sunflower	W. R. Trigg
29	Washington, Sunflower	Abram Lewenthal
30	Bolivar	E. H. Moore
31	Chickasaw, Calhoun, Pontotoc	C. B. Mitchell
31	Chickasaw, Calhoun, Pontotoc	J. M. Byars
32	Lafayette	J. W. T. Falkner
33	Panola	L. F. Rainwater
34	Coahoma, Tunica, Quitman	J. V. Cook
35	DeSoto	W. T. Nesbit
36	Union, Tippah, Benton, Tate, Marshall	Will T. McDonald
36	Union, Tippah, Benton, Tate, Marshall	W. A. Boyd
36	Union, Tippah, Benton, Tate, Marshall	M. J. McKinney
37	Tishomingo, Alcorn, Prentiss	Carroll Kendrick
38	Monroe, Lee, Itawamba	H. F. Broyles
38	Monroe, Lee, Itawamba	F. M. Gregory

== House ==
Nevin C. Hathorn and Rufus Prewitt were Populists.

County	Representative Name
Adams	James Pipes
Adams	W. A. Killingsworth
Alcorn	T. H. Underwood
Alcorn	W. J. Lamb
Amite	C. H. Frith
Amite	T. P. Street
Attala	James F. McCool
Attala	J. F. Allen
Benton	J. B. Blackwell
Bolivar	Whit Blanchard
Bolivar	J. S. Hicks
Calhoun	J. I. Ballinger
Calhoun	James Revis
Carroll	Monroe McClurg (1896)
Carroll	W. T. Stevens (1896)
Carroll	S. E. Turner (1897–1900)
Carroll	Lewis S. Hemphill (1897–1900)
Chickasaw	W. G. Stovall
Chickasaw	J. A. McArthur
Choctaw	R. K. Prewitt
Claiborne	Milton R. Jones
Clarke	John L. Buckley
Clay	Frank A. Critz
Clay	J. S. Goodwin
Coahoma	J. Alcorn Glover
Coahoma	F. A. Montgomery (1896)
Coahoma	W. C. Weathersby (1897–1900)
Copiah	J. G. Ainsworth
Copiah	Joel Lilly
Copiah	J. F. Sexton
Covington	A. K. Worthy
DeSoto	Mial Wall
DeSoto	Carroll Cooper (1896)
DeSoto	W. H. Rollins (1897–1900)
Franklin	R. S. Butler
Greene	John A. Smith
Grenada	William McSwine (1896–1897)
Grenada	L. M. Mays (1898–1900)
Hancock	George Arbo
Harrison	Walter A. White (1896)
Harrison	C. C. Sweatman (1897–1900)
Hinds	S. S. Champion (1896–1897)
Hinds	W. A. Montgomery (1898–1900)
Hinds	E. H. Green
Hinds	Luther Manship
Holmes	W. T. Johnson
Holmes	W. L. Keirn
Holmes	H. J. Reid
Issaquena	John W. Heath
Itawamba	W. S. Sheffield
Jackson	L. G. Manuel
Jasper	R. A. Land
Jefferson	James C. Stowers
Jones	W. A. Bryant
Kemper	I. F. Gunn
Kemper	S. C. Trammill
Lafayette	W. W. McMahon
Lafayette	Fielder Webster
Lauderdale	A. J. Russell
Lauderdale	J. D. Stennis
Lauderdale	W. R. Denton
Lawrence	P. Z. Jones (1896)
Lawrence	G. W. Johnston (1897–1900)
Leake	Asa H. Langston
Lee	H. C. Medford
Lee	O. L. Kennedy
Leflore	S. R. Coleman
Lincoln	Eli Cowart
Lowndes	M. A. Franklin
Lowndes	J. C. Neilson
Lowndes	J. B. Harrington
Madison	J. N. Lipscomb
Madison	J. B. Martin
Marion	N. C. Hathorn
Marshall	J. W. Boatwright
Marshall	John T. Brown
Marshall	R. A. Baird
Monroe	R. E. Houston
Monroe	A. J. Smith
Monroe	Frank L. Bott
Montgomery	J. P. Taylor
Neshoba	A. M. Byrd (1896)
Neshoba	O. L. Williams (1897–1900)
Newton	Thomas Keith
Newton	J. A. Leach
Noxubee	John R. Dinsmore
Noxubee	W. S. Permenter
Noxubee	DeForest Allgood
Oktibbeha	J. G. Carroll
Oktibbeha	J. W. Crumpton
Panola	J. L. Knox
Panola	S. R. Lamb
Panola	H. H. Parnell
Pearl River	J. M. Shivers
Perry	S. T. Garraway
Pike	W. W. Pope
Pike	J. B. Webb
Pontotoc	W. T. Stegall
Pontotoc	W. T. Holmes
Prentiss	W. M. Cox
Prentiss	J. T. Blanchard
Quitman	James R. Turner (1896–1897)
Quitman	M. E. Denton (1898–1900)
Rankin	Iddo Lewis
Rankin	J. Sol Roberts
Scott	W. L. Weems
Sharkey	Anthony Miller
Simpson	T. N. Touchstone
Smith	J. S. Eaton
Sunflower	P. C. Chapman
Tallahatchie	William Steele
Tate	W. J. East
Tate	T. C. House
Tippah	A. J. Richardson
Tishomingo	D. L. Ross
Tunica	Richard Abbay
Union	R. S. Bell
Union	G. L. Jones
Warren	George Anderson
Warren	J. W. Collier
Warren	Charles Ehrman
Washington	James R. Yerger
Washington	E. N. Thomas
Washington	S. M. Shankle
Wayne	F. M. Sheppard
Webster	H. H. Fox
Wilkinson	W. P. S. Ventress
Wilkinson	T. M. Whetstone
Winston	John D. Doss
Yalobusha	W. A. Herring
Yalobusha	James Moore
Yazoo	Z. P. Stutts
Yazoo	W. W. Coody
Yazoo	Fayette Caruthers
From Flotorial Districts
Claiborne and Jefferson	W. D. Torrey
Clarke and Jasper	S. F. Thigpen
Franklin and Lincoln	Edward Smith
Grenada and Montgomery	W. S. P. Doty
Harrison and Jackson	M. A. Dees
Hinds and Yazoo	Clay Sharkey
Leake and Winston	G. H. Blocker
Lee and Itawamba	A. N. Wilson (1896–1897)
Lee and Itawamba	W. D. Anderson (1898–1900)
Tippah and Benton	Allen Talbot
