= 1890–1892 Mississippi Legislature =

←	1888–1890 Mississippi Legislature	1892–1896 Mississippi Legislature	→

Overview
- Legislative body: Mississippi Legislature
- Jurisdiction: Mississippi, United States
- Meeting place: Old Mississippi State Capitol
- Term: 7 January 1890 – 5 January 1892
- Election: 1889 Mississippi elections

Mississippi State Senate
- Members: 45
- President: M. M. Evans
- President pro tempore: R. A. Dean
- Party control: Democratic

Mississippi House of Representatives
- Members: 133
- Speaker: James S. Madison
- Party control: Democratic

Sessions
- 1st: 7 January 1890 – 24 February 1890

The 1890–1892 Mississippi Legislature met between January 7, 1890, and February 24, 1890, in Jackson, Mississippi.

Elections were held on November 5, 1889.

== Senate ==
All 45 senators were Democrats. Some senators had been elected two years before and were holding over until the end of their four-year terms, while others had been just elected. M. M. Evans, as Lieutenant Governor, served ex officio as President of the Senate. R. A. Dean was chosen by acclamation to be the Senate's President Pro Tempore.

Senate
District	Name	Postoffice	Notes
1	Carroll Kendrick	Corinth	
2	W. A. McDonald	Ashland	Holding over
3	M. J. McKinney	Holly Springs	
4	C. A. Marshall	Pleasant Hill	Holding over
5	N. A. Taylor	Senatobia	Holding over
6	C. K. Caruthers	Como	
7	R. A. Dean	Glenville	Holding over
8	J. W. Lamar	Pine Valley	
9	J. W. Cutrer	Clarksdale	Holding over
10	Richard Wharton	Chesterville	
11	J. L. Turnage	Saltillo	Holding over
11	J. C. Burdine	Smithville	Holding over
12	J. C. Neilson	Columbus	Holding over
13	A. A. Montgomery	Osborn	Holding over
13	J. R. Nolen	Greensboro	
14	L. M. Southworth	Carrollton	
15	J. M. Jayne	Greenville	
16	G. A. Wilson	Lexington	Holding over
17	Presley Groves	Ofahoma	Holding over
18	W. F. Rodgers	Oak Grove	
19	G. G. Dillard	Macon	Holding over
20	J. P. Walker	Meridian	Holding over
21	A. M. Byrd	Philadelphia	
22	W. H. Hill	Sylvarena	
23	J. R. Cameron	Canton	Holding over
24	A. M. Hicks	Benton	
25	Pat Henry	Vicksburg	
26	H. L. Foote	Egremont	
27	C. M. Williamson	Jackson	Holding over
28	Stephen Thrasher	Port Gibson	
29	Alex. Fairley	Mt. Olive	Holding over
30	T. A. Wood	Quitman	Holding over
31	Horace Bloomfield	Scranton	
32	T. B. Ford	Columbia	
33	Will T. Martin	Natchez	Holding over
34	G. A. Guice	Meadville	Holding over
35	J. H. Jones	Woodville	
36	J. N. McLeod	Harrison Station	Holding over
37	A. G. Ferguson	Sandersville	
38	George S. Dodds	Hazlehurst	

== House ==
The House consisted of 129 Democrats, 3 Republicans, and 1 Independent. James S. Madison was elected Speaker of the House.

House of Representatives
County / District	Name	Postoffice
Adams	G. M. Marshall	Natchez
Adams	G. F. Bowles	Natchez
Alcorn	T. J. Graves	Corinth
Amite	Polk Talbert	Gloster
Attala	James P. Allen	Kosciusko
Attala	L. S. Terry	Sallis
Benton	B. D. Simpson	Saulsbury, Tenn.
Bolivar	O. L. Shelby	Huntington
Bolivar	L. C. Moore	Australia
Calhoun	Joseph Griffin	Sarepta
Carroll	T. W. Sullivan	Carrollton
Carroll	E. L. Conger	Blackmonton
Chickasaw	J. W. Winter	Houlka
Chickasaw	J. M. Trice	Okolona
Claiborne	E. M. Barber	Port Gibson
Choctaw	Lafayette Robinson	Ackerman
Clarke	J. B. Johnston	Shubuta
Clay	W. B. Gunn	West Point
Clay	T. W. Davidson	Montpelier
Coahoma	S. C. Cook	Clarksdale
Coahoma	G. H. Oliver	Jonestown
Copiah	J. F. Sexton	Crystal Springs
Copiah	T. J. Millsaps	Crystal Springs
Covington	C. M. Edmondson	Williamsburg
DeSoto	T. C. Dockery	Hernando
DeSoto	L. W. Williamson	Pleasant Hill
Franklin	T. A. Magee	McCall's Creek
Greene	D. W. McLeod	Leakesville
Grenada	William McSwine	Grenada
Hancock	D. B. Seal	Bay St. Louis
Harrison	W. G. Evans, Jr.	Mississipi City
Hinds	Harry Peyton	Bolton
Hinds	J. F. Fitzgerald	Cynthia
Hinds	J. A. P. Campbell Jr.	Jackson
Hinds	T. M. Griffin	Utica
Holmes	H. J. Reid	Acona
Holmes	J. L. Cotten	Pickens
Issaquena	C. J. Jones	Ben Lomond
Itawamba	William A. Hartsfield	Fulton
Jackson	J. M. Pelham	West Pascagoula
Jasper	Samuel Whitman	Enterprise
Jefferson	T. L. Darden	Fayette
Jones	A. Arrington	Ellisville
Kemper	J. T. Gewin	Rushville
Lafayette	Fielder Webster	Delay
Lafayette	J. S. Sowers	Oxford
Lauderdale	H. M. Street	Meridian
Lauderdale	W. R. Denton	Bailey
Lawrence	Archie Fairly	Silver Creek
Leake	E. D. Terry	Thomastown
Lee	James L. Gillespie	Tupelo
Lee	T. A. Boggan	Mooresville
Leflore	J. K. Vardaman	Greenwood
Lincoln	J. A. J. Hart	Bogue Chitto
Lowndes	J. H. Sharp	Penn
Lowndes	T. B. Bradford	Columbus
Lowndes	L. D. Landrum	Columbus
Madison	Robert Powell	Canton
Madison	J. R. Childress	Flora
Marion	J. M. Foxworth	Columbia
Marshall	A. M. West	Holly Springs
Marshall	Edward S. Watson	Byhalia
Marshall	J. T. Brown	Waterford
Monroe	J. T. Dilworth	Aberdeen
Monroe	R. E. Houston	Aberdeen
Monroe	T. A. Oliphant	Amory
Montgomery	J. P. Taylor	Winona
Neshoba	L. Stainton	Philadelphia
Newton	J. H. Regan	Beech Springs
Noxubee	J. H. Madison	Brooksville
Noxubee	C. M. Thomas	Shuqualak
Noxubee	T. J. O'Neil	Macon
Oktibbeha	S. O. Muldrow	Muldrow
Oktibbeha	R. P. Washington	Trim Cain
Panola	A. S. Yarbrough	Como
Panola	G. W. Harris	Eureka Springs
Panola	J. H. Jones	Courtland
Perry	A. D. Draughn	Hattiesburg
Pike	John G. Leggett	Holmesville
Pontotoc	S. H. Pitts	Cherry Creek
Prentiss	E. Alexander	Southland
Quitman	J. A. Cooper	Belen
Rankin	Patrick Henry	Brandon
Rankin	W. A. Loflin	Steens Creek
Scott	J. H. Beeman	Ely
Sharkey	G. W. Butler	Anguilla
Simpson	Barney Smith	Stovers
Smith	R. M. Currie	Burns
Sunflower	T. R. Baird	Indianola
Tallahatchie	E. D. Rowe	Harrison Station
Tate	J. R. Puryear	Thyatira
Tate	W. H. Bizzell	Strayhorn
Tippah	L. Pink Smith	Ripley
Tishomingo	S. L. Rodgers	Burnsville
Tunica	R. F. Abbay	Commerce
Union	Robert Frazier	Ellistown
Warren	L. W. Magruder	Vicksburg
Warren	T. G. Birchett	Vicksburg
Warren	J. H. Brabston	Bovina
Washington	E. N. Thomas	Greenville
Washington	John T. Casey	Hollandale
Washington	John F. Harris	Greenville
Wayne	D. M. Taylor	Waynesboro
Webster	G. W. Dudley	Walthall
Winston	J. L. H. Strait	Louisville
Wilkinson	T. V. Noland	Woodville
Wilkinson	T. A. Dickson	Centreville
Yalobusha	W. V. Moore	Oakland
Yazoo	I. M. Kelly	Satartia
Yazoo	S. S. Hudson	Yazoo City
Yazoo	C. H. Perkins	Benton
FLOATERS
Prentiss and Alcorn	W. Y. Baker	Corinth
Amite and Pike	Thomas McKnight	Liberty
Benton and Tippah	Allen Talbot	Ashland
Holmes and Yazoo	W. J. Watlington	Deasonville
Kemper, Lauderdale and Clarke	W. D. Witherspoon	Meridian
Newton and Leake	U. S. Roberts	Palona
Lincoln and Jefferson	R. B. Applewhite	Brookhaven
Yalobusha and Calhoun	L. T. Blount	Water Valley
Pontotoc and Union	Jeff D. Potter	Cherry Creek
