= Captain (United States) =

General category of United States military rank

Captain (O-6)
- Insignia of the naval rank of captain
- Country: United States
- Service branch: United States Navy; United States Coast Guard; United States Public Health Service Commissioned Corps; NOAA Commissioned Officer Corps; US Maritime Service
- Abbreviation: CAPT
- Rank group: Senior officer
- NATO rank code: OF-5
- Pay grade: O-6
- Next higher rank: Rear admiral (lower half)
- Next lower rank: Commander
- Equivalent ranks: Colonel

Captain (O-3)
- Insignia of the USA, USAF, and USSF rank of captain

- Insignia of the USMC rank of captain
- Country: United States
- Service branch: United States Army; United States Air Force; United States Marine Corps; United States Space Force
- Abbreviation: CPT (USA); Capt. (USAF/USSF); Capt, Capt., or CAPT (USMC)
- Rank group: Junior or company-grade officer
- NATO rank code: OF-2
- Pay grade: O-3
- Next higher rank: Major
- Next lower rank: First lieutenant
- Equivalent ranks: Lieutenant (USN, USCG, USPHSCC, NOAA Corps, US Maritime Service)

In the uniformed services of the United States, captain is a commissioned-officer rank. In keeping with the traditions of the militaries of most nations, the rank varies between the services, being a senior rank in the naval services (O-6) and a junior rank in the ground and air forces (O-3). Many fire departments and police departments in the United States also use the rank of captain as an officer in a specific unit.

== Usage ==
For the naval rank, a captain is a senior officer of U.S. uniformed services pay grades O-6 (the sixth officer rank), typically commanding seagoing vessels, major aviation commands and shore installations. This rank is used by the U.S. Navy, U.S. Coast Guard, U.S. Public Health Service Commissioned Corps, the National Oceanic and Atmospheric Administration Commissioned Corps, and the U.S. Maritime Service.

Seaborne services of the United States and many other nations refer to the officer in charge of any seagoing vessel as "captain" regardless of actual rank. For instance, in the civilian United States Merchant Marine, the commander of a vessel is also referred to as a captain, and everyone in his boat must abide by his commands. While not an official rank, as in military pay grade, it is an official title. One exception to the rule is when an officer of higher rank than captain, such as admiral, is the officer in charge of one or more seagoing vessel(s), such as a carrier battle group. An admiral is never referred to as "captain". In the seaborne services, especially for submarine and aviation commands, the commanding officer is often referred to informally as "skipper" whether the officer is a captain or below.

For the ground and air forces rank, a captain is of pay grade O-3 (the third officer rank), usually serving as the commander of a company-sized unit in the ground forces, as a flight leader or other squadron officer in air units, or serving as an executive officer or staff officer for a larger unit such as a battalion or squadron. This rank is used by the U.S. Army, U.S. Air Force, and U.S. Marine Corps.

The rank of captain is also used in other organizations outside the military, particularly in fire departments, police, and law enforcement.

U.S. Air Force (Note: The U.S. Marine Corps insignia for captain is slightly different from the USA / USAF insignia depicted above in that it lacks beveled edges and the cross-bars are further towards the ends. See collar insignia for U.S. Navy lieutenant.)

U.S. Army (dress, garrison)

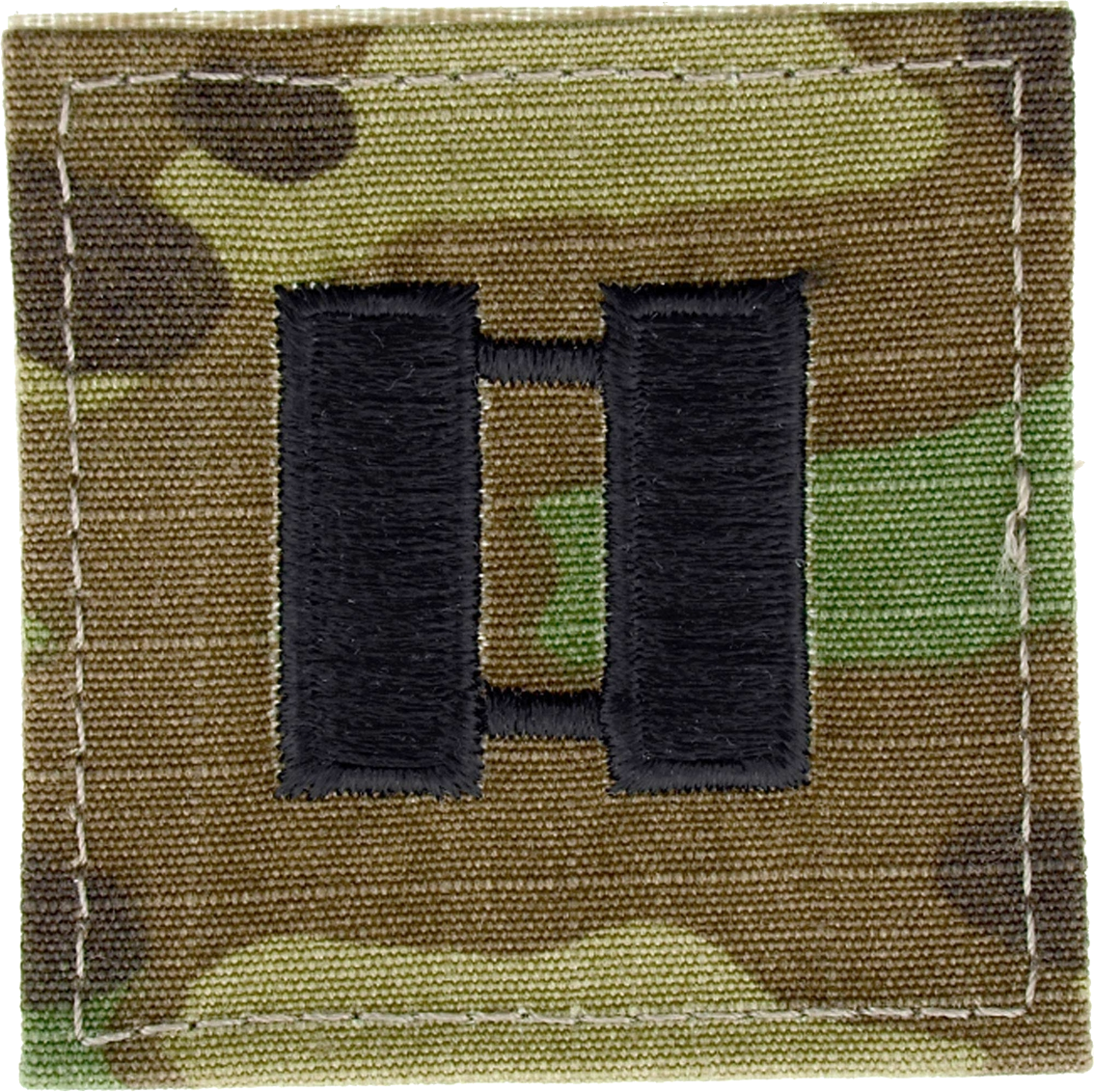
U.S. Army (field, combat)

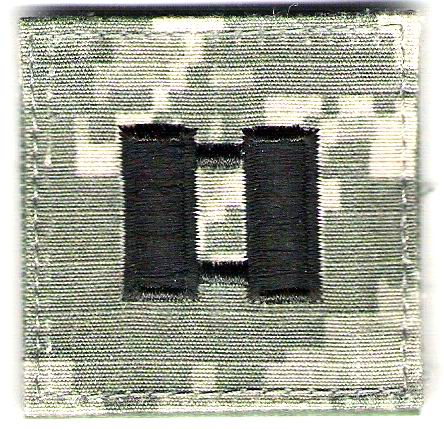
U.S. Army (field, combat)

U.S. Marine Corps (dress, garrison)

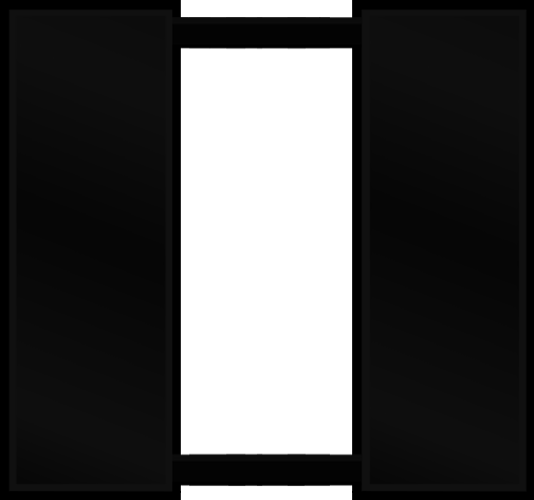
U.S. Marine Corps (field, combat)

== Captain (naval rank) ==
USN, USCG, USPHSCC, and NOAACOC collar, cover (hat), or shoulder rank insignia (on select uniforms)

The eagle, shoulder boards, and dress blue sleeve stripes of a U.S. Navy captain
(Line officer)

The eagle, shoulder boards, and dress blue sleeve stripes of a U.S. Coast Guard captain

The eagle, shoulder boards, and sleeve stripes (dress blues + female dress whites) of a USPHS captain

The eagle, shoulder boards, and sleeve stripes (dress blues + female dress whites) of a NOAA Corps captain

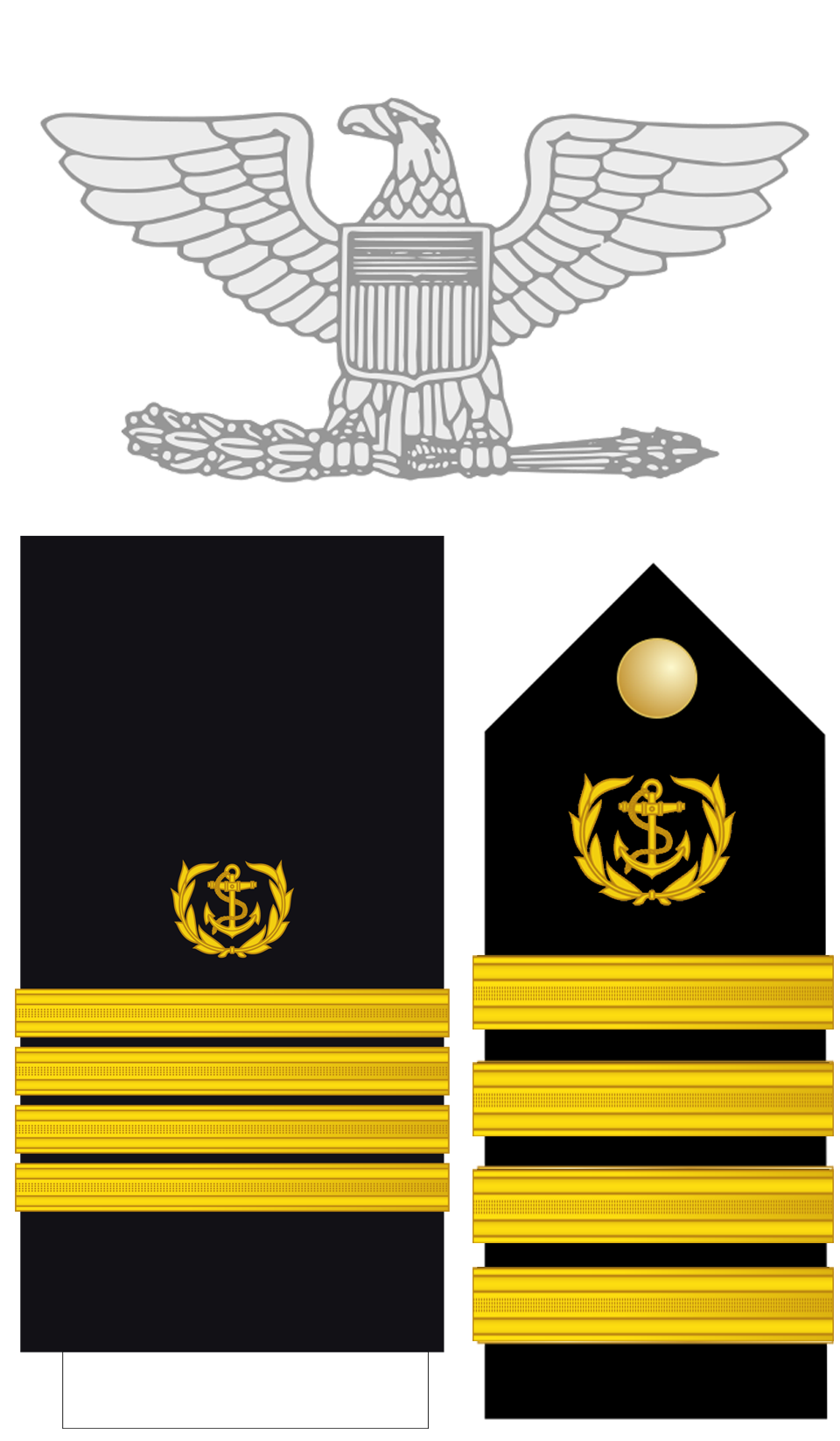
The eagle, shoulder boards, and sleeve stripes (dress blues) of a USMS captain

== Captain (ground, air, and space forces) ==
The insignia for captains in the United States Army was first authorized in 1836. During the American Civil War, the rank of captain was used in both the Union Army and Confederate States Army. The rank was typically held by either junior staff officers or company commanders. In the case of the latter, company officers were normally elected by the men of their unit, unless the officer in question held rank in the Regular Army. In cases where regiments had suffered high casualties, it was not uncommon for a captain to assume duties as the regimental commander. Such was the case in the 1st Mississippi Infantry which was commanded by Captain Owen Hughes after the regiment had lost over half its number at the Battle of Nashville.

U.S. Army (September 1959 to October 2015)

U.S. Army (1861 to 1865)

== Rank equivalency between services ==
Because of the ambiguity created by the common use of "captain" for officers of different grades among the Air Force, Army, Coast Guard, Marine Corps, Navy, NOAA, Public Health Service, and Space Force, equivalency is conferred between officers by use of identical pay grade rather than title of rank. The higher the grade, the higher the rank of the officer. For example, an Army, Air Force, Marine, or Space Force captain (O-3) is equivalent in rank, responsibilities, and grade to a Navy, Public Health Service, NOAA, or Coast Guard lieutenant (O-3). Similarly, a Navy, Public Health Service, NOAA, or Coast Guard captain (O-6) is equivalent in rank, responsibilities, and grade to an Army, Air Force, Marine, or Space Force colonel (O-6). Thus, Army, Air Force, Marine, and Space Force colonels together with Navy, Public Health Service, NOAA, and Coast Guard captains wear the silver eagle insignia of the grade of O-6, while Army, Air Force, Marine, and Space Force captains together with Navy, Public Health Service, and Coast Guard lieutenants wear the double silver bars of the rank insignia of the grade of O-3. Additionally, the O-6 rank of Navy, Public Health Service, NOAA, and Coast Guard captain is abbreviated as uppercase "CAPT", while the O-3 rank of captain is abbreviated as "CPT" for the Army and mixed-case "Capt" for the Air Force, Marine Corps, and Space Force.

== Early history ==
In the United States, the rank of captain first appeared in the Continental Army during the Revolutionary War. A captain was the officer placed in charge of a company of soldiers and was granted a commission from the regimental colonel. A captain was afforded one to several lieutenants, depending on the size of the company, and the captain's commission could be revoked or expired at the end of a particular military campaign.

The Continental Navy used the rank of captain as the commander of a sailing vessel at war, with the captain having several lieutenants on board, as well as a sailing master to assist in their duties. This use of the rank carried over into the U.S. Navy. Captain was the highest naval rank from 1775 until 1857, when the United States Congress created the rank of flag officer. With the addition of the ranks of commander and lieutenant commander between lieutenant and captain, a Navy captain became equivalent in rank to an Army colonel.

== See also ==
- Naval captain
