= George Bowles =

George Bowles may refer to:

- Sir George Bowles (British Army officer) (1787–1876), British general
- George A. Bowles (1883–1956), American politician, member of the Virginia House of Delegates
- George F. Bowles (c. 1844–1899), American lawyer and state legislator who lived in Natchez, Mississippi
- George Bowles (Conservative politician) (1877–1955), Conservative Party Member of Parliament for Norwood, 1906–1910
- Frank Bowles, Baron Bowles (Francis George Bowles, 1902–1970), British solicitor and politician
- George Rushout-Bowles, father of George Rushout, 3rd Baron Northwick
