= J. D. Doss =

American politician

Member of the Mississippi State Senate from the 15th district
- In office January 5, 1904 – January 7, 1908
- Preceded by: James R. Key
- Succeeded by: James R. Key

Member of the Mississippi House of Representatives from the Winston County district
- In office January 5, 1892 – January 5, 1904
- Preceded by: J. L. H. Strait
- Succeeded by: W. C. Hight

Personal details
- Born: August 29, 1861 Webster, Mississippi, U. S.
- Died: April 14, 1927 (aged 65) Memphis, Tennessee, U. S.
- Party: Democratic

John David Doss (August 29, 1861 – April 14, 1927) was an American politician. He represented the 15th District in the Mississippi State Senate from 1904 to 1908, and represented Winston County in the Mississippi House of Representatives from 1892 to 1904.

== Early life ==
John David Doss was born on August 30, 1861, near Webster, Mississippi. He was the son of John Carroll Doss, a Confederate lieutenant of English descent, and Elizabeth Glenn (Mitts) Doss, of Dutch descent. John attended Webster's public schools. He then attended the Starkville Academy. Doss attended Mississippi Agricultural & Mechanical Culture in 1882 and did not graduate.

== Career ==
Doss taught schools in Mississippi for ten years, and then Texas for two years. He then served on Winston County's Board of Examiners from 1888 to 1892. On November 3, 1891, Doss was elected to represent Winston County in the Mississippi House of Representatives as a Democrat for the 1892-1896 term. On November 7, 1895, Doss was re-elected for the 1896-1900 term. He was re-elected again on November 7, 1899, for the 1900-1904 term. On November 3, 1903, Doss was elected to represent the 15th District (Kemper and Winston Counties) in the Senate for the 1904-1908 term. During this term, Doss served on the following committees: Finance; Agriculture; Commerce & Manufactures; Education; and Banks & Banking. After his Senate term ended, he worked as a bank director in Grenada, Mississippi. He also owned a plantation in Winston County. He moved to Memphis, Tennessee, in 1922. Doss died after injuries from a fall at home on April 14, 1927, in Memphis, Tennessee.

== Personal life ==
Doss was a Baptist. He was a member of the Freemasons and Woodmen of the World. He married Willie Ann Thompson Coleman on January 29, 1891. They had six children in 1904: John Grady, Beatrice Isabella, Carl Manard, Beryl Willie, Daniel Williams, Chaucer DeFoe, and Algernon Sydney. By 1927, they had eight living children: five daughters and three sons.
