= Reuben Kendrick =

Mississippi politician

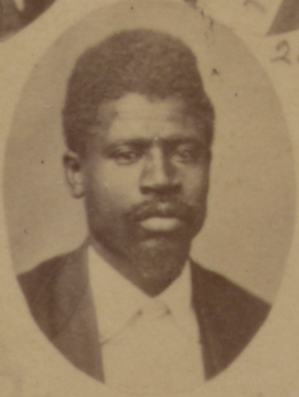
Photograph of Reuben Kendrick (1874)

Reuben Kendrick was a constable and state representative in Mississippi. He was born into slavery in Louisiana. He was appointed constable in Amite County, Mississippi in 1869 by Governor Adelbert Ames. He was elected to a seat in the Mississippi House of Representatives in 1871 and served from 1872 to 1875. He represented Amite County. He and other Mississippi state legislators were photographed in 1874 by E. von Seutter.

In 1876 he wrote the governor about being denied his right to vote.

== See also ==
- Reconstruction era
- Mississippi Plan
- African American officeholders from the end of the Civil War until before 1900

== Works cited ==
- Work, Monroe N. (January 1920). "Some Negro Members of Reconstruction Conventions and Legislatures and of Congress". The Journal of Negro History. V (1): 63–111. doi:10.2307/2713503. JSTOR 2713503. S2CID 149610698.
