= Senator Bloomfield =

Senator Bloomfield may refer to:

- Allen J. Bloomfield (1883–1932), New York State Senate
- Dave Bloomfield (born 1946), Nebraska State Senate
- Horace Bloomfield (politician) (1855–1944), Mississippi State Senate
