= Senator Dillard =

Senator Dillard may refer to:

- G. G. Dillard (1839–1921), Mississippi State Senate
- Kirk Dillard (born 1955), Illinois State Senate
