= George William Butler =

American politician

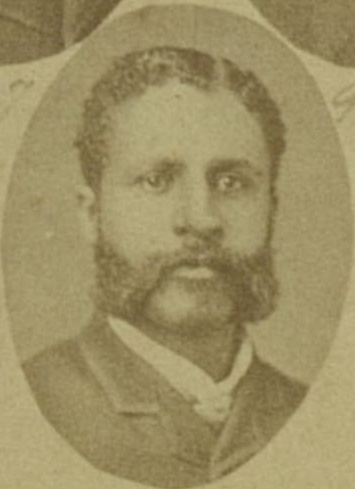

Member of the Mississippi House of Representatives
- In office 1884–1894

Personal details
- Born: May 1, 1855 Port Gibson, Mississippi, U.S.
- Party: Republican
- Profession: Politician

George William Butler was an American state legislator in Mississippi. He represented Sharkey County, Mississippi in the Mississippi House of Representatives from 1884 to 1894.

In 1884 he served on the Committee of Engrossed Bills.

In 1890, he was described as one of six Republicans in the Mississippi House. He and G. W. Gayles were the last two African Americans to serve in the Mississippi House for the next 74 years when Robert G. Clark Jr. served.

== See also ==
- African American officeholders from the end of the Civil War until before 1900
