= Robert Aaron Dean =

American politician and farmer

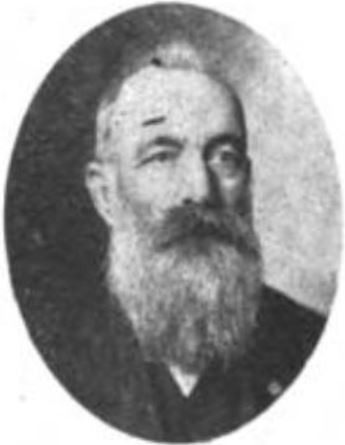
- c. 1908

President pro tempore of the Mississippi State Senate
- In office January 7, 1890 – January 7, 1896
- Preceded by: J. P. Walker
- Succeeded by: James T. Harrison

Member of the Mississippi State Senate from the 32nd district 7th (1886–1896)
- In office January 1908 – January 1912
- Preceded by: George R. Hightower
- Succeeded by: Lee M. Russell
- In office January 5, 1886 – January 7, 1896
- Succeeded by: W. F. Love

Member of the Mississippi House of Representatives from the Lafayette County district
- In office January 1878 – January 1880

Personal details
- Born: December 29, 1836 Marshall County, Mississippi, U.S.
- Died: November 19, 1912 (aged 75) Glenville, Mississippi, U.S.
- Party: Democratic Party
- Children: 8

Robert Aaron Dean (December 29, 1836 – November 19, 1912) was an American politician and farmer. He served in both houses of the Mississippi Legislature, and was the President Pro Tempore of the Mississippi State Senate from 1890 to 1896. He represented Lafayette County.

== Early life ==
Robert Aaron Dean was born on December 29, 1836, near Chulahoma, Mississippi. He was the son of Russell Dean, who was of English and Scottish descent; and his wife Louisa Ann (Alsup) Dean, who was of Welsh and Irish descent. Dean attended the private schools of his native Marshall County, Mississippi, and became a farmer.

When the American Civil War began in 1861, Dean enlisted in the 19th Mississippi Infantry Regiment as an Orderly Sergeant, and by 1863 was promoted to Major, at which rank he served until the end of the war.

== Political career ==
In 1877, Dean was elected to represent Lafayette County as a Democrat in the Mississippi House of Representatives for the 1878–1880 session, and entered office on January 8, 1878. Dean then represented the 7th District (Lafayette County) in the Mississippi State Senate from 1886 to 1896. In 1890, Dean was elected by acclamation to the position of the senate's President pro tempore. He was a delegate at the 1890 Mississippi Constitutional Convention and chaired the penitentiary committee that banned convict leasing. In 1892, Dean was re-elected to the presidency pro tempore, defeating Senator John M. Simonton with a vote of 30 to 12. His tenure as president pro tempore continued through the 1894 session. In 1896 Dean was succeeded in the Senate by W. F. Love. From 1900 to 1903, Dean was part of the Commission that supervised the construction of the new Mississippi State Capitol building. On January 25, 1908, Dean was elected to replace George W. Hightower, who resigned, to represent the 32nd District (also Lafayette County) in the State Senate. He was succeeded in the state senate by Lee M. Russell.

== Later life ==
Dean died near Glenville, Mississippi, on November 19, 1912.

== Personal life ==
Dean was a Democrat, a Baptist, and a Mason. He married Lucy Ann Langston on February 2, 1864, and they had eight children together, all of whom were living as of 1908. Their names were Russell Langston, Thomas Greenwood, Joseph James, Robert Aaron Jr., Louanner, Georgia, Minnie, and Hardy Mott.
