= A. M. Hicks =

Former American politician

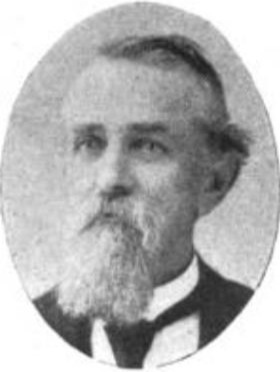
- c. 1904

Member of the Mississippi State Senate from the 19th (1892-1908) district 24th (1890-1892)
- In office January 7, 1890 – January 7, 1908
- Succeeded by: F. G. Barry

Member of the Mississippi House of Representatives from the Yazoo County district
- In office January 1876 – January 1882

Personal details
- Born: June 5, 1835 Maury County, Tennessee, U. S.
- Died: December 22, 1915 (aged 80) Bentonia, Mississippi
- Party: Democratic

Allen M. Hicks (June 5, 1835 - December 22, 1915) was an American politician and planter. He represented the Yazoo County in the Mississippi State Senate from 1890 to 1908, and in the Mississippi House of Representatives from 1876 to 1882.

== Early life ==
Allen M. Hicks was born on June 5, 1835, in Maury County, Tennessee. He was the son of George Hicks (died 1848), a Methodist minister and Mississippi state senator of English descent, and Julia Adelaide (Gant) Hicks (died 1853), of Scottish descent. Hicks attended the Classical Hall school in Yazoo City. He then entered the University of Mississippi, as a member of the Class of 1854, but left during his junior year due to poor health. In 1854, Hicks became a planter in Yazoo County.

== Career ==
Hicks enlisted in the Confederate Army. He was discharged due to bad health. He then served as a volunteer in General William Wing Loring's commissary department for two years.

=== 1875-1890 ===
In 1875, Hicks was elected to the Mississippi House of Representatives, representing Yazoo County as a Democrat, for the 1876-1878 term. He was reelected in 1877 for the 1878-1880 term. He was re-elected once again in 1879 for the 1880-1882 term. In 1882, Hicks was appointed Superintendent of Education for Yazoo County. He resigned from this position in 1890.

=== 1890-1908 ===
In 1889, Hicks was elected to the Mississippi State Senate, representing the 24th District, for the 1890-1892 term. On November 24, 1891, Hicks was re-elected, this time representing the 19th District (Yazoo County), for the 1892-1896 term. In 1895, Hicks was re-elected for the 1896-1900 term. During this term, Hicks chaired the Public Education committee, and served on the Universities & Colleges committee as well. On November 7, 1899, Hicks was re-elected to the Senate for the 1900-1904 term. During this term, Hicks chaired the Public Education Committee, and also served on the Military committee. Hicks was re-elected to the Senate in 1903 for the 1904-1908 term. During this term, he chaired the Public Education committee, and served on the following other committees: Humane & Benevolent Institutions; Levees; Engrossed Bills; and Temperance.

== Personal life ==
Hicks was a member of the Methodist Episcopal Church, South. He joined the Freemasons in 1859. He held several roles of leadership in the Freemasons in his Myrleville chapter and beyond: he was Deputy Grand Master in 1879, Grand Junior Warden in 1884, and a Grand Lecturer of Mississippi from 1895 to his death. Hicks married Martha Potress Bostick on October 29, 1861, in Canton, Mississippi. Martha's maternal grandfather was an uncle of John Bell. Allen and Martha had four children: Julia, Lillabell, Mattie, and Allen G.

Hicks died on December 22, 1915, at his home near Bentonia, Mississippi.
