= Columbus W. Walley =

Democratic senator from Mississippi

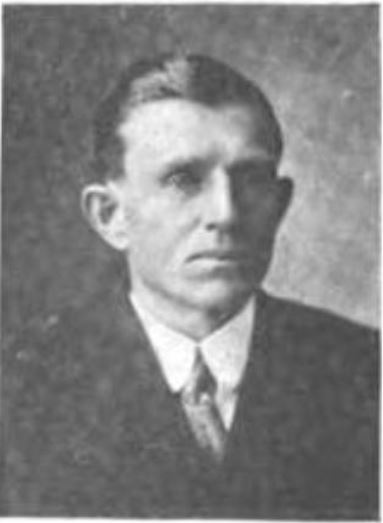
- c. 1917

Member of the Mississippi Senate from the 2nd district
- In office January 1916 – January 1920

Personal details
- Born: February 7, 1876 Richton, Mississippi
- Died: January 24, 1936 (aged 59)
- Party: Democratic
- Children: 4

Columbus Wesley Walley (February 7, 1876 - January 24, 1936) was a Democratic Mississippi state senator, representing the state's 2nd senatorial district from 1916 to 1920.

== Biography ==
Columbus Welsey Walley was born on February 7, 1876, near Richton in Greene County, Mississippi. He was the son of John Walley and Sarah Ann (Henderson) Walley. Walley attended the public schools of Greene County and the high schools of Leakesville and Waynesboro. He then attended Mississippi Agricultural & Mechanical College (now known as Mississippi State University). From 1914 to 1916, he was the Superintendent of Education of Wayne County. In 1915, he was elected to represent the 2nd district as a Democrat in the Mississippi State Senate for the 1916–1920 term. He also became a County Supervisor of Wayne County. He died on January 24, 1936, and was buried in Mt. Zion Cemetery in Greene County, Mississippi.

== Personal life ==
Walley was a minister of the Methodist Church. He was also a Freemason. He married Eleanor Almeada Smith, the daughter of John A. Smith, a member of the Mississippi House of Representatives from 1896 to 1904. Walley and Eleanor had four children: Dwight Luther, Andrew, Denton, and Aubrey Columbus (1917–2003).
