= Mississippi City, Mississippi =

- Unincorporated community
- Location within the state of Mississippi
- Coordinates: 30.38186°N 89.04392°W
- Country: United States
- State: Mississippi
- County: Harrison
- Elevation: 20 ft (6.1 m)
- Time zone: UTC-6 (Central (CST))
  - Summer (DST): UTC-5 (CDT)
- GNIS feature ID: 673696

Mississippi City is an unincorporated community in Harrison County, Mississippi, United States. It is part of the Gulfport–Biloxi, Mississippi Metropolitan Statistical Area. The community was annexed by Gulfport, Mississippi in 1965.

== History ==
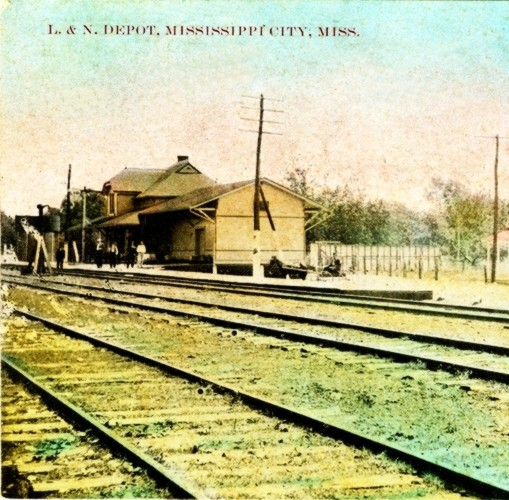
Louisville and Nashville Railroad Depot, circa 1910.

As the original county seat for Harrison County, Mississippi City was one of the most important towns on the Mississippi Gulf Coast in the latter half of the 19th century. In 1869 and 1870, the Louisville and Nashville Railroad (L&NRR) was constructed through the southernmost section of Harrison County, connecting New Orleans, Louisiana, and Mobile, Alabama. Mississippi City was situated on the L&NRR, approximately 71 miles (114 km) east of New Orleans. In 1900, the population of Mississippi City was 534 and increased to 800 by 1906. At that time, the town had both public and private schools, a courthouse, post office, hotels, and several churches. Because of the mild climate, the town's beach location on the Mississippi Sound attracted visitors throughout the year. Mississippi City served as the county seat of Harrison County from 1841 to 1902.

In 1841, the Mississippi Legislature deliberated over prospective sites for a state university. Numerous Mississippi towns were considered, but in the final ballots, only Mississippi City and Oxford remained in contention. On January 21, 1841, the lawmakers selected Oxford over Mississippi City by a vote of 58 to 57 as the location for the University of Mississippi.

On February 7, 1882, in front of the Barnes Hotel (aka Gulf View Hotel), at Mississippi City, John L. Sullivan knocked out Patrick ‘Paddy' Ryan in the ninth round of a bareknuckle fight for the heavyweight championship. Built entirely of hand-hewn pine lumber, the two-story Barnes Hotel was constructed before the American Civil War. At the time of the Sullivan – Ryan fight, it was described as the largest and oldest hotel on the Mississippi Gulf Coast and catered to planters, steamboat operators, merchants, and gamblers. In August 1898, the Barnes Hotel was completely destroyed by fire of unknown origin.

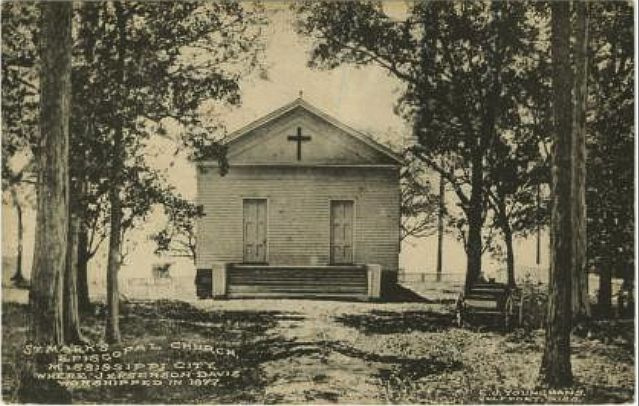
St. Mark's Episcopal Church, Miss. City

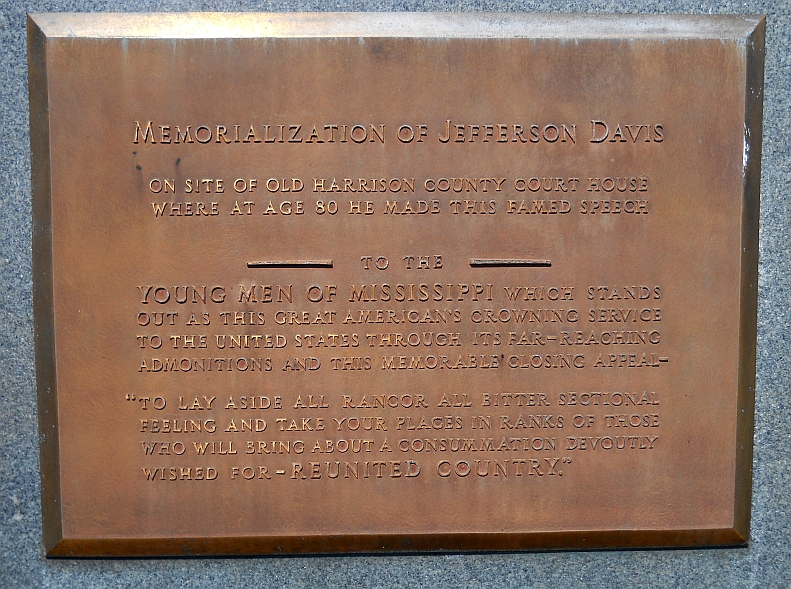
Jefferson Davis Speech

In 1877, Jefferson Davis, former president of the Confederate States of America, moved to Beauvoir Plantation in Biloxi and remained there until his death in 1889. During those years, Davis became a member of St. Mark's Episcopal Church, which was located in Mississippi City, and served on the church Vestry. In March 1888, at the courthouse in Mississippi City, Davis gave a speech pleading for unity of all U.S. citizens after the American Civil War.

Before the 20th century, Mississippi City had a colorful history as the site of courtroom gunfights, political debates, saloon brawls, and mule races.

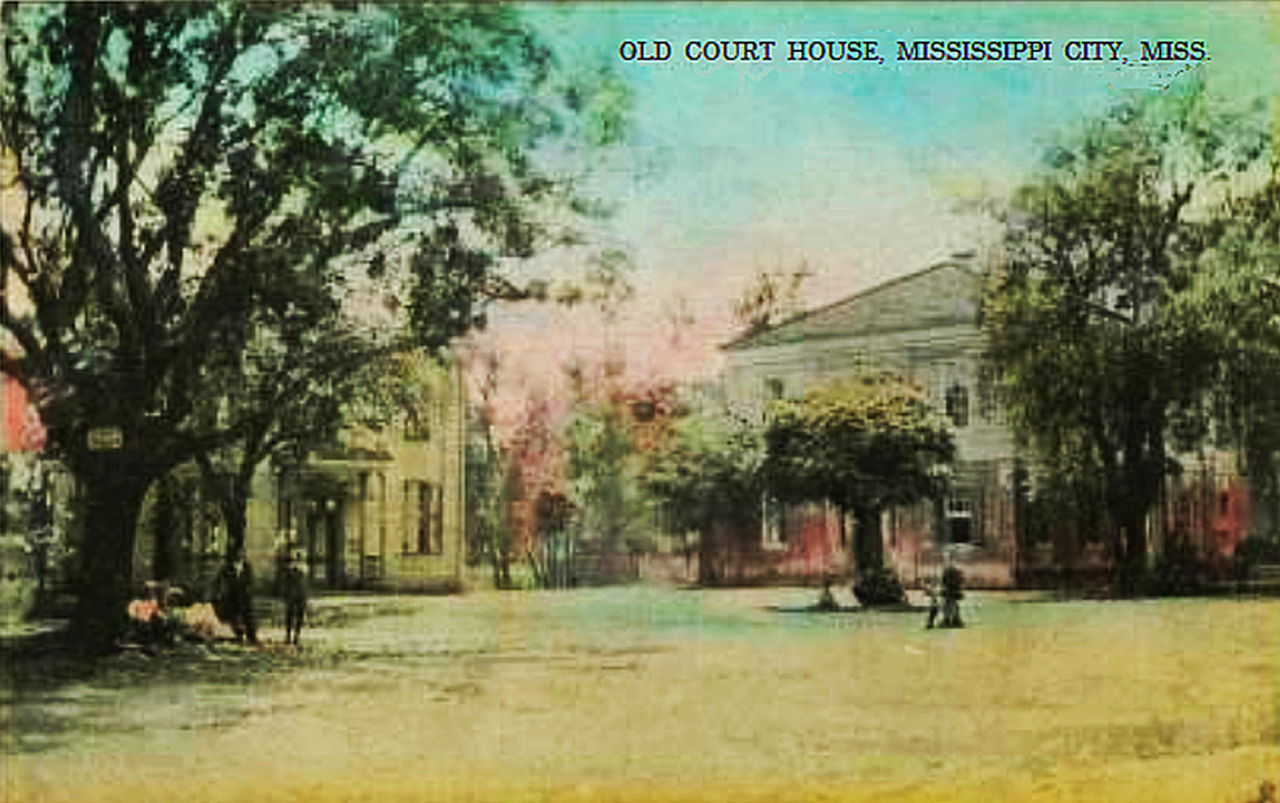
Courthouse complex circa 1900

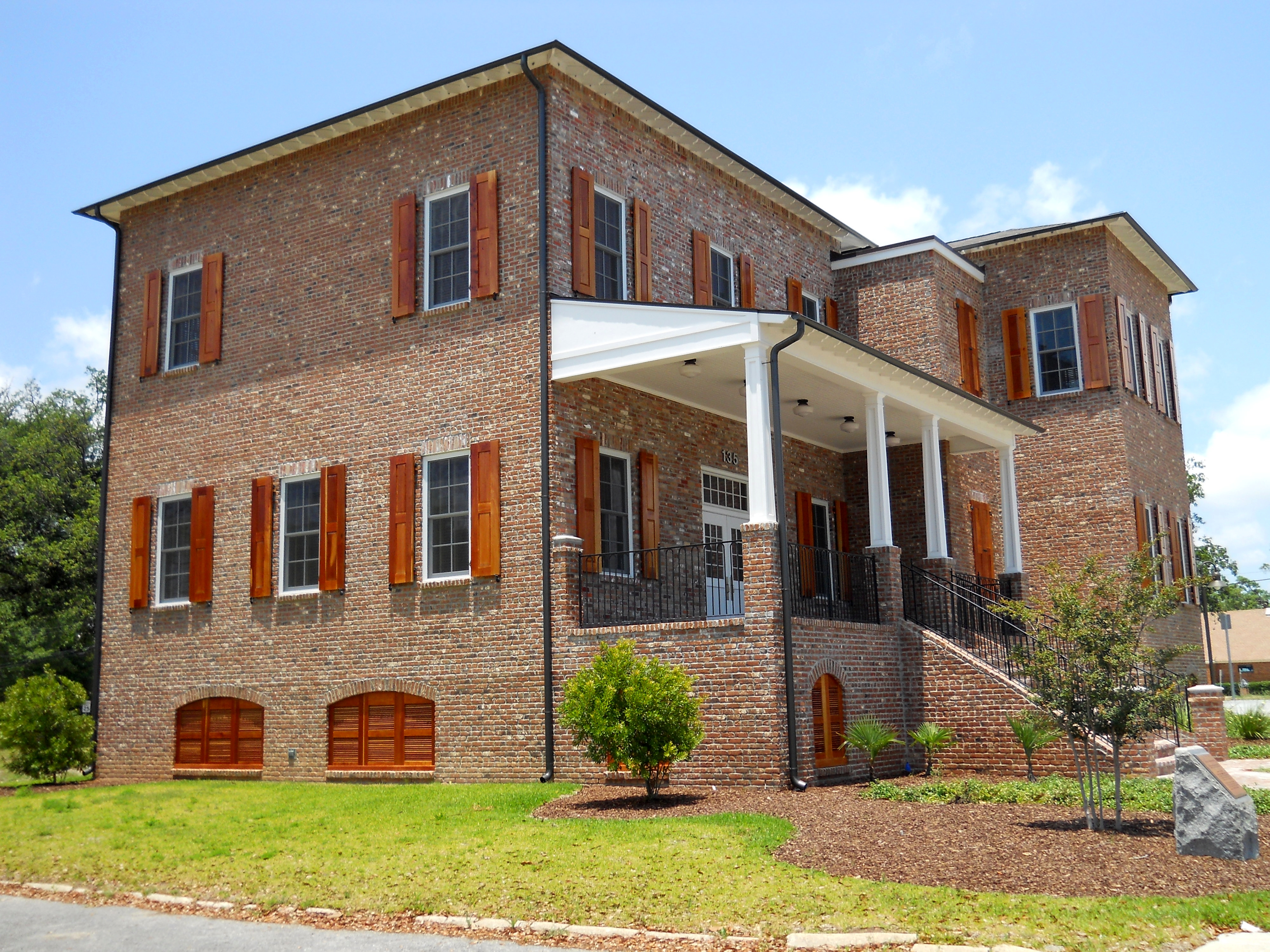
Re-creation of the Mississippi City Grand Jury Courthouse, 2011

Harry G. Gibson (1870–1898), a native of Indiana, was indicted on January 17, 1898, by a grand jury of the Circuit Court of Harrison County, Mississippi. On July 16, 1898, Gibson was hanged at Mississippi City for the murder of John S. Parkhurst (1827–1897) and Caroline Boardman Parkhurst (1832–1897). He was the first person legally executed for a crime in Harrison County.

Although Mississippi City experienced an extraordinary history, financial problems and politics prevented the community from achieving city status. The community lost its independent identity in 1965 when it was annexed by the city of Gulfport.

In the early 1890s, the Harrison County Courthouse was located in a complex at Mississippi City along with other courthouse buildings. The last remaining of these buildings had served as a grand jury room and clerks' offices, but it was destroyed in 2005 by Hurricane Katrina. In the aftermath of the hurricane, government officials committed to construct a period-style re-creation of the old grand jury courthouse, along with historical modifications, to serve as a visible reminder of historic buildings on the Mississippi Gulf Coast.

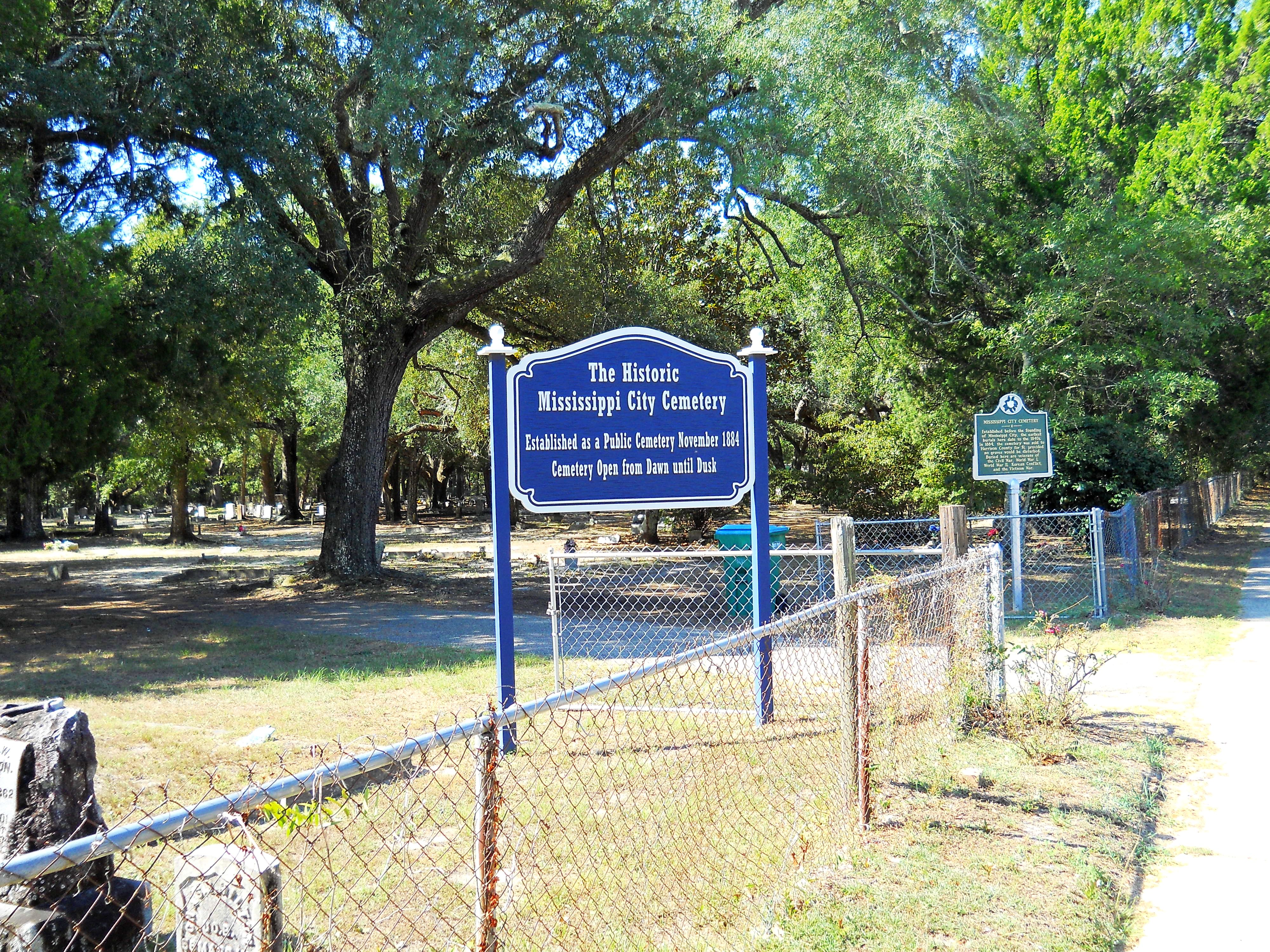
Mississippi City Cemetery

=== Mississippi City cemetery ===
Mississippi City cemetery is located at 232, 321/2 Street (30°23′23″N 89°03′09″W) in Gulfport. As of 2016, there were about 880 graves in the cemetery, with the earliest burials dating from the 1840s. Notable interments include Blind Roosevelt Graves (1909–1962) and Confederate veterans from the American Civil War. In August 2016, the cemetery was being considered for a scene in a made-for-TV movie – A Deadly Affair.

In September 2024, a group of students from the University of Southern Mississippi and students from Pass Road Elementary worked together to clean up the cemetery and make gravestones readable.

== Notable people ==
- Milt Bolling, Major League Baseball shortstop
- Wesley G. Evans, member of the Mississippi House of Representatives from 1890 to 1892 and the Mississippi Senate from 1900 to 1904
- T. A. Wood, member of the Mississippi Senate from 1896 to 1897 and from 1888 to 1892
