= Truman Gray =

American Democratic politician and educator

Member of the Mississippi State Senate from the 2nd district
- In office January 7, 1896 – January 1900
- Preceded by: N. C. Hill
- Succeeded by: Francis M. Sheppard

Personal details
- Born: April 5, 1854 Wayne County, Mississippi, U.S.
- Died: January 12, 1940 (aged 85) Wayne County, Mississippi, U.S.
- Party: Democratic

Truman Gray (April 5, 1854 - January 12, 1940) was an American Democratic politician and educator. He represented the 2nd District of the Mississippi State Senate between 1896 and 1900. He was also the Superintendent of Education for Wayne County, Mississippi, from 1886 to 1892.

== Biography ==
Truman Gray was born on April 5, 1854, in Wayne County, Mississippi, the son of Major John L. Gray (died 1900) and Caroline (Salter) Gray. He was a brother of Baron De Kalb Gray, a clergyman (born 1855). His other siblings included Mollie, Walter (died 1931), Ed, Asa M., and C. H. Truman attended the public schools of his area and then Mississippi College. He then worked as an educator. merchant and a planter, and lived in Boyce, Mississippi.

On July 6, 1886, he was appointed to the position superintendent of public education for Wayne County, replacing the deceased J. H. Mallard. His term as Superintendent ended in January 1892, after which he was replaced by W. E. Lloyd.

In 1895, Gray won the Democratic primary and was then elected to represent the 2nd District in the Mississippi State Senate for the 1896 and 1898 sessions. During these sessions, Gray was the member of the following committees: Agricultural Commerce; Public Education; Registration and Elections; Penitentiary and Prisons; and Public Lands. In 1900, Gray was succeeded in the Senate by Francis M. Sheppard. Gray died at his family residence on January 12, 1940.
