= D. W. Heidelberg =

American lawyer and politician

Member of the Mississippi State Senate from the 3rd district
- In office January 5, 1904 – January 1908
- Preceded by: B. W. Sharbrough
- Succeeded by: Sam Whitman Jr.
- In office January 4, 1898 – January 2, 1900
- Preceded by: T. A. Wood
- Succeeded by: B. W. Sharbrough

Personal details
- Born: July 29, 1858 Clarke County, Mississippi, U. S.
- Died: February 1, 1941 (aged 82) Shubuta, Mississippi, U. S.
- Party: Democratic
- Children: 2

Daniel Webster Heidelberg (July 29, 1858 - February 1, 1941) was an American lawyer and politician. He served in the Mississippi State Senate from 1897 to 1900 and from 1904 to 1908.

== Biography ==
Daniel Webster Heidelberg was born in Clarke County, Mississippi, on July 29, 1858. He was the son of Samuel Christian Heidelberg and Martha (Granberry) Heidelberg. Daniel attended the primary schools of Clarke and Jasper Counties. He studied at Cooper's Institute in Lauderdale County, Mississippi, receiving a Ph. B. in 1879. He was admitted to the Mississippi bar in 1881. In 1888, he wrote a digest on Mississippi history. In 1897, Heidelberg was elected to replace the resigning T. A. Wood to represent the 3rd District in the Mississippi State Senate for the remainder of the 1896-1900 session, and was inaugurated in January 1898. On August 27, 1903, Heidelberg won the Democratic nomination to be re-elected to the Senate. He won the general election on November 3, 1903, and served the full term from 1904 to 1908. During this term, Heidelberg served on the following committees: Judiciary; Constitution; Federal Relations; Contingent Expenses; Penitentiary and Prisons; and Temperance. After leaving office, Heidelberg continued practicing law with the Heidelberg & Johnston law firm in Shubuta, Mississippi. He served as vice president of the Mississippi Bar Association. Later in life, he travelled and he was in Belgium during the beginning of World War I. He died at his home in Shubuta on February 1, 1941.

== Personal life ==
Heidelberg was a member of the Methodist Episcopal Church, South. He married Theodora Kitty Dees on January 1, 1882, in Shubuta. They had two sons, named Harvey Brown, and Rowland Webster.
