= John A. Smith (Mississippi politician) =

American politician

Member of the Mississippi House of Representatives from the Greene County district
- In office January 1896 – January 1904

Personal details
- Born: January 13, 1847 Mississippi
- Died: May 15, 1910 (aged 63)
- Party: Democrat

John Andrew Smith (January 13, 1847 - May 15, 1910) was a Democratic member of the Mississippi House of Representatives, representing Greene County, from 1896 to 1904.

== Biography ==
John Andrew Smith was born on January 13, 1847, in Mississippi. He served as the county supervisor of Greene County, Mississippi, for 3 terms. Smith first represented Greene County as a Democrat in the Mississippi House of Representatives for the 1896–1900 term. He served again for the 1900–1904 term. He died on May 15, 1910, and was buried in Mutual Rights Cemetery in Greene County.

== Personal life ==
Smith was a Methodist. He married Spicy Kittrell. Their daughter, Eleanor Almeada, was married to Columbus W. Walley, a Mississippi state senator from 1916 to 1920.
