= 1st Mississippi Infantry Regiment =

Infantry regiment of the Confederate States Army

- Active: 1861–1865
- Country: Confederate States
- Allegiance: Mississippi
- Branch: Army
- Role: Infantry
- Size: Regiment
- Facings: Light blue
- Engagements: American Civil War: Battle of Fort Donelson; Siege of Port Hudson; Battle of Tupelo; Battle of Franklin; Battle of Nashville

Commanders
- Notable commanders: Col. Thomas H. Johnston; Col. John M. Simonton; Capt. Owen D. Hughes

The 1st Mississippi Infantry Regiment (Simonton's/Johnston's) was a line infantry regiment of the Confederate States Army formed from companies in north Mississippi. The regiment was first organized in the summer and late fall of 1861. The unit fought primarily in the western theater of the war. Many men from the regiment were recruited from Itawamba County in Mississippi.

== History ==
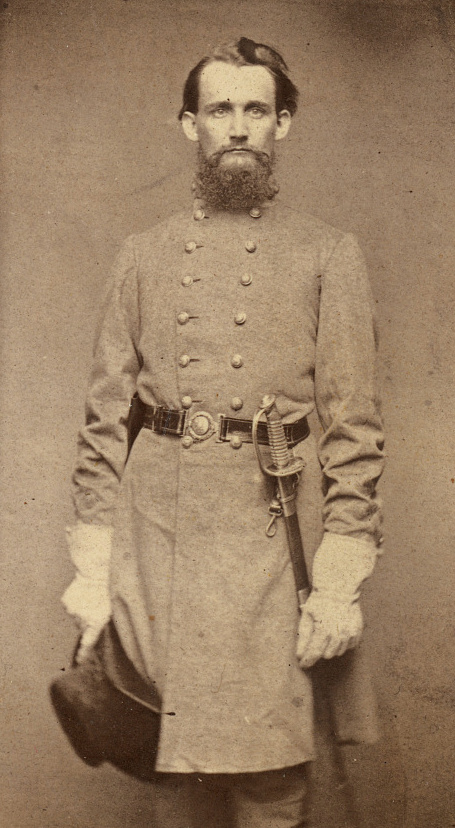
Col. John M. Simonton of the 1st Mississippi Regiment in 1862, after being captured at Fort Donelson.

The regiment was organized from May - August 1861 and sent to Iuka for training under the command of Colonel John M. Simonton, reporting a total strength of 682 men. The regiment was sent to Hopkinsville, Kentucky in October to reinforce General Albert Sidney Johnston, and then sent in February 1862 to Fort Donelson, Tennessee under General Gideon Johnson Pillow. The first major action of the 1st Regiment was at Battle of Fort Donelson, where it was involved in heavy fighting and captured by General Ulysses S. Grant's army along with the rest of the Confederate forces there.

The prisoners of the 1st Regiment were exchanged and reorganized in October, 1862 and then sent to Port Hudson, Louisiana. Colonel Simonton was reassigned during the Siege of Port Hudson from May - July 1863, with Major Thomas H. Johnston taking command of the regiment. Once again, the 1st Mississippi was captured by Union forces when the Confederate garrison at Port Hudson surrendered on July 9, 1863.

In May 1864, after most of the men had been exchanged, but while many of the officers were still being held as prisoners of war, the 1st Regiment was assigned to General Winfield S. Featherston's command, but would not reach nor participate in the Atlanta campaign until late July and early August. Prior to their arrival in Georgia the bulk of the regiment who were exchanged and fit for field service participated as skirmishers at the Battle of Tupelo.

In the Franklin–Nashville campaign the 1st Regiment took part in the Battle of Franklin on November 30 and the Battle of Nashville on December 15-16th under the command of Captain Owen Hughes, formerly of Company K. Captain Hughes and many of the men were killed at Nashville, and afterwards the 1st Regiment only had 67 men left capable of bearing arms. The remainder of the 1st Regiment was sent to join General Joseph E. Johnston's forces in the Carolinas and participated in some small actions there before surrendering on April 26, 1865, at Durham Station, North Carolina.

== Commanders ==
- Colonel John M. Simonton, reassigned October 1863.
- Lt. Col. A.S. Hamilton, died November 1863.
- Lt. Col. Thomas H. Johnston, taken prisoner July 1863.
- Major Milton S. Alcorn
- Captain Owen Hughes, killed in action December 1864.

== Organization ==
Companies of the 1st Mississippi Infantry Regiment:

- Company A, "Walker Reserves" of Marshall County.
- Company B, "Moorsville Darts" of Itawamba County.
- Company C, "Reub Davis Rebels" of Pontotoc County.
- Company D, "De Soto Grays" of De Soto County
- Company E, "Pleasant Mount Rifles" of Panola County
- Company F, "Alcorn Rifles" of Marshall County.
- Company G, "Dave Rogers Rifles" of Lafayette County
- Company H, "James Creek Volunteers" of Tishomingo County
- Company I, "Rifle Scouts" of Itawamba County
- Company K, "Mississippi Yankee Hunters" of Itawamba County.

== See also ==
- List of Mississippi Civil War Confederate units
