= Augustus E. Weathersby =

Former American politician

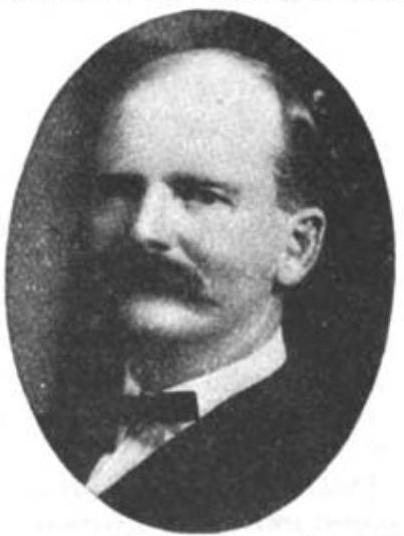
- c. 1907

Member of the Mississippi State Senate from the 8th district
- In office January 7, 1896 – January 2, 1900
- Preceded by: George A. Teunisson
- Succeeded by: Charles Chrisman

Personal details
- Born: April 16, 1864 Lawrence County, Mississippi, U. S.
- Died: January 13, 1924 (aged 59)
- Party: Democratic
- Relations: Andrew H. Longino (uncle)

Augustus Edward Weathersby (August 16, 1864 - January 13, 1924) was an American politician. He represented the 8th District in the Mississippi State Senate from 1896 to 1900.

== Biography ==
Augustus Edward Weathersby was born on April 16, 1864, in Lawrence County, Mississippi. He was the son of Dr. Willis G. Weathersby and Amanda R. (Longino) Weathersby, the sister of Mississippi governor Andrew H. Longino. He entered the University of Mississippi in 1882. During that time, he was a member of Delta Kappa Epsilon. He graduated from the University of Mississippi in 1885. He was then appointed deputy circuit and chancery clerk of Lawrence County. He served as a Notary Public from Greenwood, Mississippi, from 1890 to 1894. In 1895, Weathersby was elected to represent the 8th District (Lawrence County) in the Mississippi State Senate for the 1896–1900 term. During this term, Weathersby served on the following committees: Local and Private Legislation; Public Works; Universities and Colleges. In December 1897, Weathersby gave a speech to a mob opposing the lynching of Charles Lewis. After his Senate tenure ended, Weathersby focused on his law career in the Weathersby & Mayson law firm. He moved to Columbia, Mississippi, in 1900. In 1910, Weathersby was appointed Circuit Judge for Mississippi's 15th Circuit Court District. He was re-elected to that position in 1918.

== Personal life and death ==
Weathersby was a Baptist. He was a member of the Freemasons, the Woodmen of the World, the Odd Fellows, and the Knights of Pythias. Weathersby married Stella Bayliss on September 27, 1905. Weathersby died on January 13, 1924.
