= James F. McCool =

American politician and jurist

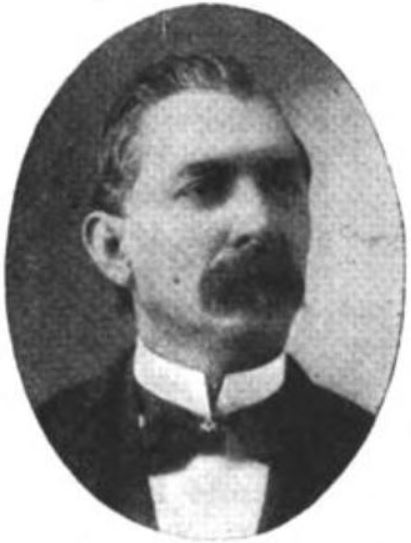

Speaker of the Mississippi House of Representatives
- In office January 1896 – January 1900
- Preceded by: James K. Vardaman
- Succeeded by: A. J. Russell

Member of the Mississippi House of Representatives from the Attala County district
- In office January 1896 – January 1900
- In office January 1882 – January 1886

Personal details
- Born: February 24, 1853 Fayette County, Alabama, U.S.
- Died: March 2, 1919 (aged 66) Kosciusko, Mississippi, U.S.
- Party: Democratic

James Franklin McCool (February 24, 1853 - March 2, 1919) was an American Democratic politician and jurist. He was a member of the Mississippi House of Representatives from 1882 to 1886 and from 1896 to 1900, and was its Speaker during the latter term.

== Biography ==
James Franklin McCool was born in Fayette County, Alabama, on February 24, 1853. His mother, Elender Gray McCool, died when James was young, and James's father, Lafayette McCool, died in the Confederate Army in the Civil War. McCool then traveled to Mississippi on foot, and made money to get an education. He received his education at Slate Springs College in Calhoun County, Mississippi. He graduated from the University of Mississippi with a Bachelor of Laws in 1879. For five years, he was a teacher in schools in Calhoun and Attala counties. He then practiced law in Kosciusko, Attala County, Mississippi.

== Political career ==
McCool was elected to represent Attala County as a Democrat in the Mississippi House of Representatives for the 1882 session. He was re-elected for the 1884 session. In 1883, the town of McCool, Mississippi, was named after him. McCool was a delegate to the Democratic National Convention of 1888. McCool was re-elected again to the Mississippi House of Representatives in 1895 for the 1896–1900 term. He served as the Speaker for this term. McCool then decided to run for the office of Governor of Mississippi, but withdrew in 1899 before the convention in Jackson. He then was a presidential elector in the 1900 election. In January 1903, McCool was appointed Chancellor of Mississippi's 6th Chancery Court district.

== Later life ==
McCool died on March 2, 1919, in Kosciusko, Mississippi.

== Personal life ==
McCool married Mary Niles, the daughter of Jason Niles, in 1881. They had one son, named Jason Niles McCool.
