= George Washington Gayles =

American politician (1844–1924)

George W. Gayles
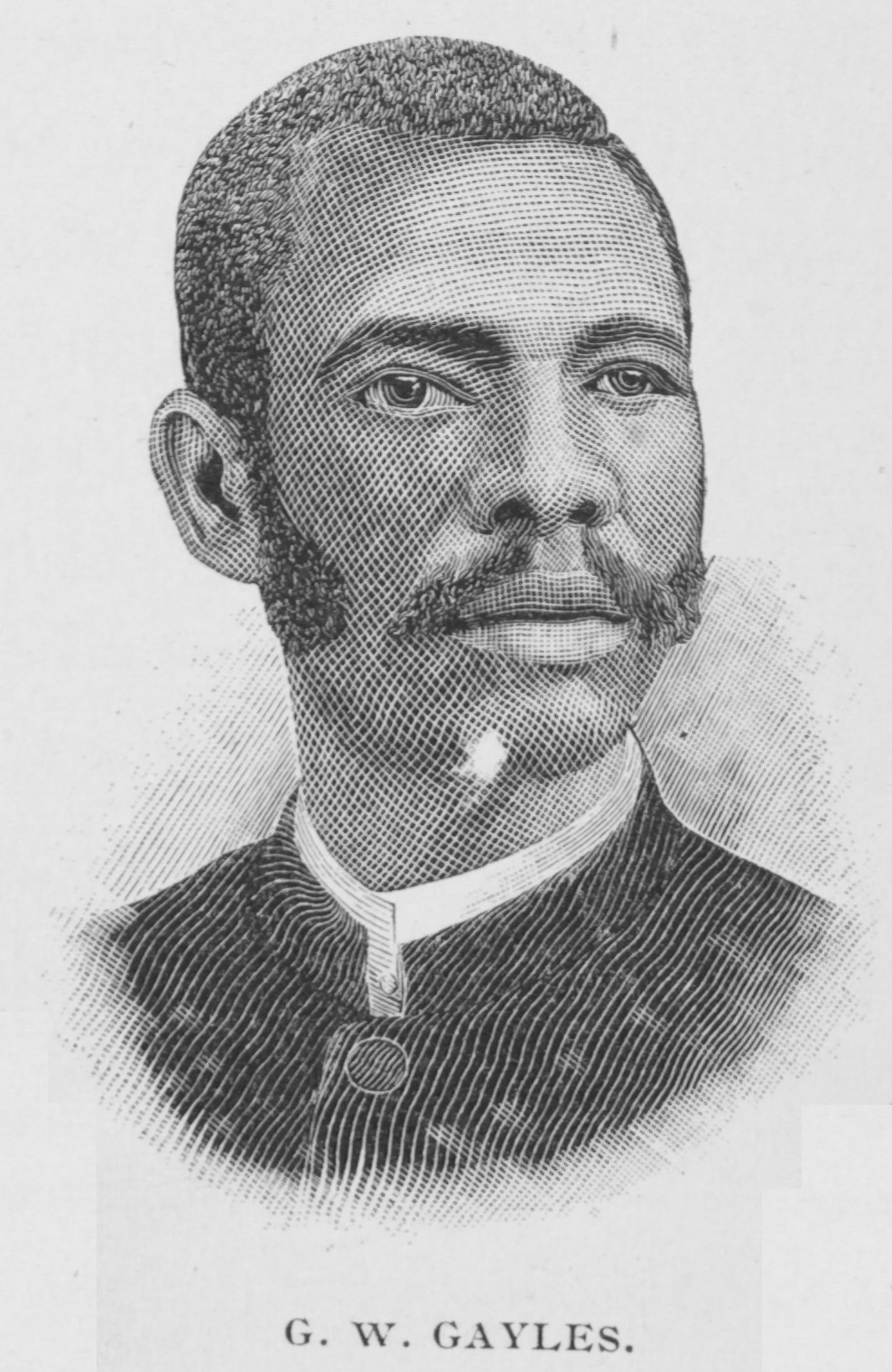
- Gayles in 1887
- Born: June 29, 1844; William Haile Plantation Wilkinson County, Mississippi, United States
- Died: March 5, 1924 (aged 79); Bolivar County, Mississippi, United States
- Occupation: Minister
- Political party: Republican

Religious life
- Religion: Baptist

George Washington Gayles (June 29, 1844 – March 5, 1924) was an American Baptist minister and state legislator in Mississippi. He served in the Mississippi House of Representatives from 1872 until 1875 and in the Mississippi Senate from 1878 until 1886. He was a candidate for the United States House of Representatives in 1892, but received only 6% of the vote due to the voter suppression laws of that period. He was also a noted Baptist minister and was known as the "Father of the Convention" of African American Baptists in Mississippi.

== Early life ==
George Washington Gayles was born a slave in Wilkinson County, Mississippi on June 29, 1844 to Perry and Rebecca Gayles and owned by Emily Haile. As a child, he was taught to read by Elizabeth Powell, who was employed to teach the daughters of Nancy Barrow. Gayles especially loved reading the bible and hymn book. In 1863, he joined the Union Army in the American Civil War (1861–1865) where he remained until December 1864.

== Early religious career ==
Gayles sought a career in the ministry, and on November 21, 1867 he was ordained at Mount Horeb Baptist church in Greenville, Mississippi. He then formed the Kindling Altar Church in Bolivar county. In 1872, he was appointed missionary of Bolivar and Sunflower County, and later was appointed missionary for Coahoma County. In 1874, he was elected corresponding secretary of the Baptist State Missionary Convention of Mississippi and in July 1876 he was elected president of the Baptist Missionary State convention, a position he continued to hold until after 1887, being mentioned in that position in 1893, and later. In 1885, he was chairman of the Colored Baptist Convention of Mississippi, Louisiana, and Arkansas. In 1878, he became pastor of Mout Horeb Missionary Baptist Church in Greenville, Mississippi.

== Political career ==
Gayles also had a successful political career after the war, initially as an appointed civil servant, and from 1872 until 1887 as an elected official. On September 17, 1869 he was appointed member of the Board of Police for District Number Three, Bolivar County by George A. Ames, and on August 2, 1870 he was appointed Justice of the Peace for the Fifth District, Bolivar Count by Governor James L. Alcorn. On August 29, 1870, Gayles was appointed supervisor of the Fifth District, an appointment he held only until November.

He was elected to numerous Republican State Conventions starting in 1869 and was a delegate to the 1880 Republican National Convention. In 1880, Republicans were split between a number of candidates, and Mississippi republicans were split between John Sherman and Ulysses S. Grant. At the convention, Grant originally received the largest share of the vote, James G. Blaine was the initial second largest vote getter and Sherman third, but none received a majority. Gayles was a member of the "three hundred and six" which supported Grant in all ballots, but Grant never got more than 308 votes and the eventual nominee and then president was James A. Garfield.

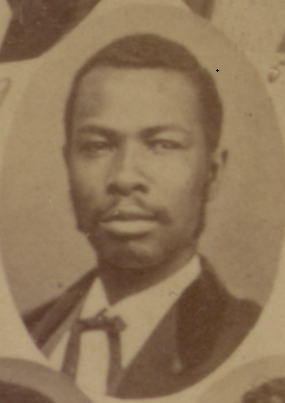
Photograph of Gayles as a state representative in 1874 by E. von Seutter

He was elected to the Mississippi House of Representatives in 1872, serving until 1873, and then reelected in 1874 serving until 1875. He was then elected to the Mississippi Senate in 1878, and again in 1880 serving until 1882, and then again in 1884 and 1886. Gayles also served in the House as a representative of Bolivar County as late as 1894. In the House, he represented the 28th district, which included Bolivar, Coahoma, and Quitman County. In the Senate, he represented the ninth district, including Bolivar, Coahoma, and Sunflower counties. He was also chairman of the Third district Republican Convention in 1886 in Mississippi consisting of Bolivar, Coahoma, Issaquena, Leflore, Sunflower, Sharkey, Tunica, Quitman, Washington, and Warren counties. He was the only black state senator in Mississippi during his terms and was the last black state senator in Mississippi (It would not be until 1979 when two Black state senators were elected to represent Hinds County where Jackson is located)

== Later career ==
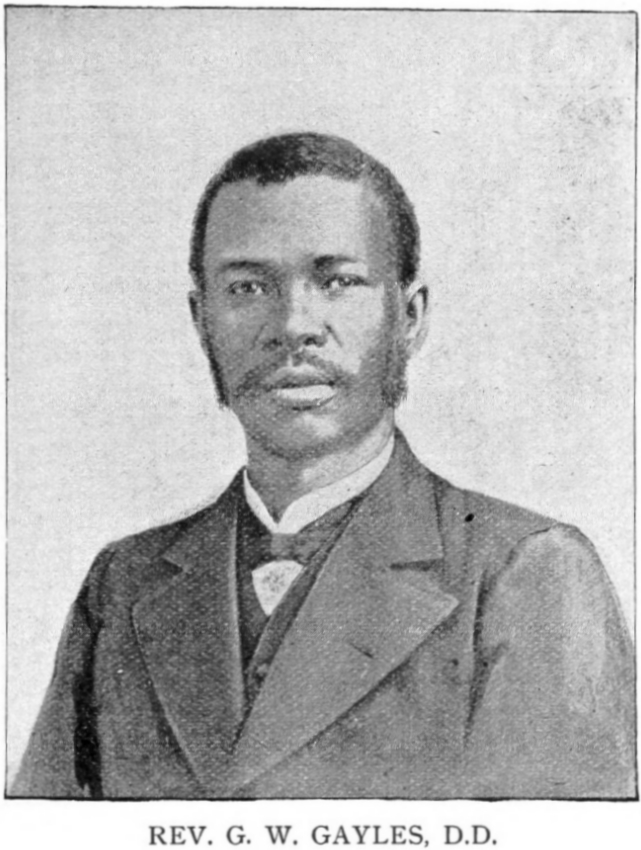
Gayles in 1892

In 1880, the Baptist State Missionary Convention with Gayles still at its head created a journal, the Baptist Signal, and made Gayles editor. Under the leadership of Gayles, the convention opened Natchez College in Natchez in 1884. Gayles played a prominent role in the National Baptist convention in St. Louis in August 1886. The convention was led by its president, William J. Simmons, and a vice-president was selected from each state represented, with Gayles selected to represent Mississippi. Gayles was again a prominent participant in the 1888 National Baptist Convention. A major theme of both conventions was unity of African American Baptists and the consolidation of a number of bodies such as the Colored Missionary Associations and the Co-operation of the American Baptist Missionary Union.

Gayles was again a delegate at the 1892 Republican National Convention in Minneapolis. Also in 1892, Gayles ran for a seat in the US House of Representatives against Thomas C. Catchings where he received only 159 votes (6% of the total vote) in the face of suppression of black and Republican suffrage in Mississippi and other US States. The Chairman of the Third District Republican Executive Committee, Willis Elbert Mollison, stated that there was no chance of a Republican candidate getting elected, but that the Republican party wished to keep alive their organization and to control Federal patronage in the event of Republican Benjamin Harrison being elected president, although in the end Democrat Grover Cleveland won in that year. Gayles again sought congressional nomination in 1900.

In 1902, Gayles was a delegate to the National Afro-American Press Association meeting in St. Paul, Minnesota, which was held in conjunction with the National Afro-American Council, the National Educational Association, and the Afro-American State Convention. In 1904, Gayles was called the "Father of the Convention" of black Baptists of Mississippi. He was also elected as a delegate from Mississippi to the international convention of Colored Baptists to be held in London, England. Gayles was known as a firebrand and he was divisive in his preaching and his leadership.

Outside of the ministry and politics, Gayles was a successful planter. In the 1900s and 1910s his preaching at Mount Horeb led to great friction in his church, and he and a number of deacons were disbarred from the church and left it to form the New Hope First Baptist Church. He also left the black Baptist State Convention of Mississippi to form the General Missionary Progressive Baptist State Convention of Mississippi in the mid 1910s.

Gayles died March 5, 1924.
