= Joel P. Walker =

American politician (1840–1898)

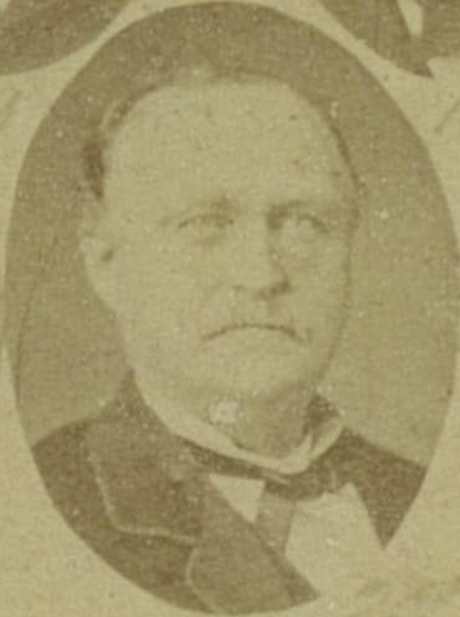
- c. 1884

President pro tempore of the Mississippi State Senate
- In office January 3, 1888 – January 7, 1890
- Preceded by: Reuben O. Reynolds
- Succeeded by: Robert Aaron Dean

Member of the Mississippi State Senate from the 20th district
- In office January 8, 1884 – January 5, 1892
- Preceded by: L. B. Brown
- Succeeded by: E. N. Scudder

Member of the Mississippi House of Representatives from the Lauderdale County district
- In office 1865–1867

Personal details
- Born: October 3, 1840 Lauderdale County, Mississippi, U.S.
- Died: January 3, 1898 (aged 57) Meridian, Mississippi, U.S.
- Party: Democratic
- Children: 6

Joel P. Walker (October 3, 1840 – January 3, 1898) was an American politician and lawyer. He was a Democratic member of the Mississippi State Senate from 1884 to 1892, serving as its President Pro Tempore in 1888, and of the Mississippi House of Representatives from 1865 to 1867, representing Lauderdale County, Mississippi.

== Early life ==
Joel P. Walker was born October 3, 1840, in Lauderdale County, Mississippi. He was the son of John R. Walker and his wife, Martha A. (Felton) Walker. John R. Walker was a large-scale slaveowner who served in the North Carolina General Assembly and then moved to Mississippi alongside his brother (also named Joel P.) in 1836.

The younger Joel P. Walker was the eldest of John R. and Martha Walker's 6 sons and 6 daughters. Joel grew up on a farm and attended the public schools. In 1858, Walker began attending the University of North Carolina at Chapel Hill, where he studied law.

== Military career ==
After the attack on Fort Sumter and the start of the American Civil War, Walker returned home to Lauderdale County where he joined the infantry in the Confederate States Army. Walker fought at the Battle of Ball's Bluff, at which Walker's lieutenant was killed and Walker was promoted to replace him. Walker was then promoted to captain in order for him to recruit a new company of soldiers. However, Walker's position became unnecessary due to legally obligated conscriptions from the Confederate Conscription Acts of 1862–1864, leaving Walker without a unit.

Walker then joined the Second Mississippi Cavalry and was elected his company's Second Lieutenant. Walker was captured alongside most of his company at Oxford, Mississippi. He was taken to a variety of prisoner of war camps. He was first sent to Alton, Illinois, then Camp Chase, and finally to Baltimore, where he stayed for four months until a prisoner exchange in Petersburg. After being released, Walker rejoined his unit in Spring Hill, Tennessee, and served under Generals Frank Crawford Armstrong and Nathan Bedford Forrest until the end of the war.

== Political career ==
After the war ended, Walker was elected to represent Lauderdale County in the Mississippi House of Representatives, and served for three sessions between 1865 and 1867. Walker was the second-youngest member of the Mississippi Legislature during these terms.

After his terms in the House ended, Walker was admitted to the bar in February 1867 and began practicing law in Meridian, Mississippi. Governor James L. Alcorn appointed Walker to the office of District Attorney.

In 1883, Walker was elected to represent the 20th District as a Democrat in the Mississippi State Senate for a four-year term lasting from January 8, 1884, to January 3, 1888. In 1886, Walker was heavily considered as a frontrunner for the Democratic nomination for Governor of Mississippi, but Walker withdrew before the nominating convention. In 1887, Walker was re-elected to represent the same district for the 1888–1892 term. On the first day of the Senate term on January 3, 1888, Walker was nominated for and then elected to be the Senate's President pro tempore, defeating Senator F. M. Boone in a 25–10 vote. In the 1890 session (on January 7, 1890), Walker nominated Robert A. Dean to be the President Pro Tempore for the session, and Dean was elected. Walker's Senate term ended on January 5, 1892, and he was replaced in the 20th District by E. N. Scudder.

After Walker left the Senate, he continued his law career as the senior member of the Walker and Hall law firm. The firm were the official attorneys for the Meridian National Bank.

On January 3, 1898, Walker died at 8 PM at his home in Meridian, after "an illness of several weeks".

== Personal life ==
Walker was a member of the Knights of Honor and was a Freemason. He was a member of the Episcopalian Church. Walker married Mary Johnson in 1867, but she died after 11 months after the marriage. They had one daughter together, who married E. C. Williams. On April 4, 1871, Walker married Sallie Reynolds. They had five children together: Joseph P., Hallie C., Wallace R., Paton E., and Sallie R.
