= Charles Ehrman =

American politician

Member of the Mississippi House of Representatives from the Warren County district
- In office January 1896 – January 1900 Serving with George Anderson; J. W. Collier

Personal details
- Born: April 9, 1836 France
- Died: January 12, 1922 (aged 85) Yazoo City, Mississippi
- Party: Democratic

Charles Ehrman (April 9, 1836 – January 12, 1922) was a French-born American politician. He represented Warren County in the Mississippi House of Representatives from 1896 to 1900.

== Early life ==
Charles Ehrman was born in France on April 9, 1836. He emigrated from Alsace-Lorraine to the United States. He served in the Confederate Army and was captured at Memphis, but later paroled. He was a stock trader who lived in Vicksburg. His family owned a large meat dealing business. He represented Warren County as a Democrat in the Mississippi House of Representatives starting on January 7, 1896. Ehrman died on January 12, 1922, in Yazoo City, Mississippi.

== Personal life ==
Ehrman was Jewish. He married Clara Elbert on July 27, 1855, in Mobile County, Alabama. His son, Albert A. Ehrman, was born on July 1, 1860, in Hillsboro, Mississippi. He had two other sons, Jake and Henry Moses.
