= Abram Lewenthal =

American lawyer and politician

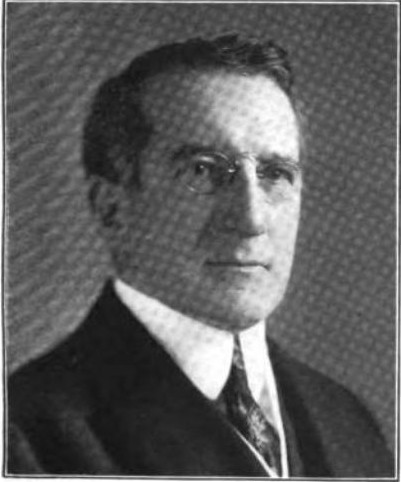
- Lewenthal in 1921

Member of the Mississippi State Senate from the 29th district
- In office January 7, 1896 – January 2, 1900 Serving with W. R. Trigg

Personal details
- Born: October 12, 1864 Mississippi, U. S.
- Died: April 17, 1943 (aged 78) Cleveland, Ohio, U. S.
- Party: Republican
- Other political affiliations: Democratic (before 1900)
- Children: 1

Abram Lewenthal (October 12, 1864 - April 17, 1943) was an American lawyer and politician. He represented the 29th District in the Mississippi State Senate from 1896 to 1900.

== Biography ==
Abram Lewenthal was born on October 12, 1864, in Mississippi. He had a sister, Annie. He attended public and high schools. He attended the University of Mississippi and was a member of the Class of 1878. He was admitted to the bar in Mississippi in 1885. He then practiced law in Greenville, Mississippi, under the Skinner & Lewenthal law firm.

He then served as the Mayor of Brookhaven, Mississippi, for one term ending in 1891. On November 7, 1895, Lewenthal was elected to represent Washington County as a Democrat as part of the 29th District of the Mississippi State Senate for the 1896-1900 term. During this term, he served on the Judiciary, Printing, Federal Relations and Levees, committees. In 1899, Lewenthal moved to Cleveland, Ohio, and was admitted to the Ohio bar in 1900. Lewenthal was a member of the Horr & Lewenthal law firm from 1900 to 1917. By 1921 Lewenthal was a Republican.

Lewenthal died on April 17, 1943 at his home in Cleveland, Ohio.

== Personal life ==
Lewenthal was Jewish. He married May Mahler on May 10, 1900. They had one child, Jeanne.
