= A. J. Russell =

Mississippi politician

Speaker of the Mississippi House of Representatives
- In office January 2, 1900 – June 4, 1902
- Preceded by: J. F. McCool
- Succeeded by: Emmet Thomas

Member of the Mississippi House of Representatives from the Lauderdale County district
- In office January 1896 – June 4, 1902

Personal details
- Born: January 23, 1852 Alabama, U.S.
- Died: June 4, 1902 (aged 50) Oxford, Mississippi, U.S.
- Party: Democratic

Adoniram Judson "Jud" Russell (January 23, 1852 - June 4, 1902) was an American politician. He was the speaker of the Mississippi House of Representatives from 1900 to his death.

== Biography ==
Adoniram Judson Russell was born on January 23, 1852, in Alabama. He moved with his parents to Verona, Lee County, Mississippi, when he was a young boy. Russell was born into poverty, and he had difficulties receiving an education.

Russell became a lawyer and then practiced at Tupelo. He moved to Meridian, Mississippi, when he was appointed to the position of district counsel of the Mobile and Ohio Railroad, the same railroad for which his brother was the general solicitor.

In 1895, Russell was elected to represent Meridian, part of the Lauderdale County district, in the Mississippi House of Representatives for the 1896–1900 term. He was a member of the Democratic Party. He was re-elected in 1899 for the 1900–1904 term and was unanimously elected to the position of Speaker in January 1900. Russell died unexpectedly of a heart attack in bed on June 4, 1902. He had been visiting Oxford, Mississippi, to give the annual commencement address for the University of Mississippi.
