= Francis M. Sheppard =

American politician

- 1910s

Member of the Mississippi Senate from the 2nd district
- In office 1900–1904

Member of the Mississippi Legislature from the Wayne County district
- In office 1896–1900

Personal details
- Born: December 22, 1868 Lawrence County, Mississippi
- Died: August 15, 1948 (aged 79) St. Louis, Missouri
- Party: Democrat

Dr. Francis Marion Sheppard (December 22, 1868 – August 15, 1948) was a Mississippi politician and a Democratic member of the Mississippi State Senate from 1900 to 1904, and the Mississippi House of Representatives from 1896 to 1900. He was a physician by career.

== Early life ==
Francis Marion Sheppard was born on December 22, 1868, near Monticello, Lawrence County, Mississippi, the son of Augustus Washington Sheppard and Permelia (Phillips) Sheppard. He received education from public schools of the Lawrence and Marion counties. He graduated from the Lumberton, MS High School. He then graduated from the University of Kentucky medical program in 1893.

== Political career ==
Sheppard was elected to the Mississippi House of Representatives in 1896, representing Wayne County from 1896 to 1900. He was elected to the Mississippi State Senate in 1900, representing the state's 2nd District, which consisted of Mississippi's Wayne, Jones, Perry, and Greene counties. He continued this post until 1904. In 1910, he became the Mississippi Railroad Commissioner, and became the president of the Mississippi State Railroad Commission in 1912. His term would expire in July 1920.

== Personal life ==
He married Josie Best in 1894. They had three children, Edith, Zellein, and Allen Augustus.

He died on August 15, 1948, in Saint Louis, Missouri.
