= Glenville, Mississippi =

- Unincorporated community
- Location within Mississippi Location within the United States
- Coordinates: 34°31′42″N 89°44′24″W
- Country: United States
- State: Mississippi
- County: Panola
- Elevation: 459 ft (140 m)
- Time zone: UTC-6 (Central (CST))
  - Summer (DST): UTC-5 (CDT)
- ZIP code: 38619
- Area code: 662
- GNIS feature ID: 691891

Glenville is an unincorporated community located in Panola County, Mississippi. Glenville is approximately 4.3 miles (6.9 km) south-southwest of Tyro and approximately 7.2 miles (11.6 km) southeast of Looxahoma on near Mississippi Highway 310.

A post office operated under the name Glenville from 1871 to 1909.

During Alan Lomax's Southern Journey, Bob Pratcher, who was born in Glenville, was recorded playing guitar in nearby Como.
