= Stephen Thrasher =

American politician

Stephen Thrasher

Stephen Thrasher (c. 1833 - 1913) was a Civil War veteran, lawyer, and state senator in Mississippi. He served in the Claiborne Guards and was involved in several battles during the American Civil War, was injured, and captured. He and his wife owned large plantations. He was twice elected to the Mississippi Senate in 1886 and 1889. He lived in Port Gibson, Mississippi in Claiborne County.

Thrasher was the son of William Thrasher and the grandson of Stephen Thrasher of Kentucky, a soldier and state legislator who fought in the War of 1812 and against Native American tribes in Ohio. He also served as a state legislator in Kentucky.

He served as president of the Port Gibson Oil Works.
