= M. M. Evans =

American politician (1850–1911)

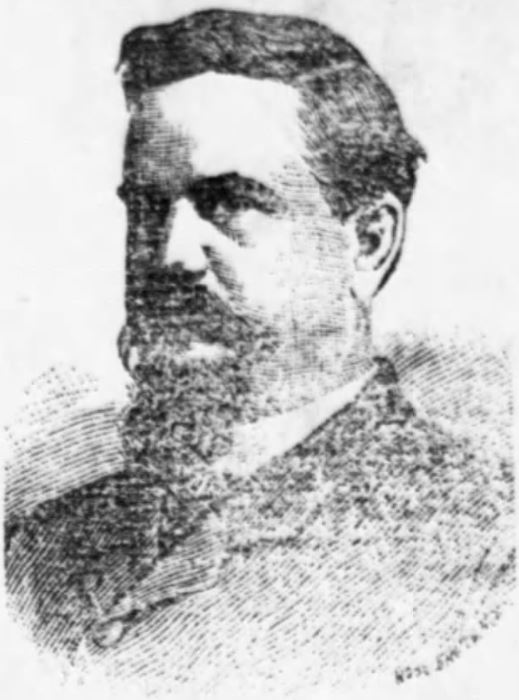
- 1889

12th Lieutenant Governor of Mississippi
- In office January 1890 – January 1896
- Governor: John M. Stone
- Preceded by: G. D. Shands
- Succeeded by: J. H. Jones

Personal details
- Born: July 5, 1850 Handsboro, Mississippi, U.S.
- Died: October 9, 1911 (aged 61) Jackson, Mississippi, U.S.
- Party: Democratic

Marion McKay Evans (July 5, 1850 - October 9, 1911) was an American politician. He was the Lieutenant Governor of Mississippi from 1890 to 1896.

== Biography ==
Marion McKay Evans was born on July 5, 1850, in Handsboro, Mississippi. He was the son of William J. Evans. He attended the Salem high school in Greene County, Mississippi, before leaving at the age of 16. He then engaged in the mercantile business. He later moved to Moss Point, Mississippi, and then to Mt. Olive, Mississippi. While residing in Collins, Mississippi, he died on October 9, 1911, in a sanitorium in Jackson, Mississippi.

=== Political career ===
In 1885, Evans ran for the office of Secretary of State of Mississippi. In the state Democratic convention, he received the support of much of Southern Mississippi and led the first eleven ballots, but ultimately lost the Democratic nomination by twelve votes. In 1889, Evans was elected to the office of Lieutenant Governor of Mississippi as a Democrat. He held this office from 1890 to 1896. He then served as a member of the Mississippi Railroad Commission from 1896 to 1900. In 1898, Evans ran to represent Mississippi's 8th District in the 56th Congress. He lost to the incumbent, Frank Alexander McLain.

=== Personal life ===
Evans was a Methodist. He married Emma K. Airey in 1875. Evans was a member of the Freemasons; he was the Grandmaster of the Masons in Mississippi in 1889. He was related to Mississippi State Senator Wesley G. Evans and Judge T. E. Evans.
