= John M. Simonton =

Mississippi politician (1830–1898)

Colonel John M. Simonton
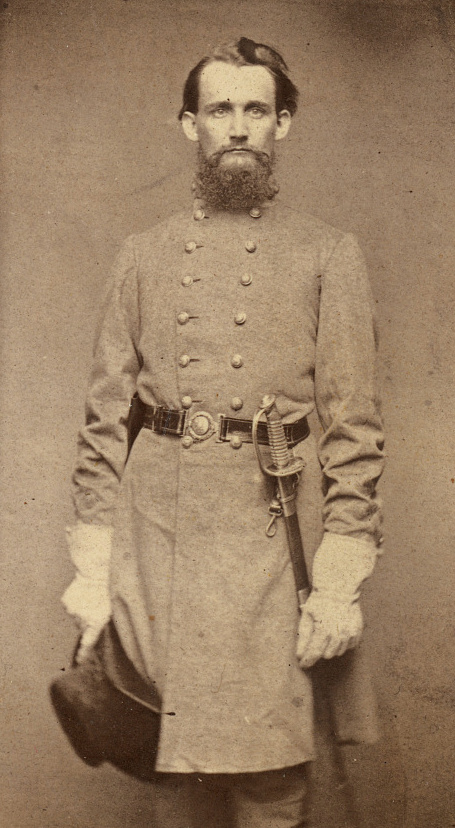
- John M. Simonton, 1862
- Born: June 17, 1830; Lawrence County, Tennessee, US
- Died: June 24, 1898 (aged 68); Jackson, Mississippi, US
- Military career
- Branch: Confederate States Army; Mississippi State Troops
- Service years: 1861 - 1865
- Rank: Colonel
- Commands: 1st Mississippi Infantry Regiment
- Conflicts: American Civil War; Battle of Fort Donelson; Siege of Port Hudson

John M. Simonton was an officer in the Confederate Army during the American Civil War and a state senator in Mississippi. He served in the Mississippi Senate from 1859 to 1869. He was President of the Mississippi Senate from 1865 to 1869.

During the Civil War, Simonton was Colonel of the 1st Mississippi Infantry Regiment. He was captured during the Battle of Fort Donelson. After being exchanged, during the siege of Port Hudson in 1863, Simonton was reassigned to command a consolidated Alabama regiment, later resigning his commission for health reasons. In 1864 he became a Colonel in the Mississippi State Troops.
