= Horace Bloomfield (politician) =

American politician (1855–1944)

Member of the Mississippi State Senate from the 1st district 31st (1890–1892)
- In office January 5, 1904 – January 7, 1908
- Preceded by: Wesley G. Evans
- Succeeded by: W. T. McDonald
- In office January 7, 1890 – January 7, 1896
- Succeeded by: E. J. Bowers

Member of the Mississippi House of Representatives from the Harrison and Jackson Counties district
- In office January 1908 – January 1912

Personal details
- Born: September 30, 1855 New Orleans, Louisiana, U. S.
- Died: September 1944 (aged 88)
- Party: Democratic

Horace Bloomfield (September 30, 1855 - September 1944) was an American lawyer and politician. He served two terms in the Mississippi State Senate, from 1890 to 1896 and from 1904 to 1908. He also served in the Mississippi House of Representatives from 1908 to 1912.

== Early life ==
Horace Bloomfield was born on September 30, 1855, in New Orleans. He was the son of George Thomas Bloomfield, an emigrant from Tittlesdale, Norfolk, England, and Harriett Elizabeth (Baldwin) Bloomfield, who was of English descent. Horace moved to Mississippi with his family in early childhood. He attended early schools in Handsboro, and then Trinity High School in Pass Christian. He then studied law in the office of W. G. Henderson and was admitted to the bar in the late 1870s.

== Career ==
Bloomfield started to practice law in 1878, forming a partnership with Roderick Seal. In 1889, Bloomfield was elected as a Democrat to the Mississippi State Senate. He represented the 31st District in 1890. He was re-elected on November 3, 1891, this time representing the 1st District. His term ended in 1896. After his partnership with Seal ended in 1899, he formed the Bloomfield & Cowan law firm with R. C. Cowan. On November 3, 1903, Bloomfield was re-elected to the Senate, representing the Senate's 1st District. During the 1904–1908 term, Bloomfield served on the following committees: Judiciary; Railroads & Finances; Federal Relations; Public Lands; Public Health & Quarantine; and the Joint Committee Investigating State Officers. In 1906, he helped organize and establish the Mississippi State Bar Association. On November 5, 1907, Bloomfield was elected to represent Harrison and Jackson Counties in the Mississippi House of Representatives for the 1908–1912 term. He served as an attorney for the Louisville & Nashville Railroad Company.

== Personal life and death ==
Bloomfield was a Vice Chancellor in the Knights of Pythias. He was also a member of the Freemasons, Odd Fellows, and Woodmen of the World. He was unmarried as of 1904. He died in September 1944.
