= E. von Seutter =

German-American jeweler and photographer (1827–1901)

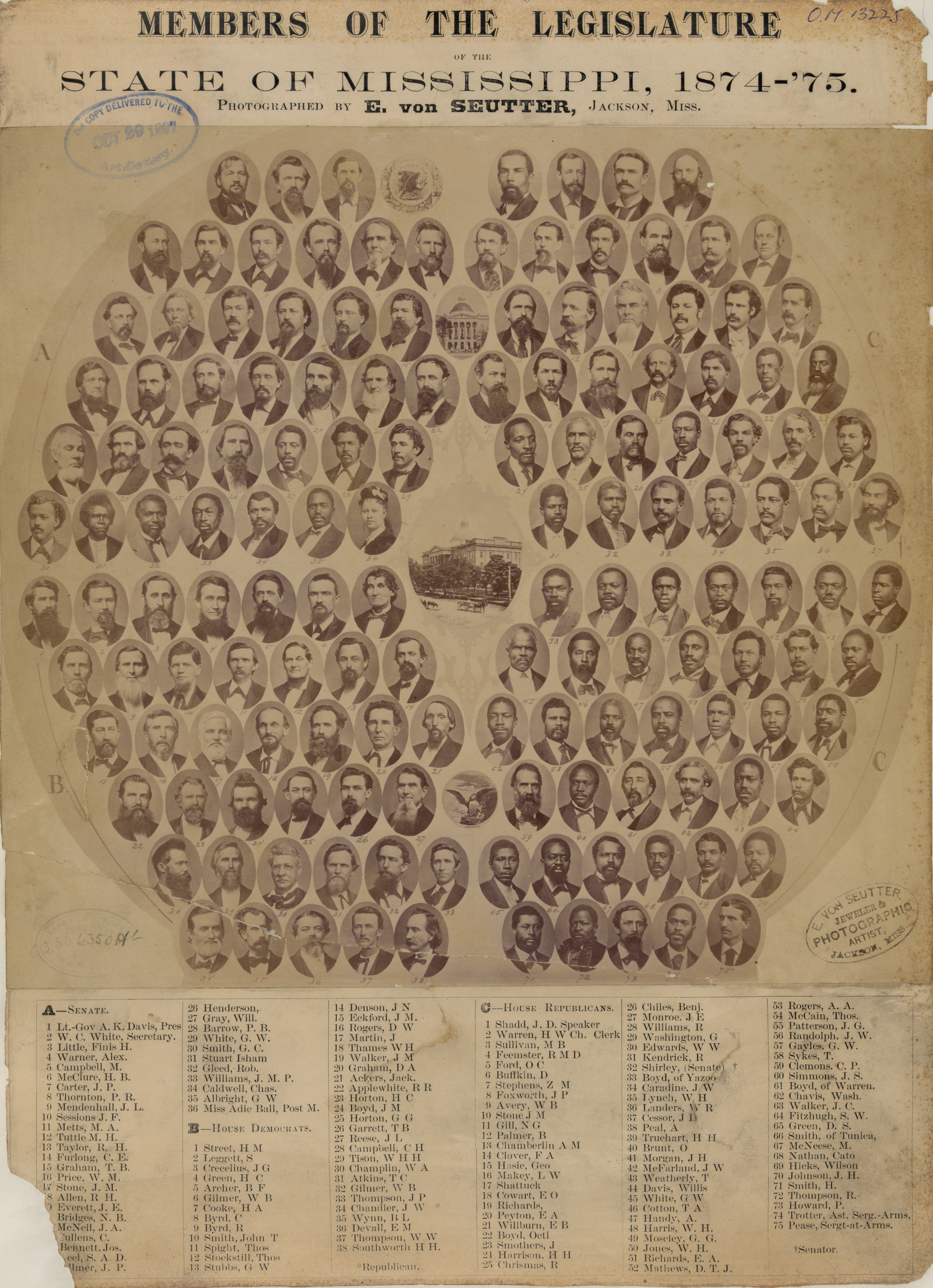
Photo montage of members of the 1874 Mississippi legislature by Steutter

Elisaeus Von Seutter (1827 - 1901) was a jeweler, photographer, and writer based in Jackson, Mississippi.

Seutter was born in 1827 in Swabia near Lake Constance in modern-day Germany. After his schooling, he lived with his brothers and sisters in Prague and worked at Seutter & Co, an importing house in the area. Despite opposition from his family, he immigrated to the United States in 1848, first landing in New Orleans. He went on to St. Louis, where he became ill with malaria, and later traveled to Vicksburg, Mississippi to go into the jewelry business with Max Kuner, his old schoolmate.

In 1851, Seutter moved to Raymond, Mississippi, and on April 16 of that year, he established a business. In 1858, a fire swept through Port Gibson street in Raymond, destroying part of his business and others'.

He lost his possessions during the American Civil War. He restarted his jewelry business around 1865 in nearby Jackson. His store eventually carried watches and clocks, silver and glassware, diamonds, and other goods. As part of his business, Seutter provided engraving services for swords and memorabilia. His son, Carl J. v. Seutter, who was an optician, watchmaker, and diamond expert, also worked at his father's store.

Seutter added photography to his business after he bought out a daguerreotype photographer. He took stereoscopic images. He also photographed legislators. He was eventually joined at his studio by his son Armine von Seutter. Von Seutter photographed Jackson, his family, and his home. In 1869, he took a series of photographs that created a panoramic view of downtown Jackson, which were displayed in City Hall.

His son Edward Raymond Von Seutter became an ophthalmologist. In 1872 his son Armine sailed for Germany from New Orleans to complete his education. Seutter lived in Ivy Cottage, a home in North Jackson.

Seutter committed suicide on January 3, 1901, a year after his wife died.
