= Wesley G. Evans =

American politician (1844–1921)

Member of the Mississippi Senate from the 1st district
- In office January 1900 – January 1904

Member of the Mississippi House of Representatives from the Harrison County district
- In office January 1890 – January 1892

Personal details
- Born: January 28, 1844 Mississippi City, Mississippi, U.S.
- Died: September 3, 1921 (aged 77) Gulfport, Mississippi, U.S.
- Party: Democratic

Wesley Griffin Evans Jr. (January 28, 1844 – September 3, 1921) was a Mississippi politician and Democratic state legislator from Harrison County in the late 19th and early 20th centuries.

== Biography ==
He was born on January 28, 1844, in Mississippi City, Mississippi. He was the son of W. G. Evans Sr. and his wife, Lucetta Woodruff Evans. He fought in the Confederate Army in the American Civil War.After returning from the war he became a sawmiller for a short period of time. In 1881 he began to study law, and eventually became a licensed lawyer in Mississippi. He represented Harrison County in the Mississippi House of Representatives from 1890 to 1892. He was a member of the Mississippi State Senate from 1900 to 1904, representing the 1st District, consisting of Mississippi's Hancock, Harrison, and Jackson counties. He died on September 3, 1921, in his residence in Gulfport, Mississippi. He was known during his life for the creation of Evans Road Law, a law that gave bonds and tax levies to those who worked on improving roads in Mississippi.

=== Personal life ===
Evans was married to Susan Carter. They had a son named Thomas Marshall Evans, who was born in 1862 and later became a lawyer in Gulfport. He later married Alice Walden, and their son, Houston Hewes Evans (born 1895), served in the Mississippi House of Representatives from 1920 to 1932. Evans was related to another Mississippi politician, M. M. Evans.
