= T. A. Wood =

American politician

Member of the Mississippi State Senate from the 3rd district 30th (1888-1892)
- In office January 7, 1896 – May 10, 1897
- In office January 1888 – January 1892

Personal details
- Born: March 13, 1852 Lauderdale County, Mississippi, U. S.
- Died: October 19, 1936 (aged 84) Mississippi City, Mississippi, U. S.
- Party: Democratic

Thaddeus Alonzo Wood (March 13, 1852 - October 19, 1936) was an American politician. He served in the Mississippi State Senate 1888 and 1892 and 1896 and 1897.

== Early life ==
Thaddeus Alonzo Wood was born on March 13, 1852, in Lauderdale County, Mississippi. He was the fourth of six children of James H. Wood (c. 1812 - 1867) and Mary (Smith) Wood (1807–1887). He also had four half-siblings from his mother's previous marriage to a Mr. Hill: Thomas T., Elam, William H. H., and Mary. Wood grew up in Smith County, Mississippi. He moved to Arkansas in 1867. He then attended Jacksonville College in Arkansas in 1873 and 1876, and the Sylvania Institute in 1874 and 1875. Between 1877 and 1879, Wood attended Southwestern University. Wood then became a schoolteacher, teaching at Sylvania in 1880 and, after returning to Mississippi, taught at Quitman in 1881. He then read law under Samuel Terral between 1881 and 1882, and then took over Terral's law firm after being admitted to the bar.

== Career ==
In 1887, Wood was elected to represent the 30th District in the Mississippi State Senate for the 1888 and 1890 sessions. On November 7, 1895, Wood was elected to represent the 3rd District (Clarke and Jasper Counties) as a Democrat in the Mississippi State Senate for the 1896–1900 term. On May 10, 1897, Wood was appointed Circuit Judge for the 2nd District, resigning from the Senate in the process.

== Personal life ==
Wood was a Baptist. He married Anna L. Hassell (born 1867) on September 29, 1886. Their children included Mary, who died in infancy, and Florence. Wood remarried, on December 22, 1904, to Ruth Aurelia Drane (b. 1878). They had the following children: Walter Lee (b. June 7, 1910); Mary Drane (b. May 27, 1915), and James Broaddus (b. January 17, 1918). Wood died in Mississippi City on October 19, 1936, aged 84.
