= G. G. Dillard =

American politician

Member of the Mississippi State Senate from the 19th district
- In office January 1884 – January 1892

Personal details
- Born: 1839 Oktibbeha County, Mississippi, U.S.
- Died: June 13, 1921 (aged 82) Starkville, Mississippi, U.S.
- Party: Democratic

George G. Dillard (1839 - June 13, 1921) was an American lawyer, soldier, and politician.

Born in 1839 in Oktibbeha County, Mississippi, he was the eldest son of eleven children of Thomas Wise Dillard (born 1808) and Sarah B. Dunpree. His siblings included Dr. W. R. Dillard (died 1909) and Virginia Anson Lewis Dillard Lowrence (1850-1911). He entered the University of Mississippi in 1857 and graduated in 1861.

He served as a sergeant and then Captain in the 35th Mississippi Infantry in the Confederate Army. He was then a commander in Mississippi's National Guard.

An attorney, he served as Mayor of Macon, Mississippi from 1872 to 1879. He represented the 19th District in the Mississippi State Senate from 1884 to 1892. He represented Noxubee County at the 1890 Mississippi Constitutional Convention. In April 1893, Dillard was appointed Consul-General to Guayaquil by Grover Cleveland.

He was a National Guard commander at the unveiling ceremonies for a monument to Confederate Army veterans in Jackson, Mississippi.

Dillard died at his home near Starkville, Mississippi, on June 13, 1921, aged 82.

== Social life ==
Dillard was a "lifelong member" of the Episcopal Church. He was a member of the Odd Fellows, the Knights of Pythias, the Knights of Honor, and the A.F. & A.M. He never married.
