= George F. Bowles =

American lawyer and politician (1844–1899)

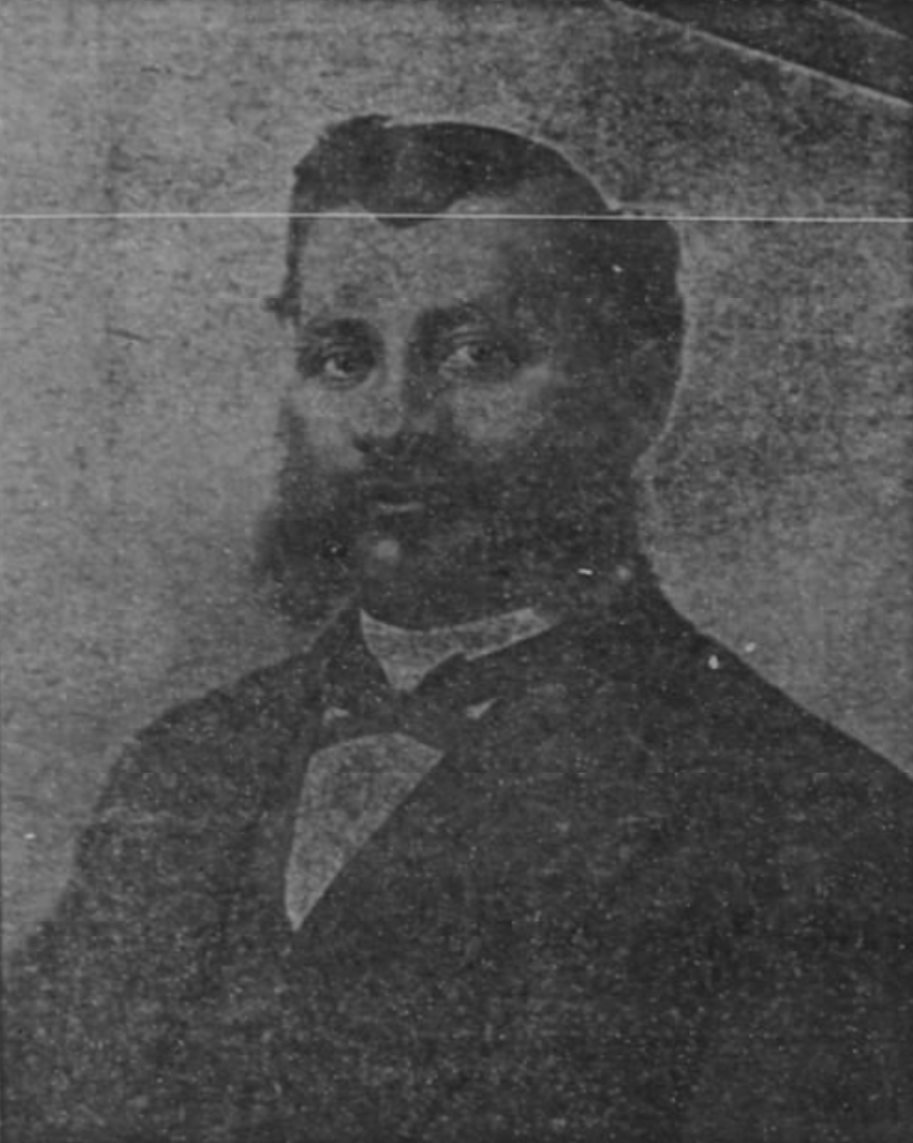

Member of the Mississippi House of Representatives from the Adams County district
- In office 1881–1894

Personal details
- Born: c. 1844 Charleston, South Carolina, U.S.
- Died: December 26, 1899 (aged 54–55)
- Spouse: Laura E. Davis (died 1899)
- Military career
- Allegiance: United States
- Branch: Union Army
- Conflicts: American Civil War

George F. Bowles (c. 1844 – December 26, 1899) was a lawyer, militia colonel, chief of police and state legislator in Mississippi.

== Early life, civil war and education ==
He was born in about 1844 in Charleston, South Carolina, as a slave. He became free before the American Civil War and was educated in South Carolina, Kentucky and Tennessee.

He enlisted in 1863 and served in the Union Army in the American Civil War. After the war ended he studied law and was admitted to the Tennessee bar.

== Mississippi ==
He moved to Natchez, Mississippi, in 1871 and was elected the following year to be the city attorney and the city weigher. He was admitted to The Mississippi Bar in 1875.

In 1878 Bowles was appointed as a colonel of the militia. He was elected as the chief of police in 1879.

He was elected to represent Adams County in the Mississippi House of Representatives from 1881 to 1894. He was a Republican. In 1888 he proposed that the office of Justice of the Peace be abolished as the city already had two magistrates and other staff with the jurisdiction to do the same task. Shortly after he proposed to repeal the Railroad Commission bill to save taxpayers money on the "useless" commission. He also authored a bill to establish a colored insane asylum. In December 1891 the election for the position of representative for Adams County was contested by Charles R. Byrnes against Bowles. Byrnes withdrew his contest on December 28, 1891, leaving Bowles as the Representative for Adams.

In 1891 he was elected as the president of the Mississippi Colored State Bar Association, it was the first colored state bar in America.

January 1892 he had the honor of being appointed to the Judiciary Committee a position that no other "colored man" had been appointed to since the Democrats gained control.

He was called to run again in 1895 to serve Adams County in the legislature but declined due to new interests to do with his private business.

He served on the School Board and had been a city marshal. He also was a large grocery merchant.

He had been an organiser of the Universal Brotherhood and was a prominent member of the Knights of Pythias and the Knights of Honor. He had been a grand chancellor of the Mississippi Knights of Pythias.

== Death ==
He died December 26, 1899, at his home. He lived at 13 St. Catherine, Natchez, as noted on a historic marker. His wife, Laura E. (née Davis), preceded him in death by a couple of months dying August 17, 1899. He died with no close relatives, so his will dispersed his estate to local friends and organisations.

== See also ==
- African American officeholders from the end of the Civil War until before 1900
