= 1912–1916 Mississippi Legislature =

←	1908–1912 Mississippi Legislature	1916–1920 Mississippi Legislature	→

Overview
- Legislative body: Mississippi Legislature
- Jurisdiction: Mississippi, United States
- Meeting place: Mississippi State Capitol
- Term: 2 January 1912 – January 1916
- Election: 1911 Mississippi elections

Mississippi State Senate
- Members: 45
- President: Theodore G. Bilbo
- President pro tempore: Albert C. Anderson
- Party control: Democratic

Mississippi House of Representatives
- Members: 133
- Speaker: H. M. Quin
- Party control: Democratic

Sessions
- 1st: 2 January 1912 – 16 March 1912
- 2nd: 10 June 1913 – 14 June 1913
- 3rd: 6 January 1914 – 28 March 1914

The 1912–1916 Mississippi Legislature met in three sessions between January 1912 and March 1914.

Elections were held on November 7, 1911. The term's first session, and the legislature's 83rd overall, met between January 2, 1912 and March 16, 1912. The term's second session, and the legislature's 84th overall, met between June 10, 1913 and June 14, 1913, and was a special session called for by Earl Brewer. The term's third and final session, and the legislature's 85th overall, met between January 6, 1914 and March 28, 1914. All legislators were Democrats.

== Senate ==
A. C. Anderson was elected President pro tempore of the Senate, defeating Carroll Kendrick and J. D. Donald in a 26-10-5 vote.

Officers of the Senate
Office	
President	Theodore G. Bilbo
President pro tem	A. C. Anderson
Secretary	J. W. T. Falkner Jr.
Assistant Secretary	H. E. King
Sergeant-at-Arms	E. M. Barber Jr.
Doorkeepers	W. H. Rees, J. J. Ellis
Postmistress	Madie Fitzgerald
Stenographers	Eugenia Davis, Bessie Winslow
Pages	John A. Bailey Jr., Graham Brady, Forrest B. Jackson, Frank Broyles Jr., W. V. Simmons

W. C. Martin and J. F. Guynes were sworn in during 1913. Polk Talbert was sworn in for the 1914 session.

1912 Mississippi State Senate
District	Counties	Senator Name	Residence
First	Hancock, Harrison, Jackson	A. W. Bond	Wiggins
Second	Wayne, Jones, Perry, Greene, Forrest	J. D. Donald	Hattiesburg
Third	Jasper, Clarke	J. D. Fatheree	Quitman
Fourth	Simpson, Covington, Marion, Pearl River, Lamar	M. U. Mounger	Collins
Fifth	Rankin, Smith	H. W. Bradshaw	Pelahatchie
Sixth	Pike, Franklin	Joseph E. Norwood	Magnolia
Seventh	Amite, Wilkinson	R. E. Jackson (1912–1913)	Liberty
Seventh	Amite, Wilkinson	Polk Talbert (1914)	
Eighth	Lincoln, Lawrence, Jefferson Davis	G. A. Hobbs	Brookhaven
Ninth	Adams	Richard F. Reed (1912)	Natchez
Ninth	Adams	W. C. Martin (1913–1914)	
Tenth	Claiborne, Jefferson	S. R. Young	Martin
Eleventh	Copiah	E. A. Rowan (1912)	Wesson
Eleventh	Copiah	Jasper Felix Guynes (1913–1914)	
Twelfth	Hinds, Warren	Clayton D. Potter	Jackson
Twelfth	Hinds, Warren	W. K. McLaurin	Vicksburg
Twelfth	Hinds, Warren	S. N. Collier	Vicksburg
Thirteenth	Scott, Newton	Dallas Stewart	Damascus
Fourteenth	Lauderdale	John A. Bailey	Bailey
Fifteenth	Kemper, Winston	H. C. Carter	Louisville (R. F. D. No. 1)
Sixteenth	Noxubee	Walter Price	Macon
Seventeenth	Leake, Neshoba	W. A. Ellis	Carthage
Eighteenth	Madison	C. B. Greaves	Flora
Nineteenth	Yazoo	T. H. Campbell	Yazoo City
Twentieth	Sharkey, Issaquena	W. H. Clements	Rolling Fork
Twenty-first	Holmes	H. H. Casteel	Pickens
Twenty-second	Attala	Wiley Sanders	Kosciusko
Twenty-third	Oktibbeha, Choctaw	H. H. Sikes	Starkville
Twenty-fourth	Clay, Webster	J. W. Spencer	Bellefontaine
Twenty-fifth	Lowndes	W. A. Love	Crawford
Twenty-sixth	Carroll, Montgomery	J. P. Taylor	Winona
Twenty-seventh	Leflore, Tallahatchie	Hall W. Sanders	Charleston
Twenty-eighth	Yalobusha, Grenada	J. W. Brown	Bryant
Twenty-ninth	Washington, Sunflower	Van B. Boddie	Greenville
Twenty-ninth	Washington, Sunflower	N. W. Sumrall	Belzoni
Thirtieth	Bolivar	J. C. Walker	Shaw
Thirty-first	Chickasaw, Calhoun, Pontotoc	Frank Burkitt	Okolona
Thirty-first	Chickasaw, Calhoun, Pontotoc	W. J. Evans	Calhoun City
Thirty-second	Lafayette	Lee Russell	Oxford
Thirty-third	Panola	A. S. Kyle	Batesville
Thirty-fourth	Coahoma, Tunica, Quitman	S. A. Withers	Austin
Thirty-fifth	DeSoto	Albert Myers Jr.	Byhalia (R. F. D.)
Thirty-sixth	Union, Tippah, Benton, Marshall, Tate	A. C. Anderson	Ripley
Thirty-sixth	Union, Tippah, Benton, Marshall, Tate	B. A. Tucker Jr.	Senatobia
Thirty-sixth	Union, Tippah, Benton, Marshall, Tate	John M. Eddins	Byhalia
Thirty-seventh	Tishomingo, Alcorn, Prentiss	Carroll Kendrick	Kendrick
Thirty-eighth	Monroe, Lee, Itawamba	H. F. Broyles	Greenwood Springs
Thirty-eighth	Monroe, Lee, Itawamba	J. S. Stephens	Marietta (R. F. D. No. 2)

== House ==
Hillrie M. Quin was unanimously elected Speaker.

Officers of the House
Office	Name
Speaker	H. M. Quin
Clerk	S. V. Robertson
Sergeant-at-Arms	J. H. O'Neal
Post Mistress	M. L. Turnage
Doorkeepers	H. T. Stovall and A. S. Payne
Stenographers	Jeannette Ratliff and May Seay
Pages	Evans Bull, Hugh Bailey, Lonnie Cook, Livesay Everett, John Owen, Pierre Robert, Archie Toler, Raymond Thompson, Verdo Webb

1912 Mississippi House of Representatives
County	Name	Postoffice
Adams	Winchester Jenkins	Natchez
Adams	Beekman Laub	Natchez
Alcorn	Sam M. Nabors	Corinth (R. F. D. No. 4)
Alcorn	R. B. Cotten	Corinth (R. F. D.)
Amite	E. B. Carter	Liberty (R. F. D. No. 3)
Amite	W. H. Griffin	Liberty (R. F. D. No. 3)
Attala	D. C. Bailey	Center
Attala	E. C. King	Kosciusko
Benton	W. E. Houston	Ashland
Bolivar	W. B. Parks	Merigold
Bolivar	H. E. Denton	Shelby
Calhoun	J. B. Going	Calhoun City
Calhoun	Dennis Murphree	Pittsboro
Carroll	L. S. Hemphill	Valley Hill
Carroll	C. W. West	McCarley
Chickasaw	Fred J. McDonald (1912-1913)	Okolona
Chickasaw	W. F. Buchanan (1914)	
Chickasaw	J. A. Lewis	Houston
Choctaw	C. A. Lindsey	Eupora
Claiborne	T. A. Luster	Utica (R. F. D. No. 2)
Clarke	Brownlee Harvey	Pachuta
Clay	J. L. Smith	West Point
Clay	W. H. Durham	Montpelier
Coahoma	O. G. Johnston	Friars Point
Coahoma	S. W. Glass (1912-1913)	Dublin
Coahoma	James F. Fontaine (1914)	
Copiah	John B. Mayes	Hazlehurst
Copiah	I. R. Martin	Utica (R. F. D. No. 7)
Copiah	W. C. Beacham	Wesson
Covington	J. W. Watson	Seminary
DeSoto	J. H. Simpson	Byhalia
DeSoto	J. W. Barbee Jr.	Hernando
Forrest	E. A. Anderson	Hattiesburg
Franklin	Moze H. Jones	Monroe
George	J. G. Rodgers	Howell
Greene	W. W. Walley	Richton (R. F. D. No. 1)
Grenada	S. A. Morrison	Grenada
Hancock	R. L. Genin	Bay St. Louis
Harrison	C. L. Rushing	Biloxi
Hinds	H. M. Quin	Jackson
Hinds	H. B. Gillespie	Raymond
Hinds	V. P. Ferguson	Learned
Holmes	T. G. Stevenson	Lexington
Holmes	R. W. Gulledge	Bowling Green
Holmes	R. A. Montgomery	Durant
Issaquena	R. E. Foster	Shiloh
Itawamba	B. M. Pearce	Dorsey
Jackson	W. D. McLeod	Moss Point
Jasper	J. W. White	Rose Hill
Jefferson	W. M. Darden	McNair
Jefferson Davis	J. F. Burrow	Carson
Jones	J. H. Bush	Laurel
Kemper	G. J. Rencher	DeKalb
Kemper	W. I. Milan	Preston
Lafayette	J. M. Sanders	Oxford (R. F. D. No. 1)
Lafayette	J. C. Eskridge	DeLay
Lamar	F. M. Whidden	Purvis
Lauderdale	J. D. Stennis	Meridian
Lauderdale	C. P. Walker	Meridian
Lauderdale	J. M. Harwell	Meridian
Lawrence	J. P. Conn	Topeka
Leake	W. L. Evans	Carthage
Lee	P. E. Carothers	Tupelo
Lee	J. S. Howerton	Tupelo
Leflore	D. P. Montgomery	Greenwood
Lincoln	Will D. Womack	Fair River
Lowndes	S. B. Johnston	Columbus
Lowndes	D. L. Ervin	Columbus
Lowndes	S. T. Pilkinton	Artesia
Madison	John M. Greaves	Livingston
Madison	J. B. Dendy	Cameron
Marion	E. H. Mounger (1912)	Columbia
Marion	John B. Dale (1913-1914)	
Marshall	George D. Myers	Holly Springs
Marshall	W. H. Sharp	Wall Hill
Marshall	Clarence Moore	Holly Springs
Monroe	B. N. Edens	Aberdeen (R. F. D. No. 4)
Monroe	D. H. Streetman	Smithville
Monroe	T. T. Davenport	Aberdeen
Montgomery	E. M. Thompson	Winona (R. F. D. No. 1)
Neshoba	G. E. Wilson	Philadelphia
Newton	N. M. Everett	Hickory
Newton	T. I. Doolittle	Newton
Noxubee	T. W. Brame	Macon
Noxubee	E. D. Cavett	Macon
Noxubee	H. A. Minor Jr.	Macon
Oktibbeha	C. B. Hannah	Sturgis
Oktibbeha	J. H. Wellborn	Starkville
Panola	H. W. Crenshaw	Crenshaw
Panola	W. R. Waldrop	Courtland (R. F. D.)
Panola	James Ruffin	Sardis
Pearl River	Leopold Locke	Poplarville
Perry	S. T. Garraway	Richton
Pike	M. G. Felder	Summit (R. F. D. No. 1)
Pike	W. S. Tate	Osyka (R. F. D. No. 1)
Pontotoc	C. C. Benefield	Walfield
Pontotoc	W. C. Pittman	Pontotoc
Prentiss	T. D. Rees	Booneville
Prentiss	H. C. Williams	Marietta
Quitman	W. T. Covington	Marks
Rankin	A. B. Stubblefield	Brandon
Rankin	Edgar Misterfeldt	Plains
Scott	H. H. Harper	Harperville
Sharkey	B. Goodman	Cary
Simpson	L. A. McCaskill	Magee
Smith	W. T. Simmons	Raleigh
Sunflower	Ed. Franklin	Ruleville
Tallahatchie	Jos. A. May	Sumner
Tate	J. C. Sheffield	Arkabutla
Tate	J. W. Crawford	Coldwater
Tippah	L. E. Childers	Dumas
Tishomingo	L. R. Neal	Tishomingo
Tunica	R. S. Alexander	Dundee
Union	S. Joe Owen	New Albany
Union	E. A. Brown	Etta
Warren	Moncure Dabney	Vicksburg
Warren	Sam Mackey	Vicksburg
Warren	B. E. Griffin	Oak Ridge
Washington	L. M. Nicholson	Percy
Washington	W. S. Watson	Greenville
Washington	H. C. Hamblen	Greenville
Wayne	J. V. Gandy	Waynesboro
Webster	D. A. Tabb	Walthall
Wilkinson	D. C. Bramlett	Woodville
Wilkinson	M. D. Johnson	Gloster (R. F. D. No. 1)
Winston	R. J. Boswell	Noxapater
Yalobusha	Jesse Coleman	Velma
Yalobusha	J. W. Meece	Water Valley
Yazoo	R. C. Langford	Yazoo City (R. F. D. No. 1)
Yazoo	N. A. Mott	Yazoo City
Yazoo	R. M. Rice	Bentonia (R. F. D. No. 1)

Floater Representatives
District / Counties	Name	Postoffice
Franklin and Lincoln	L. L. Magee	Brookhaven
Tippah and Benton	J. M. Talbot Jr.	Falkner
Claiborne and Jefferson	W. H. Torrey	Fayette
Clarke and Jasper	L. L. Denson	Bay Springs
Grenada and Montgomery	Edwin Boushe	Elliott
Leake and Winston	R. B. Denson	Harperville (R. F. D.)
Harrison and Jackson	F. M. Johnson	Ford
Lee and Itawamba	J. M. Spraddling	Tupelo
Yazoo and Hinds	W. E. Mallett	Jackson
