= 1908–1912 Mississippi Legislature =

←	1904–1908 Mississippi Legislature	1912–1916 Mississippi Legislature	→

Overview
- Legislative body: Mississippi Legislature
- Jurisdiction: Mississippi, United States
- Meeting place: Mississippi State Capitol
- Term: 7 January 1908 – 2 January 1912
- Election: 1907 Mississippi elections

Mississippi State Senate
- Members: 45
- President: Luther Manship
- President pro tempore: John Lawrence Hebron Jr.
- Party control: Democratic

Mississippi House of Representatives
- Members: 133
- Speaker: Hugh McQueen Street
- Party control: Democratic

Sessions
- 1st: 7 January 1908 – 21 March 1908
- 2nd: 4 January 1910 – 16 April 1910
- 3rd: 1 November 1911 – 15 November 1911

The 1908–1912 Mississippi Legislature met in three sessions between January 1908 and November 1911.

Elections were held on November 5, 1907. The first session of the term, and the Legislature's 80th overall, met between January 7, 1908 and March 21, 1908. The second session, and the Legislature's 81st overall, met between January 4, 1910 and April 16, 1910. The third and final session, and the legislature's 82nd overall, met from November 1, 1911, to November 15, 1911.

== Senate ==
As Lieutenant Governor of Mississippi, Luther Manship served ex officio as President of the Senate. John L. Hebron Jr. served as President pro tempore, elected over W. T. McDonald in a 30-11 vote. Frank Roberson served as Secretary, and L. F. Chiles served as Assistant Secretary. Several new senators were sworn in during 1910. Three senators died, and five resigned, between the 1910 and 1911 sessions, and their vacancies were not filled. All senators were Democrats.

1908 Mississippi State Senate
District	Counties	Senator Name	Residence
First	Hancock, Harrison, Jackson	W. T. McDonald	Bay St. Louis
Second	Wayne, Jones, Perry, Greene	W. W. West	Richton
Third	Jasper, Clarke	Sam Whitman (1908)	Bay Springs
Third	Jasper, Clarke	C. W. Thigpen (1910)	
Fourth	Simpson, Covington, Marion, Pearl River, Lamar	Theodore G. Bilbo	Poplarville
Fifth	Rankin, Smith	W. T. Simmons	Raleigh
Sixth	Pike, Franklin	M. C. McGehee	Little Springs
Seventh	Amite, Wilkinson	W. F. Tucker	Woodville
Eighth	Lincoln, Lawrence	F. M. Bush	New Hebron
Ninth	Adams	Charles F. Engle	Natchez
Tenth	Claiborne, Jefferson	J. S. Logan	Fayette
Eleventh	Copiah	E. A. Rowan	Wesson
Twelfth	Hinds, Warren	W. K. McLaurin	Vicksburg
Twelfth	Hinds, Warren	Clayton D. Potter	Jackson
Twelfth	Hinds, Warren	J. R. McDowell	Jackson
Thirteenth	Scott, Newton	G. H. Banks	Newton
Fourteenth	Lauderdale	John A. Bailey	Bailey
Fifteenth	Kemper, Winston	J. R. Key (1908, 1910)	Rio
Sixteenth	Noxubee	Walter Price	Prairie Point
Seventeenth	Leake, Neshoba	R. L. Breland	Philadelphia
Eighteenth	Madison	E. B. Harrell	Canton
Nineteenth	Yazoo	W. D. Gibbs	Bentonia
Twentieth	Sharkey, Issaquena	H. P. Farish	Mayersville
Twenty-first	Holmes	S. N. Sample (1908)	Ebenezer
Twenty-first	Holmes	W. A. Pierce (1910)	
Twenty-second	Attala	Wiley Sanders	Kosciusko
Twenty-third	Oktibbeha, Choctaw	J. Lem Seawright	Ackerman
Twenty-fourth	Clay, Webster	F. G. Barry (1908)	West Point
Twenty-fourth	Clay, Webster	Stacy Hibbler (1910)	
Twenty-fifth	Lowndes	M. A. Franklin	Columbus
Twenty-sixth	Carroll, Montgomery	Lee McMillan	Carrollton
Twenty-seventh	Leflore, Tallahatchie	R. V. Pollard	Greenwood
Twenty-eighth	Yalobusha, Grenada	F. H. Harper	Grenada
Twenty-ninth	Washington, Sunflower	J. L. Hebron	Greenville
Twenty-ninth	Washington, Sunflower	Thomas R. Baird (1908, 1910)	Indianola
Thirtieth	Bolivar	J. C. Burrus	Benoit
Thirty-first	Chickasaw, Calhoun, Pontotoc	C. E. Franklin	Pontotoc
Thirty-first	Chickasaw, Calhoun, Pontotoc	J. J. Adams	Pittsboro
Thirty-second	Lafayette	G. R. Hightower (Resigned Jan 25, 1908)	Oxford
Thirty-second	Lafayette	R. A. Dean	Not listed
Thirty-third	Panola	C. B. Vance	Batesville
Thirty-fourth	Coahoma, Tunica, Quitman	B. D. Simpson (1908, 1910)	Marks
Thirty-fifth	DeSoto	G. L. Darden	Hernando
Thirty-sixth	Union, Tippah, Benton, Marshall, Tate	W. J. East	Senatobia
Thirty-sixth	Union, Tippah, Benton, Marshall, Tate	Hugh K. Mahon	Holly Springs
Thirty-sixth	Union, Tippah, Benton, Marshall, Tate	S. Joe Owen	New Albany
Thirty-seventh	Tishomingo, Alcorn, Prentiss	J. A. Cunningham	Booneville
Thirty-eighth	Monroe, Lee, Itawamba	W. D. Anderson	Tupelo
Thirty-eighth	Monroe, Lee, Itawamba	G. J. Leftwich	Aberdeen

== House ==
All representatives were Democrats.

Officers of the House
Office	Name
Speaker	H. M. Street
Clerk	L. Pink Smith
Journal Clerk	Lee J. Wilson
Sergeant-at-Arms	W. E. Caffee
Postmistress	Annie Glass
Doorkeepers	U. H. Tompkins and W. R. Hoover
Stenographers	Madie Fitzgerald and Nettie Ratliff
Pages	Marvin Stainton, Holloway Bird, Jake Myers, Albert O. Mitchell, Lewis Whitson, Solon Dobbs, Edward Wright, Hoke Frazier, James K. Vardaman, Jr.

1908 Mississippi House of Representatives
County	Name	Postoffice
Adams (outside Natchez)	W. A. Killingsworth	Cannonsburg
Adams (Natchez)	Israel N. Moses	Natchez
Alcorn	S. M. Nabors	Rienzi
Alcorn	W. T. Bennett	Corinth
Amite	Eugene Gerald	Smithdale
Amite	Claude L. Fenn	Smithdale
Attala	D. C. Bailey	Ayres
Attala	J. J. Britt	Bolatusha
Benton	R. M. Frazier	Hickory Flat
Bolivar	C. R. Smith	Cleveland
Bolivar	George B. Shelby	Shelby
Calhoun	J. B. Going	Pittsboro
Calhoun	W. J. Patterson	Pittsboro
Carroll	T. O. Yewell	Carrollton
Carroll	S. S. Monday	North Carrollton
Chickasaw	Frank Burkitt	Okolona
Chickasaw	J. A. Lewis	Houston
Choctaw	C. A. Lindsey	Eupora
Claiborne	R. B. Anderson	Port Gibson
Clarke	A. Johnston	Shubuta
Clay	J. C. Bridges	Pheba
Clay	J. P. Valentine	Pheba
Coahoma	O. G. Johnston	Friars Point
Coahoma	W. A. Alcorn Jr.	Clarksdale
Copiah	C. E. Hood	Dentville
Copiah	W. W. Robertson	Wesson
Copiah	W. B. Miller	Hazlehurst
Covington	W. L. Cranford	Seminary
DeSoto	E. J. Pollard	Hernando
DeSoto	J. H. Simpson	Watson
Forrest	Stokes V. Robertson	Hattiesburg
Franklin	M. H. Jones	Little Springs
Greene	E. W. Breland	Leakesville
Grenada	S. A. Morrison	Grenada
Hancock	E. J. Gex	Bay St. Louis
Harrison	J. B. Clark	Nugent
Hinds	H. M. Quin	Jackson
Hinds	M. Ney Williams	Raymond
Hinds	S. A. D. Greaves	Asylum P. O.
Holmes	J. B. Mitchell	Goodman
Holmes	L. S. Rogers	West
Holmes	J. A. Dicken	Durant
Issaquena	L. Peyton	Mayersville
Itawamba	J. F. Dison	Eastman
Jackson	M. A. Dees	Scranton
Jasper	M. A. Lewis	Missionary
Jefferson Davis	J. O. Cowart	Prentiss
Jefferson	J. E. Lamb	Union Church
Jones	L. Stainton	Laurel
Kemper	G. J. Rencher	DeKalb
Kemper	S. M. Graham	Oak Grove
Lafayette	L. M. Russell	Oxford
Lafayette	C. E. Slough	Oxford
Lamar	J. L. Bryant	Baxterville
Lauderdale (Outside Meridian)	Joe D. Stennis	Bailey
Lauderdale (Whole County)	W. R. Denton	Hookston
Lauderdale (Meridian)	H. M. Street	Meridian
Lawrence	Lee H. Bird	Tryus
Leake	L. A. Zachry	Lena
Lee	George H. Hill, Jr.	Tupelo
Lee	F. A. Greene	Verona
Leflore	J. A. Tyson	Greenwood
Lincoln	M. McCullough	Brookhaven
Lowndes (East of Tombigbee)	T. A. Stinson	Columbus
Lowndes (East of Tombigbee)	B. G. Hull	Columbus (R. F. D. No. 3)
Lowndes (West of Tombigbee)	W. R. Moody	Columbus
Madison	R. W. Stewart	Madison
Madison	John B. Martin	Cameron
Marion	A. L. Yates	Columbia
Marshall	C. H. Curd	Holly Springs
Marshall	W. H. King	Tasca
Marshall	John Calhoon	Holly Springs
Monroe	H. F. Broyles	Greenwood Springs
Monroe	D. A. Beeks	Aberdeen (R. F. D. No. 2)
Monroe	T. R. Caldwell	Amory (R. F. D.)
Montgomery	Sid I. Robinson	Winona
Neshoba	A. D. Sharpe	Engine
Newton	J. D. Carr	Newton
Newton	M. P. Foy	Decatur
Noxubee	E. D. Cavett	Macon
Noxubee	M. O'Byrne	Macon
Noxubee	I. L. Dorroh	Macon
Oktibbeha (West)	N. Q. Adams	Sturges
Oktibbeha (East)	J. H. Wellborn	Starkville
Panola	W. E. Davis	Como
Panola	J. M. Cox	Batesville
Panola	L. C. Johnson	Reynolds
Pearl River	J. C. Shivers	Poplarville
Perry	D. K. McDonald	New Augusta
Pike	G. H. Alford	Magnolia
Pike	L. W. Felder	Felder's P. O.
Pontotoc	W. T. Stegall	Pontotoc
Pontotoc	J. I. Longest	Troy
Prentiss	W. A. White	Booneville
Prentiss	J. H. Gardner	Booneville
Quitman	J. B. Stone	Belen
Rankin	A. G. Norrell	Plain
Rankin	W. D. Heslep	Pelahatchie
Scott	Oliver McIlhenny	Forest
Sharkey	B. Goodman	Cary
Simpson	W. M. Lofton	Mendenhall
Smith	E. G. Robinson (1908)	Raleigh
Smith	J. J. Terry	Not listed
Sunflower	C. P. Adair	Indianola
Tate	Walker Wood	Senatobia
Tate	Herbert Holmes	Senatobia
Tallahatchie	John N. Sullivant	Teasdale
Tippah	S. O. Love	Ripley
Tishomingo	M. D. Adams	Iuka
Tunica	Charles Doherty	Tunica
Union	G. L. Jones	New Albany
Union	A. J. Jones	Myrtle
Warren	J. J. O'Neill	Vicksburg
Warren	T. R. Foster	Vicksburg
Warren	George R. Hawkins	Bovina
Washington	J. H. Nelms	Greenville
Washington	Van B. Boddie	Greenville
Washington	N. W. Sumrall	Belzoni
Wayne	E. W. Stewart	Waynesboro
Webster	T. R. Langston	Walthall
Wilkinson	W. J. Stockett	Woodville
Wilkinson	S. R. Jones	Centreville
Winston	O. A. Bennett	Louisville
Yalobusha	J. L. Harris	Water Valley
Yalobusha	J. R. Coleman	Velma
Yazoo	Will H. Hudson	Yazoo City
Yazoo	Theo. Schmidt	Yazoo City
Yazoo	C. J. Burrus	Yazoo City

Floater Representatives
District / Counties	Name	Postoffice	Notes
Franklin and Lincoln	R. E. Bennett	Meadville	
Tippah and Benton	A. C. Anderson	Ripley	
Claiborne and Jefferson	J. F. Frierson	Port Gibson	
Clarke and Jasper	J. D. Fatheree	Quitman	
Grenada and Montgomery	M. H. Allen	Winona	
Leake and Winston	W. B. Woodall	Noxapater	
Harrison and Jackson	Horace Bloomfield	Gulfport	
Yazoo and Hinds	Charles Perkins	Yazoo City	
Lee and Itawamba	W. S. Sheffield	Dorsey	
