= Robert Mayes =

Robert Mayes may refer to:

- Bobby Mayes (born 1967), English professional footballer
- Robert Burns Mayes (1867–1921), chief justice of Supreme Court of Mississippi
