= Senator Eskridge =

Senator Eskridge may refer to:

- Charles Vernon Eskridge (1833–1900), Kansas State Senate
- James C. Eskridge (1873–1949), Mississippi State Senate
