= Sydney M. Smith =

American judge (1869–1948)

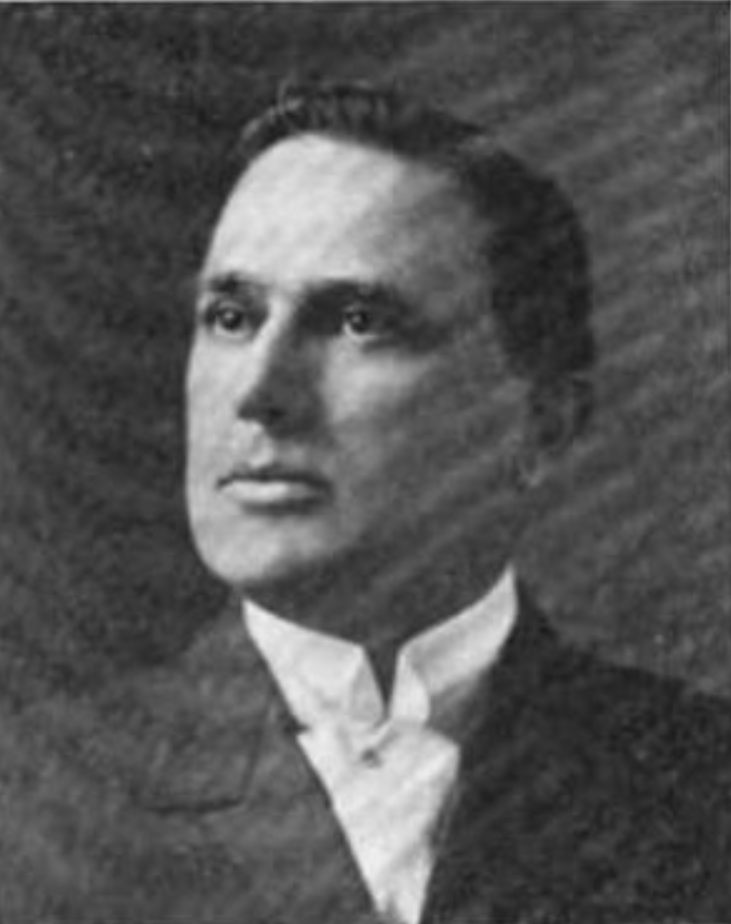
- Chief Justice Sydney M. Smith in 1923

Chief Justice of the Mississippi Supreme Court
- In office August 8, 1912 – July 24, 1948
- Preceded by: Robert Burns Mayes
- Succeeded by: Virgil A. Griffith

Associate Justice of the Mississippi Supreme Court
- In office February 25, 1909 – August 8, 1912
- Appointed by: Edmond Noel
- Preceded by: Robert Virgil Fletcher
- Succeeded by: Malcolm B. Montgomery

Personal details
- Born: April 9, 1869
- Died: July 24, 1948 (aged 79)
- Party: Democratic
- Spouse: Mattie Lee Smith
- Education: University of Mississippi (LL.B.)

Sydney McCain Smith (April 9, 1869 – July 24, 1948) was a justice of the Supreme Court of Mississippi from 1909 to 1948 and its chief justice starting in 1912. His 39-year tenure made him "by far the longest-serving Mississippi Supreme Court justice".

== Early life ==
Born in Lexington, Mississippi, Smith attended the public schools of that city. At the age of nineteen, he "became a bookkeeper at Ingleside, a large plantation on the Yazoo River", and "in his spare time, he read law books".

He attended the recently established Lexington Normal College in Holmes County, Mississippi from 1889 to 1891. He transferred to the University of Mississippi, from which he received an LL.B. in 1893. While there, he was a member of the fraternity of Delta Psi (aka St. Anthony Hall).

== Career ==
He entered the practice of law in Yazoo City, Mississippi, in July, 1893, returning to Lexington in February 1894. He was elected to the Mississippi House of Representatives from Holmes County, Mississippi, in 1899, and re-elected on November 3, 1903, thereafter serving until 1906.

In 1906, Governor James K. Vardaman appointed Smith to a seat on the Mississippi Fourth Circuit Court. On February 25, 1909 Governor Edmond Noel announced Smith's elevation to a seat on the state supreme court.

Smith became Chief Justice under the prevailing rules of the court, when he became the senior judge on the court upon the resignation of Robert Burns Mayes on August 8, 1912. This made Smith the youngest chief justice to serve to that point. In 1914 and 1915, Smith also served as president of the Mississippi State Bar Association. By 1916, with Smith's encouragement, the Constitution of Mississippi was amended to make state supreme court positions elected, and Smith ran for an eight-year term on the court. He was opposed in the Democratic primary by former Governor Andrew H. Longino, but Longino's relatively late entry into the campaign neutralized any advantage that he may have gained from Smith's inability to campaign early due to the obligations of his position. On August 15, 1916, Smith defeated Longino in the primary by a vote of 10,886 to 8,323. With no Republican opponent in the general election, this sealed Smith's victory for winning the term.

Smith was reelected without opposition in 1924, and handily defeated opponents who challenged his reelection bids in 1932 and 1940. Over the course of this service, he was the author of "roughly eighteen hundred opinions", including a noted 1943 wartime dissent from an opinion upholding a conviction for "disloyalty" under a statute that Smith found to be overly broad.

== Personal life and death ==
On April 9, 1896, Smith married Mattie Lee Smith, of Crystal Springs, Mississippi, the daughter of James C. and Matilda Smith. They had no children. Mattie Lee Smith died in 1947.

Smith had a heart attack in July 1946, and thereafter remained in fragile health until he died two years later, at the age of 79.

Political offices
Preceded by Robert Virgil Fletcher	Justice of the Supreme Court of Mississippi; 1909–1948	Succeeded by Malcolm B. Montgomery
Preceded by Robert Burns Mayes	Chief Justice of the Supreme Court of Mississippi; 1912–1948	Succeeded by Virgil A. Griffith
