= L. K. Altwood =

American politician, lawyer, minister and teacher

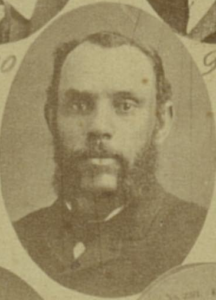
- Born: December 15, 1850; Alabama
- Died: January 8, 1929 (aged 78); Jackson, Mississippi
- Occupation(s): American politician, lawyer, minister and teacher

Louis Kossuth Atwood, also documented as L. K. Attwood (December 15, 1850 - January 8, 1929) was a lawyer, bank founder and president, minister, teacher and state legislator in Mississippi.

== Early life and education ==
He was born December 15, 1850, in Alabama to slave parents. When he was 18 months old, he was sold at a slave auction; his mother bought him and took him away to Ohio.

Altwood obtained both his primary and secondary education at Ripley, Ohio. He was an 1874 Bachelor of Arts graduate of Lincoln University in Pennsylvania. Altwood was also ordained as a Presbyterian minister while at university.

== Career ==
After graduating he moved to Bolton, Mississippi, where he started working as a school teacher and then later in commerce.

He studied law and was admitted to The Mississippi Bar in 1879 before starting up a law practice in Bolton.

He founded the fraternal insurance company the Sons and Daughters of Jacob of America in 1883 which he ran until his death.

Altwood served two terms in the Mississippi House of Representatives from: 1880 to 1881 and from 1884 to 1885 representing Hinds County as a Republican. He was also appointed a United States internal revenue collector, until 1899, and was a delegate to several Republican National Conventions.

He helped found Southern Bank in Jackson and served as its president. In 1908 he was president of the Mississippi Negro Bankers Association.

== Death ==
He died in Jackson, Mississippi on January 8, 1929 (as reported by his grave) or January 7 as reported in the newspaper obituary that described him as "one of Mississippi's greatest negro citizens". He was survived by his widow of 49 years Maggie Beatrice Welborne; one son, Dr. Mollison Atwood; and three daughters: Hertycena Dickson, Ollive McKissack and Mary Millsaps.

== See also ==
- African American officeholders from the end of the Civil War until before 1900
