= Thelma Stevens =

American religious and civil rights leader (1902–1990)

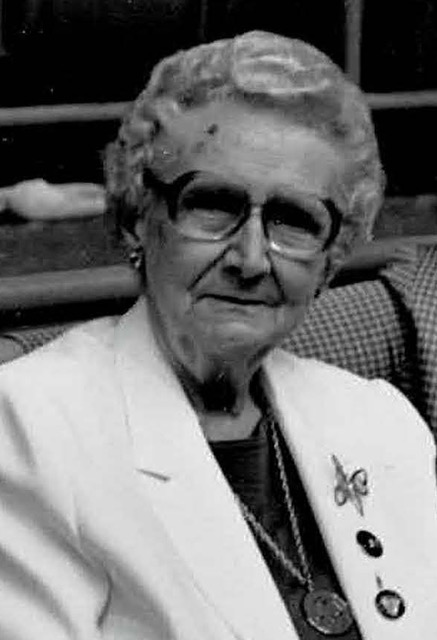
- Thelma Stevens UMCGC 1984
- Born: 1902; Montgomery County, Mississippi, U.S.
- Died: 1990 (aged 87–88); Asheville, North Carolina, U.S.
- Employer: The Women's Division of the Methodist Church
- Known for: Racial justice activism

Thelma Stevens (1902–1990) was a Methodist advocate for social and racial justice. From a young age, she dedicated herself to studying and working in favor of integration and racial equality in the United States. From her early career as a teacher in rural Mississippi, to her position as Director of the Bethlehem Center in Augusta, Georgia, to her work in the Woman's Division of The Methodist Church, Stevens contributed to the Civil Rights Movement.

== Early life ==
Thelma Stevens was born to Ben and Ida Stevens in 1902 in Montgomery County, Mississippi. She described her family as consisting of white sharecroppers. The youngest of nine, three of Stevens' siblings died before she was born. When she was six years old, her mother died and her father remarried. At age ten, following the death of her father, she went to live with her sister in Slate Springs, Mississippi, whose husband pastored a Methodist Episcopal Church, South.

After graduating high school in 1919, Stevens passed a county teaching exam and taught high school in Kemper County, Mississippi for three years. During that time, a group of high school students that Stevens coached in basketball tricked Stevens into taking a bus ride with them to witness a lynching. This formative experience when Stevens was nineteen years of age prompted her involvement in racial justice activism.

== Education ==
In 1922, Thelma Stevens was offered a scholarship at the State Teachers College (now University of Southern Mississippi at Hattiesburg). During this time, she angered the college president by inviting Black teachers to discussion sessions with white teachers. After graduating in 1925, she had a yearlong tenure teaching at a junior college in Perkinston, Mississippi, where she worked closely with Black teachers to secure resources for underfunded school programs. While Stevens was initially interested in working with the YWCA because of the organization's commitment to racial justice initiatives, a recruiter at the Methodist Board of Missions in Nashville persuaded her to attend Scarritt College for Christian Workers in Nashville, Tennessee through a scholarship. Built with funds raised by the Women's Missionary Societies of the Methodist Episcopal Church South, Scarritt primarily trained social workers, deaconesses, and Methodist missionaries. Stevens graduated from Scarritt in 1928.

== Career ==
=== Early Career (1928–1939) ===
Before Thelma Stevens graduated from Scarritt, the Methodist Church evaluated her and told her she was not healthy enough for church work. Stevens accepted a teaching position in Hampton, Tennessee.

Before Stevens signed her Tennessee teaching contract, the Methodists changed their evaluation of her and offered her a position as the Director of the Bethlehem Center in Augusta, Georgia. The Bethlehem Center, founded in 1911 by the Women's Missionary Council of the Methodist Episcopal Church, South, was one of the oldest community centers for African-Americans in the United States. The Methodist Church asked Stevens to conduct research to determine the type of new facility the Bethlehem Center should build. After a year in Augusta, Stevens proposed moving the center to a more centralized location and building a gym for children.

The Bethlehem Center housed a kindergarten and a weekly Bible school. The center also served as a meeting place for women's clubs and classes, and acted as a gathering place for local ministers. Eventually, the Center bought a piece of land, built a camp, served the African American rural community, and ran the only gymnasium for the Black community in Georgia. Stevens worked at the Bethlehem Center from 1928 to 1939.

=== Christian Social Relations Department of the Woman's Division (1939–1968) ===
In 1938, Stevens was asked to be the Superintendent of Christian Social Relations and Local Church Activities, one of the three major departments of the Women's Missionary Council of the Methodist Episcopal Church, South. The woman who held the position at the time was planning to retire before the Methodist Church, the Methodist Episcopal Church, and the Methodist Episcopal Church, South merged to become the Methodist Church. In 1939, Stevens accepted the position, moved to New York, and became the senior executive staff of the newly combined Christian Social Relations Department of the Woman's Division of the Methodist Church.

Stevens' work with the Woman's Division challenged her assumption that the Church was irrelevant to racial justice work. Through her work, she "interpreted racial equality and its meaning for Christian life to Methodist women". The Woman's Division raised their own funds rather than relying on the Methodist Church for funding, and therefore could enact more progressive policies and practices than were in place in the Methodist Church at large. In her position, Stevens worked closely with the General Board of Christian Social Concerns and the president of the Woman's Division (Sadie Wilson Tillman) to create the Church Center for the United Nations in New York City, which was built in 1963 and financed by the Woman's Division. The Church Center collaborated with women's groups around the world in support of universal human rights.

== Advocacy for Racial Justice ==
Thelma Stevens grew up witnessing the horrific conditions of a prison farm down the road from her home. She participated in the YWCA as a student for their work for racial equality, and she hoped to work for the organization in the field of racial justice.

While at the State Teachers College, Stevens took part in a YWCA group that invited Black teachers to speak about their experiences and hardships. Later, she was chastised by the president of the college, who said he was not recruiting "Yankee teachers". He commanded them to never let another Black person come onto campus to meet with school teachers. In response, Stevens moved the evening program to meet the Black teachers at their local schools.

While she doubted the church's commitment and relevance in antiracism conversations, she made a career of advocating for racial equality and interpreting its meaning in the Woman's Division of The Methodist Church. In 1938, Stevens organized the first interracial conference for Methodist women, held at Paine College, a Methodist-supported HBCU in Augusta, Georgia.

Stevens was relentless in her pursuit of racial equality and integration. The Woman's Missionary Council of the Methodist Episcopal Church, South went on record in 1939 to oppose the creation of the Central Jurisdiction, a conference created to formalize segregation when the Methodist Episcopal Church, Methodist Episcopal Church South, and Methodist Protestant Church merged to become The Methodist Church. In 1944, Stevens continued the activism of the Woman's Missionary Council by taking the floor at the Methodist General Conference and demanding that meetings take place in locations that hosted Black people as well as white people. While she was laughed at in this meeting, the Woman's Division was the first branch of the Methodist Church to formally call for the abolition of the racially-segregated Central Jurisdiction in 1948.

Also in 1948, Stevens hired Pauli Murray to research and gather information concerning states' laws on race and color and city ordinances (primarily known as Jim Crow Laws) and create a pamphlet that could be distributed to Methodist institutions and governing agencies. In late 1949, Murray presented the research to the Woman's Division. Rather than writing a pamphlet, Murray had written four volumes on state laws around race. Murray's compilation was published by the Woman's Division in 1951 as States' Laws on Race and Color, a text which was used in the Brown v. Board of Education Supreme Court decision. Thurgood Marshall called States' Laws on Race and Color "The Bible" for civil rights legislation. States' Laws on Race and Color contributed to a later publication entitled "Charter for Racial Justice in an Interdependent Global Community," which The United Methodist General Conference adopted as denominational policy in 1980.

Additionally, Stevens drafted a Charter for Racial Policies to desegregate the Woman's Division, which the division adopted in 1952. She followed this up by writing a broader Charter in 1962 requiring the elimination of discrimination within the entire Methodist Church, which was adopted by the General Conference in 1964.

== Death ==
At the end of her life, Thelma Stevens lived at Brooks-Howell Home, a retirement community founded to care for UMC deaconesses and missionaries in Asheville, North Carolina. She died in Asheville on December 18, 1990, due to complications from a stroke. She left behind no immediate family. Stevens is remembered fondly for her racial justice work.

== Writings ==
- 1978: Legacy for the Future: The History of Christian Social Relations in Women's Division of Christian Services 1940-1968. ASIN B0006CZMLO
