= Jeff Truly =

American judge (1861–1946)

Associate Justice of the Supreme Court of Mississippi
- In office August 15, 1903 – August 10, 1906
- Preceded by: J. H. Price
- Succeeded by: Robert Burns Mayes

Member of the Mississippi House of Representatives from the Jefferson County district
- In office January 1886 – January 1888 Serving with J. P. Wise
- Preceded by: W. L. Harper; L. L. Applewhite
- Succeeded by: J. S. Hicks; J. J. Whitney

Personal details
- Born: July 21, 1861 Fayette, Mississippi, U.S.
- Died: August 25, 1946 (aged 85) Fayette, Mississippi, U.S.
- Party: Democratic
- Spouse: Mattie Whitney (m. 1889-1946, his death)
- Children: 5

Jeff Truly (July 21, 1861 – August 25, 1946) was an American jurist and Democratic politician. He was a justice of the Supreme Court of Mississippi from 1903 to 1906, and a member of the Mississippi House of Representatives in 1886.

== Early life ==
Jeff Truly was born on July 21, 1861, in Fayette, Mississippi, the son of Confederate Army veteran Richard Harrison Truly and his wife, Mary (Key) Truly. His siblings included a brother named Numa V. (died 1950) and a sister named Eva (1868 or 1869–1947) who later married Joseph Withers Power, the Secretary of State of Mississippi from 1901 to 1926. Truly attended Lusher's Private Academy in New Orleans, Louisiana, before attending A. D. Campbell's school in Natchez, Mississippi, in 1875. He then read law, first in the office of J. J. Whitney in 1877 and 1878, and then in the office of Steele & Garrett (in St. Joseph, Louisiana) in 1879. Continuing his legal education, he took a law course at Tulane University in 1880.

== Career ==
Truly began practicing law in Jefferson County, Mississippi, in November 1883. As a member of the Democratic Party, he represented Jefferson County as in the Mississippi House of Representatives in the 1886 session. In December 1898, Governor Anselm J, McLaurin appointed Truly to the office of Circuit Judge of Mississippi's Sixth Judicial District. Governor McLaurin re-appointed him to this office in February 1902.

=== Supreme Court of Mississippi ===
Mississippi Supreme Court Associate Justice J. H. Price resigned in August 1903. On August 15, 1903, Mississippi Governor Andrew H. Longino appointed Truly to finish the term. Truly holds the distinction of having delivered the first judicial opinion in the new Mississippi State Capitol. While on the Court, Truly handed down decisions on cases including Postal Telegraph Cable Co. v. Wells; J. J. Harper v. State; Revenue Agent v. Kuykendall; and New Orleans and Northeastern R. R. v. A. H. George & Co.

Truly's term would expire on August 10, 1906. At the end of Truly's term, Robert Burns Mayes was appointed to replace him.

=== Later career ===
Between c.1896 and until about 1908, Truly was a trustee of Alcorn A & M College. In 1932, Truly was elected to the office of President of the Mississippi State Bar Association.

== Personal life and death ==
Truly was a Presbyterian. He married Mattie Whitney on October 23, 1889, in Fayette, Mississippi. They had five children; Everette Geoffrey; Richard Marion; Marjorie; Thelma; and Errick H., who became a lieutenant colonel. Truly died after a long illness at 4 AM on August 25, 1946, in Fayette, Mississippi, and was survived by his widow, his brother Numa, his sister Eva, his three sons, and his two daughters. His funeral service was held at 5 PM the same day.

Political offices
Preceded by J. H. Price	Justice of the Supreme Court of Mississippi; 1903–1906	Succeeded by Robert Burns Mayes
