= Fred B. Smith =

American politician (1892–1984)

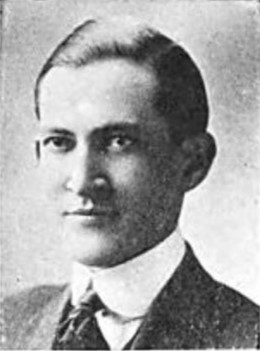
- c. 1923

President pro tempore of the Mississippi State Senate
- In office January 1922 – January 1924
- Preceded by: John Fatheree
- Succeeded by: Mark Perrin Lowrey Love

Member of the Mississippi State Senate from the 36th district
- In office January 1920 – January 1924 Serving with William J. East; Franklin P. Boatner

Member of the Mississippi House of Representatives from the Tippah and Benton Counties district
- In office January 1916 – January 1920

Personal details
- Born: May 14, 1892 Tippah County, Mississippi, U.S.
- Died: November 12, 1984 (aged 92) Ripley, Mississippi, U.S.
- Party: Democratic

Frederick Brougher Smith (May 14, 1892 – November 12, 1984) was an American politician. He served in both houses of the Mississippi Legislature, and was the President pro tempore of the Mississippi State Senate in 1922.

== Early life ==
Frederick Brougher Smith was born on May 14, 1892, on his father's plantation near Ripley, Mississippi. He was the son of planter Robert Bruce Smith Jr. and his wife, Fannie (Palmer) Smith. Frederick was a great-nephew of Mississippi Secretary of State C. A. Brougher. Frederick attended the schools of Tippah County, Mississippi. He then attended the Mississippi Heights Academy, graduating in 1908. He then attended Millsaps College, graduating with a B.S. degree in 1912. He attended the University of Mississippi for two years after that. He was the Editor-in-Chief of the university yearbook in 1914, when he graduated with a L.L.B. degree.

== Career ==
In November 1915, Smith was elected to represent Tippah and Benton Counties in the Mississippi House of Representatives for the 1916–1920 term. He served in the following committees during this term: Drainage; Judiciary; Immigration & Labor; Railroads; and Insurance.

In 1919, Smith was elected to the Mississippi State Senate as one of the three 36th District senators for the 1920–1924 term. During this term, Smith chaired the Senate's Corporations Committee and was a member of the following Senate committees: Constitution; Judiciary; Railroads & Franchises; and Humane & Benevolent Institutions. During the 1922 session, Smith was elected to the office of President pro tempore of the Senate.

In 1925, Smith founded the Bank of Ripley. He was a onetime president of the bank and was a member of the board of directors until his death. From 1956 to 1957, Smith was the President of the Mississippi Economic Council.

In 1975, the Ole Miss Hall of Fame presented Smith with the Distinguished Alumnus Award. In 1976, the Mississippi State Bar Association gave Smith the Lawyer-Citizen Award.

Smith died after a long illness on November 12, 1984, at the Tippah County Hospital in Ripley, Mississippi.

== Personal life ==
Smith was a member and onetime board member of the First United Methodist Church of Ripley. He was also a Freemason. Smith was married to Elizabeth. They had one daughter named Onie Frances (Smith) Fortier.
