= R. P. Willing Jr. =

American politician

Member of the Mississippi Senate from the 11th district
- In office January 1894 – January 1896
- Preceded by: Robert Burns Mayes
- Succeeded by: Elias Alford Rowan

Personal details
- Born: October 8, 1863
- Died: May 15, 1913 (aged 49) Jackson, Mississippi

Robert Patton Willing Jr. (October 8, 1863 - May 15, 1913) was a Democratic member of the Mississippi Senate, representing the 11th district (Copiah County), from 1894 to 1896.

== Biography ==
Robert Patton Willing, Junior, was born on October 8, 1863. He graduated from the University of Mississippi in 1883. He was admitted to the bar in 1887. In 1893, he was nominated by the Democratic Party to succeed the resigning R. B. Mayes to represent the 11th district in the Mississippi Senate. In a special election on December 14, 1893, he defeated Populist candidate W. M. Keithley for the Senate position. He served in the 1894 session of the Senate. He died on May 15, 1913, in his home in Jackson, Mississippi.
