= Frances Joseph-Gaudet =

American educator, social worker and prison reformer

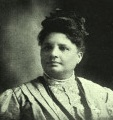
- Born: 1861; Holmesville, Mississippi
- Died: December 1934 (aged 72-72); Chicago, Illinois
- Honored in: Episcopal Church
- Feast: 30 December
- Philanthropist, prison reformer, education reform

Frances Joseph-Gaudet (1861 – December 1934) was an American educator, social worker and prison reformer, honored as a saint in the Episcopal Church.

== Early and family life ==
Born in a cabin in Holmesville, Pike County, Mississippi during the American Civil War to a mother of Native American descent and an enslaved father, Frances was raised by her grandparents.

Many people from New Orleans used to summer in Holmesville, and as a teenager Gaudet went to New Orleans to live with her brother and attend Straight College. She married at age 17, but after 10 years of marriage, Joseph-Gaudet petitioned for a divorce on grounds of her husband's alcoholism. Thus, the young mother had three children to raise alone.

== Career ==
Although supporting herself and her children as a seamstress, the young mother dedicated her life to social work and prison reform. She worked with the Prison Reform Association, becoming a major activist in prison and education reform at the turn of the century. In 1894, Joseph-Gaudet started holding prayer meetings for black prisoners. She helped in any way she could, writing and delivering letters, and found them clothing. She later extended this ministry to white prisoners as well.

Her dedication to the imprisoned and to penal reform won Joseph-Gaudet the respect of prison officials, city authorities, the Governor of Louisiana, and the Prison Reform Association. In 1900 she became a delegate to the Women’s Christian Temperance Union international convention in Edinburgh, Scotland. Upon returning, Joseph-Gaudet began attending sessions of the new juvenile court in New Orleans and taking responsibility for young offenders, especially young blacks arrested for a misdemeanor or vagrancy.

Her home proving too small for her efforts to assist homeless children, Joseph-Gaudet raised $5000 and purchased a farm on Gentilly Road and in 1902 founded the Colored Normal and Industrial School, which eventually encompassed 105 acres and numerous buildings. The facility served as an orphanage, as well as a boarding school for children with working mothers, with Gaudet as principal. In 1919 Gaudet donated the facility to the Episcopal Diocese of Louisiana, which renamed it to honor her, as well as adding Rev. Taylor of St. Luke's Church as chaplain. Joseph-Gaudet continued to serve as the principal for an additional two years.

In 1913, Joseph-Gaudet published her autobiography He Leadeth Me.

== Death and legacy ==
Joseph-Gaudet spent the last years of her life in Chicago, Illinois, where she died. Episcopal Social Services in New Orleans honors her legacy, and continues to award annual scholarships in her memory. The school Gaudet founded closed in the 1950s, but reorganized in 1954 as the Gaudet Episcopal Home (serving African American children ages 4–16), only to in turn close in 1966, when the land was sold and the proceeds used to fund the scholarships mentioned above. Furthermore, her home parish in New Orleans, St. Luke's Episcopal Church (New Orleans' historic black church, founded 1855) also honors her memory by naming a hall in its Community Center. Since 2006, the Episcopal Church has recognized Joseph-Gaudet's life and service with a feast day on December 30 (sometimes celebrated on December 31).
