= Graham House (Rose Hill, Jasper County, Mississippi) =

- U.S. National Register of Historic Places
- Location within Mississippi
- Nearest city: Rose Hill, Mississippi
- Coordinates: 32°07′44″N 88°59′28″W
- Area: 3 acres (1.2 ha)
- Built by: Narcissus Daniel Graham
- Architectural style: Greek Revival
- NRHP reference No.: 08000265
- Added to NRHP: April 10, 2008

The Graham House was a historic one-and-a-half-story cottage in Rose Hill, Mississippi. It was built in the 1860s by Narcissus Daniel Graham, a farmer who lived here with his second wife, née Mary Josephine Spencer. Graham began building the house prior to the American Civil War of 1861–1865, and it was completed after the war. It was designed in the Greek Revival style. It was listed on the National Register of Historic Places on April 10, 2008.
