= Rose Hill, Jasper County, Mississippi =

Rose Hill, Mississippi
- Unincorporated community
- Location within Mississippi Location within the United States
- Coordinates: 32°08′41″N 88°59′45″W
- Country: United States
- State: Mississippi
- County: Jasper
- Elevation: 381 ft (116 m)
- Time zone: UTC-6 (Central (CST))
  - Summer (DST): UTC-5 (CDT)
- ZIP code: 39356
- Area codes: 601 & 769
- GNIS feature ID: 676843

Rose Hill is an unincorporated community in Jasper County, Mississippi, United States. Its ZIP code is 39356.

== History ==
Rose Hill was named by early settlers for the wild roses that grew in the surrounding area.

The community was formerly home to a normal school known as the Rose Hill Normal Institute.

A post office first began operating under the name Rose Hill in 1888.

The Graham House, once located in Rose Hill, was listed on the National Register of Historic Places until it was destroyed by a tornado in April 2011.

== Notable people ==
- John W. White, member of the Mississippi Senate from 1916 to 1920
- Thomas Daniel Young, English professor and academic
