= Archibald McBryde =

American politician

Archibald McBryde (September 28, 1766 – February 15, 1837) was a Scottish-born American politician who was a U.S. representative from North Carolina's 7th congressional district.

== Biography ==
He was born in Wigtownshire, Scotland to James McBryde (1737 – 1783) and Janet McMiken McBryde (1736 – 1814). He immigrated in 1775 with his parents and siblings and settled in Carbonton, North Carolina aboard the ship Jackie (formerly the Stanraer).

McBryde studied under private teachers and later studied law. He was admitted to the bar and served as clerk of the superior court of Moore County between 1792 and 1816. He had previously served as the deputy clerk of Moore County between 1790 and 1792, and as justice of the peace of Moore County between 1792 and 1808. McBryde was elected as a Federalist to the Eleventh and Twelfth Congresses (March 4, 1809 – March 3, 1813). During his terms he joined other North Carolinians in opposition to James Madison's foreign trade policies and voted against the declaration of war against Great Britain prior to the War of 1812. He was later elected as a senator of the North Carolina General Assembly in 1813 and 1814.

After office, McBryde resumed his law practice until he died in 1837 in Carbonton and was interred in Farrar Cemetery. McBryde's death date is often given as February 1836. However, records from the NC Supreme Court indicate he was alive in September 1836. An 1841 statement written by McBryde's wife supports a February 1837 death date, as well.

== Personal life and family ==
McBryde married Lydia Ramsey (1777 – 1861), daughter of Colonel John Ambrose Ramsey, who was then the county clerk of Chatham County, and Sarah Elizabeth Birdsong, in 1796. Archibald and Lydia had ten children who survived infancy.

- Janette, 5 November 1799 – 23 June 1824 (age 24), married William Hayes.
- Nancy Ann, 4 October 1801 – 25 December 1862 (age 61), first married Reverend Kenneth McIver, later married and has issue with Green Womack, son of John Womack who served in the North Carolina legislature as a representative from Caswell County.
- Mary Nancy, 18 June 1803 – 5 July 1857 (age 54), married first Benjamin Williams, son of Benjamin Williams who served as the 11th and 14th Governor of North Carolina, later married Dr. Charles Chalmers.
- James, born 1805, never married.
- Eliza Winslow, 8 April 1808 – 9 July 1869 (age 61), first married Dr. Archibald McQueen, later married and had issue with John Pemberton DeJarnette.
- Frances, born 1809, married William Pickett DeJarnette.
- Archibald W "Archie" McBryde Jr, 16 June 1812 – 19 November 1874 (age 62), married Julia Holmes, daughter of Gabriel Holmes who served as the 21st Governor of North Carolina and was also the father of Confederate Lieutenant General Theophilus H. Holmes.
- Lydia, 19 December 1813 – 7 December 1866 (age 52), married Donald Street, their son Hugh McQueen Street served in the Mississippi House of Representatives. Donald's uncle Hugh McQueen served as the Attorney General of North Carolina.
- Sarah Tyson, 24 March 1817 – 21 April 1884 (age 67), married James Alston.
- William Martin, 3 April 1819 – 1878 (age 59), married Sarah Francis Grigsby.

Following McBryde's death, his widow and some of their children relocated to Madison County, Tennessee where his daughter Nancy Ann was living with her husband Green Womack.

McBryde and his family also owned numerous slaves. These enslaved peoples numbered at least seven at the time of his wife Lydia's death in 1861, three of which being willed to Archibald McBryde Jr. and the other four being willed to William Martin McBryde.

McBryde was a Presbyterian.

U.S. House of Representatives
Preceded by John Culpepper	Member of the U.S. House of Representatives from North Carolina's 7th congressional district 1809–1813	Succeeded by John Culpepper
