= Albert Brown Guynes =

American politician (1848–1919)

Member of the Mississippi House of Representatives from the Copiah County district
- In office January 1928 – April 19, 1929
- In office January 1892 – January 1896
- Preceded by: J. F. Sexton; T. J. Millsaps
- In office January 1882 – January 1886 Serving with George S. Dodds (1882-1884); E. A. Rowan (1884-1886)
- Preceded by: J. W. Buffkin; T. W. McNeill
- Succeeded by: E. A. Rowan; T. J. Millsaps

Personal details
- Born: June 10, 1848 Copiah County, MS
- Died: April 19, 1929 (aged 80)
- Party: Democrat
- Children: Jasper Felix Guynes

Albert Brown Guynes (June 10, 1848 – April 19, 1929) was an American politician. He was a member of the Mississippi House of Representatives, representing Copiah County, from 1882 to 1886, from 1892 to 1896, and from 1928 to his death.

== Biography ==
Albert Brown Guynes was born on June 10, 1848, near Georgetown, Copiah County, Mississippi. He was the son of Henry Hall Guynes and Mary (Finley) Guynes. He fought for the Confederacy in the Civil War. He represented Copiah County in the Mississippi House of Representatives from 1882 to 1886. He then served in the Mississippi Constitutional Convention of 1890. He then continued serving in the House from 1892 to 1896. He was re-elected to the House in 1927 for the 1928–1932 term. He was the oldest member of the 1928-1932 legislature and its only Confederate veteran. Guynes served in the 1928 session, but then died in office. He died on April 19, 1929, at age 81.

== Personal life ==
Guynes was married to Emma Jane Ramsey. Their son, Jasper Felix, was born in 1875. Jasper served in the Mississippi House of Representatives and also was a Mississippi Circuit Court judge.
