= John Culpepper =

American politician

John Culpepper (c. 1761 – January 1841) was an American politician who was a Federalist U.S. representative from North Carolina.

== Origins ==
John Culpepper was born about 1761 near Wadesboro, Anson County, Province of North Carolina, the son of Sampson Culpepper (1737 Bertie County, Province of North Carolina – 1820 Wilkinson County, Georgia) and Eleanor Gilbert (April 25, 1745, Norfolk County, Virginia Colony – July 19, 1823, Wilkinson County, Georgia). John Culpeper of Albemarle, leader of Culpeper's Rebellion in 1677, was Culpepper's third great uncle.

Culpepper attended the public schools; became a minister and pastored Rocky River Baptist Church for fifty years; Under the authority of the Third North Carolina General Assembly during the American Revolution, Montgomery County, North Carolina was formed in 1779 from a portion of Anson County. Culpepper was to later represent U.S. Congressional Districts that contained both counties. District boundaries have been redefined each decade in the year following each national census since the 1790 census.

== Political career ==
Culpepper presented credentials as a Federalist Member-elect to the Tenth Congress and served from March 4, 1807, until January 2, 1808, when the seat was declared vacant as the result of a contest on account of alleged irregularities; subsequently reelected to fill the vacancy declared by the House of Representatives and served from February 23, 1808, to March 3, 1809. He was deemed a man of sound sense, but not brilliant, useful rather than showy.

Culpepper was elected as a Federalist to the Thirteenth and Fourteenth Congresses (March 4, 1813 – March 3, 1817); unsuccessful candidate for reelection in 1816 to the Fifteenth Congress; elected as a Federalist to the Sixteenth Congress (March 4, 1819 – March 3, 1821); unsuccessful candidate for reelection in 1820 to the Seventeenth Congress; elected as an Adams-Clay Federalist to the Eighteenth Congress (March 4, 1823 – March 3, 1825); unsuccessful candidate for reelection in 1824 to the Nineteenth Congress; elected as an Adams to the Twentieth Congress (March 4, 1827 – March 3, 1829); declined to be candidate for reelection in 1828 and retired from public life.

== Marriage and Progeny ==
Culpepper married and had children, including:

- John Alexander Culpeper (December 9, 1800, Anson County, North Carolina, United States of America – March 26, 1873, Darlington County, South Carolina, US); became a pastor. His first wife was "Let." (Leticia?) Russell. He secondly married Catherine Pinkney (December 8, 1807, North Carolina, US – December 11, 1883, Society Hill, Darlington County, South Carolina, US). His children included:
  - Dr. James Furman Culpeper (July 11, 1834, Anson County, North Carolina, US – June 24, 1917, Timmonsville, Florence County, South Carolina, US). His son by his first wife "Let." Russell. Captain of Culpepper's South Carolina Battery (SC 3rd Palmetto Battalion, Light Artillery Company C) during the American Civil War, thereafter a medical doctor for 50 years.
  - A. Fuller Culpeper (June 28, 1843, Darlington County, North Carolina – c. 1900 Dade County, Florida). His son by either his first or second wife. Fuller through battlefield promotions eventually became a lieutenant in his elder brother's light artillery battery.
  - Charles M Culpeper (May 23, 1845, Darlington County, North Carolina – May 9, 1860 (aged 14)). Son by his second wife Catherine Pinkney.
- Evan Alexander Culpepper Sr. (March 17, 1808, Anson County, North Carolina, United States of America – June 10, 1884, Coryell County, Texas, United States of America); had issue.

== Death ==
Culpepper died at the residence of his son in Darlington County, South Carolina in January 1841; interment in the cemetery at Society Hill, South Carolina.

== See also ==
- Tenth United States Congress
- Thirteenth United States Congress
- Fourteenth United States Congress
- Sixteenth United States Congress
- Eighteenth United States Congress
- Twentieth United States Congress

U.S. House of Representatives
| Preceded by Duncan McFarlan | Member of the U.S. House of Representatives from North Carolina's 7th congressional district 1807-1809 | Succeeded by Archibald McBryde |
| Preceded by Archibald McBryde | Member of the U.S. House of Representatives from North Carolina's 7th congressional district 1813-1817 | Succeeded by James Stewart |
| Preceded by James Stewart | Member of the U.S. House of Representatives from North Carolina's 7th congressional district 1819-1821 | Succeeded by Archibald McNeill |
| Preceded by Archibald McNeill | Member of the U.S. House of Representatives from North Carolina's 7th congressional district 1823-1825 | Succeeded by Archibald McNeill |
| Preceded by Archibald McNeill | Member of the U.S. House of Representatives from North Carolina's 7th congressional district 1827-1829 | Succeeded by Edmund Deberry |
