= James S. Madison =

Mississippi politician

44th Speaker of the Mississippi House of Representatives
- In office January 1890 – January 1892
- Preceded by: Charles B. Mitchell
- Succeeded by: Hugh McQueen Street

Member of the Mississippi House of Representatives from the Noxubee County district
- In office January 1886 – December 25, 1892 Serving with 1890-1892: T. J. O'Neil, C. M. Thomas; 1888-1890: J. L. Clemens, C. M. Thomas; 1886-1888: J. L. Clemens, J. A. Nicholson
- Preceded by: A. W. Simpson; J. L. Clemens; A. J. Boswell

Personal details
- Born: March 26, 1846 Marengo County, AL
- Died: December 25, 1892 (aged 46)
- Party: Democratic
- Spouse: Nettie Carpenter (m. 1876)
- Children: 6

James S. Madison (March 26, 1846 – December 25, 1892) was an American politician and planter. He was the 44th Speaker of the Mississippi House of Representatives, serving from 1890 to 1892.

== Early life ==
James S. Madison was born on March 26, 1846, in Marengo County, Alabama. He was one of ten children of L. W. Madison and his wife, Frances Delilah (Tucker) Madison. James's brother, John E. Madison, would serve in the Mississippi Legislature in 1880. When James was a child, he moved with his parents to Mississippi, first to Lowndes County and then to Noxubee County. James attended only the common schools. During the Civil War, Madison served in the Confederate Army. He became a planter and was able to acquire considerable amount of property.

== Political career ==
Madison was a member of the Democratic Party. After the end of Reconstruction, Madison was elected to the position of the Justice of the Peace of his district. In 1885, he was elected to represent Noxubee County in the Mississippi House of Representatives for the 1886-1888 term. He was re-elected in 1887 for the 1888-1890 term. He was re-elected again in 1889 for the 1890-1892 term. At the start of that term in January 1890, Madison was chosen by acclamation to be the Speaker of the House. Madison was, also by acclamation, recommended to be a delegate to Mississippi's Constitutional Convention of 1890, but circumstances prevented him from attending. Madison was re-elected to the House in 1891 for the 1892-1894 term. He died in office of an illness on December 25, 1892.

=== Legislation ===
In 1888, Madison authored a bill that granted relief to certain Confederate Civil War veterans living in Mississippi. In addition, Madison authored a bill that required chancery clerks to keep ledger accounts against each officer in the state. He also authored a bill that assessed the lands in each county, and a bill that made it a misdemeanor to not pay poll taxes.

== Personal life and family ==
Madison married Nettie Carpenter in 1876. They had six children, five of whom survived James when he died. By 1891, Madison weighed 320 pounds.
