= Thomas Daniel Young =

American academic

- Born: October 22, 1919; Louisville, Mississippi, U.S.
- Died: January 29, 1997 (aged 77); Bay Springs, Mississippi, U.S.
- Education: University of Southern Mississippi; University of Mississippi; Vanderbilt University
- Occupation: University professor
- Known for: Scholar of Southern literature
- Spouse: Arlease Lewis
- Children: 3 sons

Thomas Daniel Young (October 22, 1919 – January 29, 1997) was an American academic. He was the first Gertrude C. Vanderbilt professor of English at Vanderbilt University, and the author or editor of a dozen books about the literature of the Southern United States.

== Early life ==
Young was born on October 22, 1919, in Louisville, Mississippi.

Young graduated from the University of Southern Mississippi, where he earned a bachelor's degree. He took a break from his studies to serve in the United States Army Air Forces during World War II. He subsequently earned a master's degree from the University of Mississippi, followed by a PhD from Vanderbilt University in 1950.

== Career ==
Young began his career at his alma mater, the University of Southern Mississippi, where he taught Southern and American Literature from 1950 to 1957, followed by Delta State University from 1957 to 1961, where he was also a dean. He became an English professor at Vanderbilt professor at 1961, and he was the chair of its English department from 1967 to 1973. He was awarded the first Gertrude C. Vanderbilt professorship from 1972, and he was the director of the Vanderbilt-in-England program at the University of Leeds in 1972-1973. He retired from Vanderbilt University in 1985.

Young was the author and editor of a dozen books about Southern literature. He wrote a biography of John Crowe Ransom, and edited books about John Peale Bishop, Malcolm Cowley, Andrew Nelson Lytle and Allen Tate. He also authored his memoir. In 1991, Mark Royden Winchell co-edited a volume of essays about his scholarly contributions.

== Personal life and death ==
Young married Arlease Lewis. They had three sons, Thomas D. Young Jr., Terry Lewis Young, and Kyle David Young. They resided in Rose Hill, Jasper County, Mississippi.

Young died on January 29, 1997, in Bay Springs, Mississippi. His funeral was held at the Homewood United Methodist Church in Rose Hill, Mississippi, and he was buried in the Twistwood Cemetery.

== Selected works ==
- Beatty, Richmond C.; Young, Thomas D.; Watkins, Floyd C. (1968). The Literature of the South. Glenview, Illinois: Scott, Foresman. OCLC 613223832.
- Young, Thomas D. (1976). Gentleman in a Dustcoat: A Biography of John Crowe Ransom. Baton Rouge, Louisiana: Louisiana State University Press. ISBN 9780807101902. OCLC 787841443.
- Young, Thomas D. (1981). Tennessee Writers. Knoxville, Tennessee: University of Tennessee Press. ISBN 9780870493195. OCLC 7276903.
- Hindle, John J.; Young, Thomas D., eds. (1985). The Republic of Letters in America: The Correspondence of John Peale Bishop & Allen Tate. Lexington, Kentucky: University Press of Kentucky. ISBN 9780813165004. OCLC 973053092.
- Cowley, Malcolm; Young, Thomas D., eds. (1986). Conversations With Malcolm Cowley. Jackson, Mississippi: University Press of Mississippi. ISBN 9780878052905. OCLC 246716470.
- Sarcone, Elizabeth; Young, Thomas Daniel, eds. (1987). The Lytle-Tate Letters The Correspondence of Andrew Lytle and Allen Tate. Jackson, Mississippi: University Press of Mississippi. ISBN 9780878053261. OCLC 875455967.
- Young, Thomas D. (1988). Fabulous Provinces: A Memoir. Jackson, Mississippi: University Press of Mississippi. ISBN 9780585275048. OCLC 45732564.
