= J. J. Adams =

Former Mississippi politician

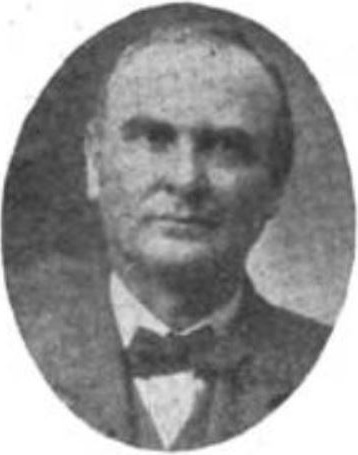
- c. 1908

Member of the Mississippi State Senate from the 31st district
- In office January 1908 – January 1912 Serving with Charles E. Franklin
- Preceded by: Charles E. Franklin; James Gordon
- Succeeded by: Frank Burkitt; W. J. Evans

Personal details
- Born: May 17, 1860 Slate Springs, Mississippi, U.S.
- Died: November 6, 1935 (aged 75)
- Party: Democratic

John Jefferson Adams (May 17, 1860 - November 6, 1935) was an American lawyer, merchant, and Democratic politician. He represented the 31st District in the Mississippi State Senate from 1908 to 1912.

== Early life ==
John Jefferson Adams was born on May 17, 1860, in Slate Springs, Mississippi. He was the son of James Jefferson Adams and Mary (Burson) Adams. James Adams fought for the Confederate Army in the Civil War, in which he died on September 4, 1862. John attended the country schools of Calhoun County, Mississippi, before studying at home. Adams became a merchant and served as the Mayor of Bellefontaine, Mississippi. In 1896, Adams enrolled in the Cumberland School of Law, and graduated the following year. He was admitted to the bar in 1896. In 1898, Adams attended the University of Mississippi. By 1909 he was a member of the Mississippi State Bar Association.

In 1899, Adams moved to Pittsboro, Mississippi, where he began to practice law in addition to his merchant practice. In Pittsboro, Adams served on the town's Board of Aldermen. Starting in 1900, Adams served on the Democratic Executive Committee of Webster County, Mississippi, and he was its Secretary since 1902. From 1903 onwards, Adams was also on the Democratic Executive Committee of Mississippi's 4th Congressional District. On November 5, 1907, Adams was one of two people elected to represent the 31st District (consisting of Chickasaw, Calhoun, and Pontotoc Counties) in the Mississippi State Senate for the 1908-1912 term. During this term, Adams served on multiple committees: Constitution; Local & Private Legislation; Immigration; Public Lands; and Pensions.

Adams died on November 6, 1935. He was buried in the North Union Cemetery in Bellefontaine, Mississippi.

== Personal life ==
Adams was a Baptist. He was a member of the Freemasons, the Knights of Pythias, and the Woodmen of the World. Adams married Mary Masouri McCain on January 4, 1882. They had three children, named James J. Adams, Virgie (Adams) Cruthirds, and Mary Z. Adams.
