= Myron S. McNeil =

American politician

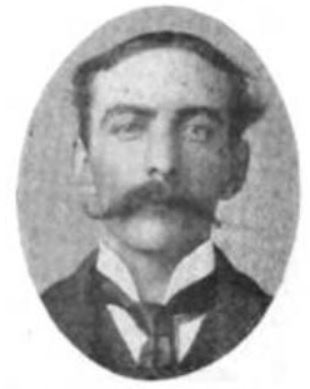
- c. 1904

Member of the Mississippi Senate from the 11th district
- In office January 1904 – January 1908
- Preceded by: Elias A. Rowan
- Succeeded by: Elias A. Rowan

Personal details
- Born: September 28, 1873 Crystal Springs, MS
- Died: September 1944 (aged 70–71)
- Party: Democrat
- Education: Millsaps College

Myron Sibbie McNeil (September 28, 1873 - buried October 1, 1944) was a Democratic Mississippi State Senator, representing the 11th District, from 1904 to 1908.

== Early life and education ==
Myron Sibbie McNeil was born on September 28, 1873, in Crystal Springs, Mississippi. He was the son of Jarrot Wesley McNeil and Lucy (Bob) McNeil. His ancestors came from Scotland. He was educated in Crystal Springs elementary schools. He received a B. S. from Lexington Normal College. He also graduated from the Millsaps College law school, where he received a Bachelor of Laws degree.

== Career ==
He was admitted to the bar in 1898 and began practicing law thereafter. He was nominated to represent the 11th district, composed of Copiah County, as a Democrat, in the Mississippi State Senate in August 1903 for the 1904–08 term, and was elected in November 1903. Afterwards, he continued practicing law as an attorney in Hazlehurst. He died of a heart attack in September 1844, and he was buried in Hazlehurst on October 1, 1944.

== Personal life ==
McNeil was a Methodist. On July 6, 1904, he married Deborah Martin. They had at least 1 child together, a daughter, who survived Deborah when she died in 1949.
