= M. A. Franklin =

American politician

Member of the Mississippi State Senate from the 25th district
- In office January 5, 1904 – January 2, 1912
- Preceded by: Samuel M. Meek
- Succeeded by: W. A. Love

Member of the Mississippi House of Representatives from the Lowndes County district
- In office January 7, 1896 – January 5, 1904

Personal details
- Born: December 1, 1862 Columbus, Mississippi, U. S.
- Died: September 15, 1928 (aged 65) Columbus, Mississippi, U. S.
- Party: Democratic

Malcolm Argyle Franklin (December 1, 1862 - September 15, 1928) was an American politician. He represented the 25th District in the Mississippi State Senate from 1904 to 1912, and represented Lowndes County in the Mississippi House of Representatives from 1896 to 1904.

== Early life ==
Malcolm Argyle Franklin was born on December 1, 1862, in Columbus, Mississippi. He was the son of Sidney Smith Franklin and Ann Eliza (Campbell) Franklin. Franklin attended the primary schools of Columbus.

== Career ==
Franklin was involved in merchandising and was also a planter. In 1895, he was elected to represent Lowndes County as a Democrat in the Mississippi House of Representatives for the 1896-1900 term. Franklin was re-elected to the House in 1899 for the 1900-1904 term. On November 3, 1903, Franklin was elected to represent the 25th District (Lowndes County) in the Mississippi State Senate for the 1904-1908 term. During this term, Franklin served on the following committees: Finance; Banks & Banking; Penitentiary & Prisons; Insurance; and Joint Committee Universities and Colleges. In 1905, Franklin was heavily considered as a candidate for Lieutenant Governor. On November 5, 1907, Franklin was re-elected to the Senate for the 1908-1912 term. During this term, Franklin chaired the University & Colleges committee, and also served on the following committees: Finance; Railroads & Franchises; Insurance; and Humane & Benevolent Institutions.

On June 27, 1914, President Woodrow Wilson appointed Franklin to the office of Collector of Customs at Honolulu. In 1917, Franklin was considered a potential candidate for territorial governor of Hawaii. Due to the incoming Harding administration and change of parties, Franklin resigned from his collectorship in May 1921 and returned to Mississippi. Malcolm died in Columbus on September 15, 1928.

== Political views ==
Franklin supported state education appropriations. He was "instrumental" in getting funds for the Mississippi State Industrial Institute and College for young women.

== Personal life ==
Franklin was a Baptist. He was also a member of the Freemasons. He never married.
