= Holmesville, Mississippi =

Unincorporated community in Mississippi, US

- Unincorporated community
- Location within Mississippi Location within the United States
- Coordinates: 31°12′13″N 90°18′31″W
- Country: United States
- State: Mississippi
- County: Pike
- Elevation: 299 ft (91 m)
- Time zone: UTC-6 (Central (CST))
  - Summer (DST): UTC-5 (CDT)
- GNIS feature ID: 671358

Holmesville is an Unincorporated community in Pike County, Mississippi, United States.

It is located on the west bank of the Bogue Chitto, approximately 11 mi (18 km) southeast of McComb.

== History ==
Holmesville was named December 11, 1816 in honor of Major Andrew Hunter Holmes by commissioners who were appointed to select a spot for the seat of justice in the geographical center of the newly formed Pike County. This was the center of trade and business for the county for many years. In 1857 the Illinois Central Railroad was built 9 mi (14 km) west bypassing Holmesville and the more populated area of the County. This shifted the population from the river town of Holmesville to the new railroad towns of Magnolia, Summit, and Osyka. In 1873, Magnolia was voted in as the new county seat and in 1876 a new courthouse was erected. In 1881, the newly built courthouse was destroyed by fire, and most records of Holmesville and Pike County were lost. Within 20 years, most businesses moved out of Holmesville and the people followed. An effort was made to maintain the buildings in Holmesville, but one by one they were torn down or left to decay. Few old structures remain.

In January, 1816, J.Y. McNabb was elected clerk of the Inferior and Superior Courts, and David Cleveland was elected sheriff, and they entered into bond on the 29th day of January, 1816. In August, 1817, Laban Bacot was sheriff, under the new State regime. In the fall election of 1818, Henry Quin was elected clerk and Laban Bacot sheriff.

Holmesville became a resort, and through the summer months was often crowded with people seeking rest and relief from the unhealthful atmosphere of New Orleans and the dangers of cholera and yellow fever which often prevailed there. Its healthfulness, picturesque scenery, pure water, facilities for outdoor sports and quiet pleasures, made it a desirable place for a summer vacation.

== Notable people ==
- Frances Joseph-Gaudet, educator, social worker, and prison reformer
- Hillrie M. Quin, speaker of the Mississippi House of Representatives from 1912 to 1916
