= Robert Burns Mayes =

American jurist and state senator

Chief Justice of the Supreme Court of Mississippi
- In office April 16, 1910 – August 8, 1912
- Preceded by: Albert H. Whitfield
- Succeeded by: Sydney M. Smith

Associate Justice of the Supreme Court of Mississippi
- In office May 10, 1906 – April 16, 1910

Member of the Mississippi State Senate from the 11th district
- In office January 1892 – January 1894
- Preceded by: J. L. Turnage; J. C. Burdine
- Succeeded by: R. P. Willing Jr.

Personal details
- Born: June 28, 1867 Gallatin, Mississippi, U.S.
- Died: February 18, 1921 (aged 53) Jackson, Mississippi, U.S.
- Party: Democratic
- Children: 1

Robert Burns Mayes (June 28, 1867 – February 18, 1921) was an American jurist. He was a state senator and justice of the Supreme Court of Mississippi from 1906 to 1912.

== Early life ==
Robert Burns Mayes was born on June 28, 1867, in Gallatin, Mississippi. He was the son of Herman Bowman Mayes, a prominent lawyer, and Charity (Barlow) Mayes. Mayes attended the public schools of Hazlehurst, Mississippi. He then studied law at the University of Mississippi, graduating with a bachelor's degree in 1888. He began practicing law in 1890.

== Career ==
In 1891, Mayes was elected to represent the 11th District as a Democrat in the Mississippi State Senate for the 1892-1896 term. In 1893, he was made a special agent of the United States Department of the Treasury and worked in this position until 1895. Mayes then moved to New York City, and practiced law before returning to Hazlehurst three years later. In 1900, Mayes was appointed to be the Chancellor of Mississippi's 5th Chancery District by Governor Andrew H. Longino; Mayes was re-appointed by Governor James K. Vardaman in 1904, and served until 1906. On May 10, 1906, Mayes was appointed to replace Jeff Truly as an associate justice of the Supreme Court of Mississippi. After the resignation of Chief Justice Albert H. Whitfield, Mayes became the Court's new chief justice on April 16, 1910. Mayes resigned from the Court on August 8, 1912, to return to private practice. He then joined the law firm known as Mayes & Mayes. He also became a district counsel for the Illinois Central Railroad and the Yazoo & Mississippi Valley Railroad. He was the President of the Mississippi State Bar Association from 1913 to 1914.

== Personal life and death ==
Mayes was a Methodist, and he was also a member of the Knights of Pythias. He married Annie Lanier in 1892, and they had one son, named John Lanier Mayes. He then married Leila Hart Beatty on February 23, 1900. After Leila's death, Mayes married for a third time to Malvina Yerger in May 1920. Mayes died from complications from surgery at 6 PM on February 18, 1921, in Jackson, Mississippi.

Political offices
Preceded by Jeff Truly	Justice of the Supreme Court of Mississippi; 1906–1912	Succeeded by Richard F. Reed
