= Archibald McNeill =

American politician

Archibald McNeill (died 1838) was a U.S. representative from North Carolina; born in Cumberland County, North Carolina; represented Moore County, North Carolina in the State House of Commons in 1808 and 1809 and in the State Senate in 1811 and 1815; elected to the Seventeenth Congress (March 4, 1821 – March 3, 1823); elected to the Nineteenth Congress (March 4, 1825 – March 3, 1827). He then moved to Marshall County, Mississippi, in 1835 or 1836, where he died in 1838.

== See also ==
- Seventeenth United States Congress
- Nineteenth United States Congress

U.S. House of Representatives
Preceded by John Culpepper	Member of the U.S. House of Representatives from North Carolina's 7th congressional district 1821-1823	Succeeded by John Culpepper
Preceded by John Culpepper	Member of the U.S. House of Representatives from North Carolina's 7th congressional district 1825-1827	Succeeded by John Culpepper
