= J. H. Price =

American judge (1861–1947)

James H. Price (August 26, 1861 – March 24, 1947) was a justice of the Supreme Court of Mississippi from March to August 1903.

He was a Sigma Chi fraternity brother, and a member of the Mississippi State Bar Association.

He lived in Magnolia, Mississippi and was co-counsel for governor Lee M. Russell when the governor was sued over whether he met the qualifications to hold office.

Political offices
Preceded by Samuel H. Terral	Justice of the Supreme Court of Mississippi; 1903–1903	Succeeded by Jeff Truly
