= Pittsboro, Mississippi =

- Village
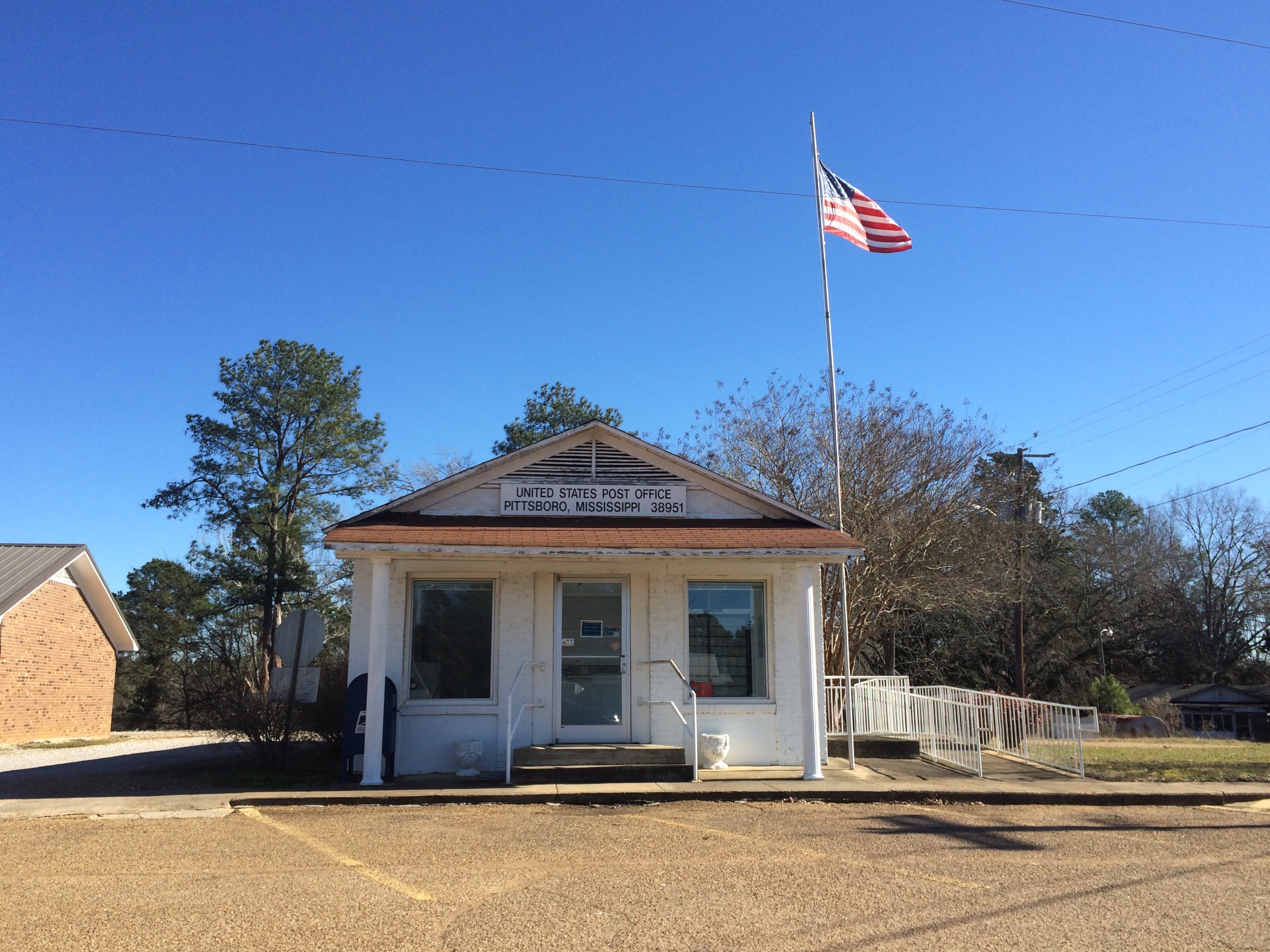
- US Post Office in Pittsboro

- Flag

- Location of Pittsboro, Mississippi
- Coordinates: 33°56′19″N 89°20′19″W
- Country: United States
- State: Mississippi
- County: Calhoun

Area
  - Total: 0.98 sq mi (2.54 km^{2})
  - Land: 0.98 sq mi (2.54 km^{2})
  - Water: 0 sq mi (0.00 km^{2})
- Elevation: 390 ft (119 m)

Population (2020)
  - Total: 157
  - Density: 160.0/sq mi (61.77/km^{2})
- Time zone: UTC-6 (Central (CST))
  - Summer (DST): UTC-5 (CDT)
- ZIP code: 38951
- Area code: 662
- FIPS code: 28-58360
- GNIS feature ID: 0690930

Pittsboro is a village in and the county seat of Calhoun County, Mississippi, United States. As of the 2020 census, Pittsboro had a population of 157.

== Geography ==
Pittsboro is located near the center of Calhoun County at 33°56′19″N 89°20′19″W (33.938595, -89.338735). Mississippi Highway 9 passes through the village, leading south 6 miles (10 km) to Calhoun City and north 4 miles (6 km) to Bruce.

According to the United States Census Bureau, the village has a total area of 0.97 square miles (2.5 km^{2}), all land.

== Demographics ==
Historical population
| Census | Pop. | Note | %± |
|---|---|---|---|
| 1870 | 186 | | — |
| 1880 | 206 | | 10.8% |
| 1900 | 254 | | — |
| 1910 | 249 | | −2.0% |
| 1920 | 252 | | 1.2% |
| 1930 | 249 | | −1.2% |
| 1940 | 276 | | 10.8% |
| 1950 | 246 | | −10.9% |
| 1960 | 205 | | −16.7% |
| 1970 | 188 | | −8.3% |
| 1980 | 269 | | 43.1% |
| 1990 | 277 | | 3.0% |
| 2000 | 212 | | −23.5% |
| 2010 | 202 | | −4.7% |
| 2020 | 157 | | −22.3% |
U.S. Decennial Census

As of the census of 2000, there were 212 people, 70 households, and 48 families residing in the village. The population density was 214.1 inhabitants per square mile (82.7/km^{2}). There were 83 housing units at an average density of 83.8 per square mile (32.4/km^{2}). The racial makeup of the village was 76.89% White, 21.23% African American, 0.47% from other races, and 1.42% from two or more races. Hispanic or Latino of any race were 1.42% of the population.

There were 70 households, out of which 35.7% had children under the age of 18 living with them, 51.4% were married couples living together, 14.3% had a female householder with no husband present, and 31.4% were non-families. 30.0% of all households were made up of individuals, and 15.7% had someone living alone who was 65 years of age or older. The average household size was 2.56 and the average family size was 3.23.

In the village, the population was spread out, with 22.6% under the age of 18, 9.4% from 18 to 24, 33.5% from 25 to 44, 18.9% from 45 to 64, and 15.6% who were 65 years of age or older. The median age was 36 years. For every 100 females, there were 118.6 males. For every 100 females age 18 and over, there were 121.6 males.

The median income for a household in the village was $46,250, and the median income for a family was $49,028. Males had a median income of $37,500 versus $21,250 for females. The per capita income for the village was $13,975. None of the families and 1.1% of the population were living below the poverty line.

== Education ==
Pittsboro is served by the Calhoun County School District.

Calhoun Academy is a local private school.

== Notable people ==
- J. J. Adams, member of the Mississippi State Senate from 1908 to 1912
- John Going, member of the Mississippi House of Representatives from 1908 to 1920 and 1940 to 1948
- Jack Knight, professional baseball player
- Ike Knox, college athlete at Ole Miss and surgeon
- Dennis Murphree, governor (1927–1928) and (1943–1944) and lieutenant governor (1924–1927, 1932–1936, and 1940–1943), born and died in Pittsboro
