= Charles B. Mitchell =

American politician

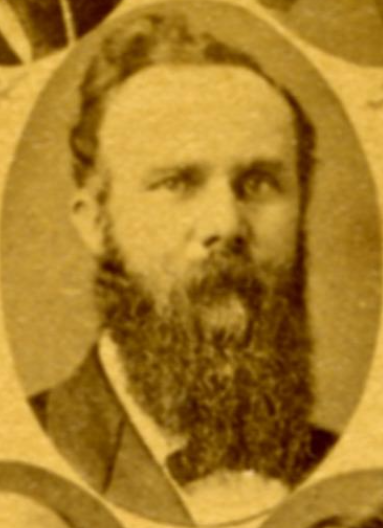
- c. 1882

Speaker of the Mississippi House of Representatives
- In office January 1888 – January 1890
- Preceded by: Jacob H. Sharp
- Succeeded by: James S. Madison

Member of the Mississippi Senate from the 31st district 20th (1882–1886)
- In office January 1896 – March 3, 1899
- In office January 1882 – January 1886
- Preceded by: W. L. Lorance
- Succeeded by: William T. Houston

Member of the Mississippi House of Representatives from the Pontotoc County district
- In office January 1894 – January 1896
- In office 1870–1871 Serving with S. H. Wood
- Preceded by: J. L. Morphis; J. M. Burton; B. F. McWhorter
- Succeeded by: C. R. Wharton

Personal details
- Born: April 20, 1842 Kentucky, U.S.
- Died: March 3, 1899 (aged 56) Pontotoc, Mississippi, U.S.
- Party: Democratic
- Children: 10

Charles B. Mitchell (April 20, 1842 - March 3, 1899) was an American politician. He served in both houses of the Mississippi Legislature and was the Speaker of the Mississippi House of Representatives from 1888 to 1890.

== Biography ==
Charles B. Mitchell was born in Kentucky on April 20, 1842. He was the son of Dr. Charles G. Mitchell, a physician and plantation owner. In his youth, Charles B. Mitchell moved with his parents to Pontotoc County, Mississippi, where his father owned a plantation. Mitchell attended a college in Murfreesboro, Tennessee. When the Civil War began, Mitchell set aside his studies and enlisted in the Confederate Army. He was shortly discharged due to a physical disability, but later rejoined and served until the end of the war. After the Civil War ended, Mitchell returned to Pontotoc County, Mississippi, where he studied law under Colonel C. B. Fontaine and was admitted to the bar. He then set up a law practice in Pontotoc County.

== Political career ==
Mitchell was elected to represent, and then represented, Pontotoc County in the Mississippi House of Representatives in the 1870 and 1871 sessions. He was a presidential elector for Winfield Scott Hancock in the 1880 election. Mitchell then represented the 20th District in the Mississippi State Senate in the 1882 and 1884 sessions. Twice in the 1880s, Mitchell unsuccessfully ran for the Democratic nomination for the U.S. House of Representatives. He was elected to the House again for the 1888 session, and served as its Speaker for that term. After being elected to fill a vacancy, he served in the House again in the 1894 session. He was re-elected to the Senate in 1895 to represent the 31st District for the 1896–1900 term. This term was cut short by his death. At the time of his death, Mitchell was also serving on the board of trustees of Mississippi Industrial Institute and College.

== Personal life and death ==
Mitchell was a member of the Baptist Church. His first wife was the former Virginia Dennis. They had seven children: Charles D., Jennie (Mitchell) Connelly, Mary (Mitchell) Morphis, Willie, George T., Annie (Mitchell) Gracy, and Fannie. After Virginia's death in 1884, Mitchell remarried to San White, with whom he had one child, Ida. Mitchell's third wife was Pauline (Bayinger) Patterson, with whom he had two children: Victor and Pauline. Mitchell died after a short illness on March 3, 1899, in Pontotoc, Mississippi.
