= Wiley Sanders =

American politician (1852–1937)

Member of the Mississippi State Senate from the 22nd district
- In office January 2, 1900 – January 1916
- Preceded by: J. C. Clark
- Succeeded by: David E. Crawley

Member of the Mississippi House of Representatives from the Attala County district
- In office January 1884 – January 1886

Personal details
- Born: July 26, 1852 Jefferson County, Alabama, U. S.
- Died: August 22, 1937 (aged 85) Kosciusko, Mississippi, U. S.
- Party: Democratic

Wiley Sanders (July 26, 1852 – August 22, 1937) was an American politician and journalist. He represented Attala County in the Mississippi State Senate from 1900 to 1916, and in the Mississippi House of Representatives in 1884. He was also the longtime editor of the Kosciusko Star, from 1895 until his death.

== Early life ==
Wiley Sanders was born on July 26, 1852, in Jefferson County, Alabama. He was the son of Absolem Sanders (born 1815), a veteran of the Seminole Wars, and Anna (Dickinson) Sanders (born 1818). The family moved to Attala County, Mississippi, in Wiley's childhood. Wiley attended Attala County's schools.

== Career ==
Sanders was an editor and farmer. On November 6, 1883, he was elected to represent Attala County in the Mississippi House of Representatives as a Democrat for the 1884 term. During this term, Sanders cast the deciding vote in favor of the Mississippi State College for Women's establishment. In 1885, Sanders left farming to enter business. In 1895, he became the editor of the Kosciusko Star-Ledger, which later became the Star-Herald.

=== 1900-1907 ===
On November 7, 1899, Sanders was elected to represent the 22nd District (Attala County) in the Mississippi State Senate for the 1900-1904 term. During this term, Sanders served on the following committees: Printing; Agriculture, Commerce, & Manufactures; County Affairs; and Immigration. On November 3, 1903, Sanders was re-elected to the Senate for the 1904-1908 term. During this term, Sanders served on the following committees: Agriculture; Commerce & Manufactures; Education; and Penitentiary & Prisons. During the 1904 session, Sanders was credited with helping pass the uniform textbook bill of 1904.

=== 1907-1911 ===
On November 5, 1907, Sanders was re-elected to the Senate for the 1908-1912 term. During this term, Sanders chaired the Printing committee, and also served on the following committees: Rules; Finance; Humane & Benevolent Institutions; Engrossed Bills; and Temperance.

=== 1911-1915 ===
On November 7, 1911, Sanders was re-elected to the Senate for the 1912-1916 term. During that term, Sanders was "the most senior member of the Senate in point of service". He chaired the Finance committee, and also served on the following committees: Rules, Printing, and Contingent Expenses.

=== 1915-1937 ===
He served as a deputy U. S. Marshal for three years under President Woodrow Wilson. He also served two terms as mayor of Kosciusko. By 1928, Sanders co-owned the Kosciusko Star-Herald with his son Stokes. Sanders endorsed Al Smith in the 1928 presidential election.

Sanders celebrated his 85th birthday on July 26, 1937, and received a congratulatory letter from President Franklin Roosevelt. Sanders died on August 22, 1937, in Kosciusko.

== Personal life ==
Sanders was a member of the Baptist Church. He was also a member of the Knights of Pythias. Sanders married Fannie Jennings Stokes on April 27, 1884. They had seven children: Harold B., Stokes L., Fannie Z., Marcie B., Paul H., Roger W., and Ethel. Stokes and Roger both served as U. S. Army officers in World War I. Wiley had 17 grandchildren and three great-grandchildren by his death.
