= Slate Springs, Mississippi =

- Village
- Location of Slate Springs, Mississippi
- Coordinates: 33°44′32″N 89°22′22″W
- Country: United States
- State: Mississippi
- County: Calhoun

Area
  - Total: 1.42 sq mi (3.67 km^{2})
  - Land: 1.42 sq mi (3.67 km^{2})
  - Water: 0 sq mi (0.00 km^{2})

Population (2020)
  - Total: 105
  - Density: 74.0/sq mi (28.58/km^{2})
- Time zone: UTC-6 (Central (CST))
  - Summer (DST): UTC-5 (CDT)
- ZIP code: 38955
- FIPS code: 28-68320

Slate Springs is a village in Calhoun County, Mississippi, United States. As of the 2020 census, Slate Springs had a population of 105.

== History ==
In 1900, the population was 189.

In 1907, Slate Springs was noted for having two churches, a school, a flour mill, a saw mill, and a money order post-office.

== Geography ==
Mississippi Highway 9 passes through the village, leading north 9 miles (14 km) to Calhoun City and south 16 miles (26 km) to Eupora.

According to the United States Census Bureau, the village has a total area of 1.4 square miles (3.7 km^{2}), all land.

== Demographics ==
Historical population
Census	Pop.	Note	%±
1900	189		—
1910	175		−7.4%
1920	155		−11.4%
1930	190		22.6%
1940	182		−4.2%
1950	134		−26.4%
1960	123		−8.2%
1970	105		−14.6%
1980	102		−2.9%
1990	118		15.7%
2000	121		2.5%
2010	110		−9.1%
2020	105		−4.5%
U.S. Decennial Census

As of the census of 2000, there were 121 people, 49 households, and 34 families residing in the village. The population density was 84.0 inhabitants per square mile (32.4/km^{2}). There were 63 housing units at an average density of 43.8 per square mile (16.9/km^{2}). The racial makeup of the village was 96.69% White, 0.83% African American, 0.83% Native American, and 1.65% from two or more races. Hispanic or Latino of any race were 0.83% of the population.

There were 49 households, out of which 24.5% had children under the age of 18 living with them, 59.2% were married couples living together, 8.2% had a female householder with no husband present, and 30.6% were non-families. 28.6% of all households were made up of individuals, and 16.3% had someone living alone who was 65 years of age or older. The average household size was 2.47 and the average family size was 3.00.

In the village, the population was spread out, with 24.0% under the age of 18, 9.1% from 18 to 24, 28.9% from 25 to 44, 24.8% from 45 to 64, and 13.2% who were 65 years of age or older. The median age was 34 years. For every 100 females, there were 98.4 males. For every 100 females age 18 and over, there were 87.8 males.

The median income for a household in the village was $26,875, and the median income for a family was $39,375. Males had a median income of $30,417 versus $20,417 for females. The per capita income for the village was $11,322. There were 26.3% of families and 27.3% of the population living below the poverty line, including 36.2% of under eighteens and 58.3% of those over 64.

== Education ==
Slate Springs is served by the Calhoun County School District.

== Notable people ==
- J. J. Adams, Mississippi state senator (1908-1912), Slate Springs native
- Fox Conner, United States Army officer, early mentor of Dwight D. Eisenhower
- Anne (Phillips) McMath, wife of Arkansas governor Sid McMath, was born in Slate Springs in 1920.
