= Malcolm B. Montgomery =

American judge (1891–1974)

Malcolm Bailey Montgomery (June 26, 1891 – February 8, 1974) was a justice of the Supreme Court of Mississippi from 1948 to 1950.

Born in Yazoo County, Mississippi, Montgomery attended the public schools and received an undergraduate degree from Mississippi College, followed by a law degree from the University of Mississippi School of Law. He entered the practice of law with his brother until around 1930, when he became a chancery judge, the youngest then serving in the state.

In December 1947, Chief Justice Sydney M. Smith—the longest-serving member of the court—announced that he would not seek reelection. "Within ten days both Circuit Judge Percy Lee (age 55) of Forest and seventeen year Chancellor Malcolm B. Montgomery (age 56) of Yazoo City had qualified to run".

Chief Justice Smith died in July 1948. "The funeral was Monday, and on Wednesday, Governor Fielding Wright named Chancellor Montgomery to the vacancy". The election was held in 1948, with Lee debating Montgomery in advance of the Democratic primary; "A point of contention was whether Judge Montgomery had visited the governor to request the appointment, an allegation Lee made and Montgomery denied". Lee won the primary, but Montgomery remained on the court until the expiration of Smith's term in 1950.

Following his service on the supreme court, Montgomery returned to the practice law, remaining in practice until his death, in Yazoo, at the age of 82.

Political offices
Preceded by Sydney M. Smith	Justice of the Supreme Court of Mississippi; 1948–1950	Succeeded by Percy Mercer Lee
