= Benjamin Wofford =

American Methodist minister (1780–1850)

- Born: October 19, 1780
- Died: 1850 (aged 69–70)
- Occupation(s): Clergyman, farmer
- Spouses: Anna Todd; Maria Scott Barron
- Parent(s): Joseph Wofford; Martha Wofford

Benjamin Wofford (October 19, 1780–1850) was a Methodist minister who was a co-founder and the namesake of Wofford College in South Carolina in the United States.

== Early life ==
Benjamin Wofford was born on October 19, 1780, to Joseph and Martha Wofford and was named after his Loyalist uncle. Wofford's father, a supporter of the American Patriot cause, was supposedly captured on the night of Wofford's birth during the American Revolution, but was freed by Martha Wofford's pleading. Under his mother's Christian mentorship, Wofford became a Christian.

== Career ==
Wofford was ordained as a Methodist preacher, going on to preach in Kentucky, Tennessee, and South Carolina. By 1807, he ran a farm and continued preaching locally in South Carolina.

Wofford became involved in banking and other investments in the region. Wofford was a co-founder of Central Methodist Church in Spartanburg in 1837. Wofford was involved in various church charitable causes, including donating to Randolph-Macon College in Virginia during the 1830s.

== Personal life ==
Wofford married Anna Todd, the only child from a wealthy Spartanburg family, in 1807. The Woffords had no children. His wife died on October 2, 1835, at age 51. On September 6, 1836, Wofford married Maria Scott Barron, a wealthy woman from East Tennessee who was 23 years younger than Wofford. Wofford also owned slaves.

== Death and legacy ==
Wofford died in 1850 and left a will donating $100,000 (~$2.92 million in 2024) for the creation of a college, which eventually became Wofford College, requesting the creation of a school "literary, classical, and scientific education in my native district of Spartanburg.".
