= Hugh McQueen Street =

American businessman and politician

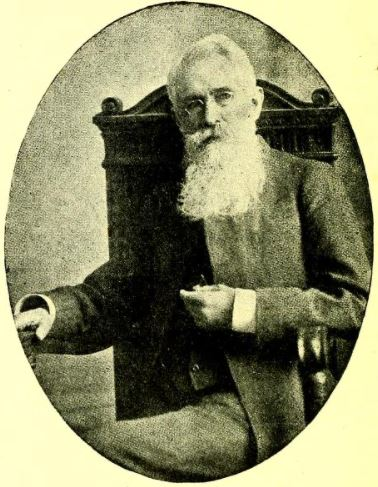

34th, 36th, 44th, and 49th Speaker of the Mississippi House of Representatives
- In office January 7, 1908 – January 1912
- Preceded by: Emmet Thomas
- Succeeded by: Hillrie M. Quin
- In office January 1892 – 1894
- Preceded by: James S. Madison
- Succeeded by: James K. Vardaman
- In office 1876–1878
- Preceded by: Isaac D. Shadd
- Succeeded by: W. A. Percy
- In office 1873–1874
- Preceded by: John R. Lynch
- Succeeded by: Isaac D. Shadd

Member of the Mississippi House of Representatives from the Lauderdale County district
- In office January 7, 1908 – January 1912
- In office January 1890 – 1894
- In office 1870–1880

Personal details
- Born: January 7, 1833 Moore County, North Carolina
- Died: May 31, 1920 (aged 87) Meridian, Mississippi
- Party: Democratic

Hugh McQueen Street (January 7, 1833 – May 31, 1920) was an American businessman and Democratic Party politician. He served in the Mississippi House of Representatives from 1870 to 1880, 1890 to 1894, and from 1908 to 1912. He was its Speaker in four different stints (1873–1874, 1876–1878, 1892–1894, 1908–1912).

== Early life and family ==
Hugh McQueen Street was born on January 7, 1833, in Moore County, North Carolina. He was of Scottish ancestry. He was the oldest of 13 children of Donald Street, whose family first settled in Prince William County, Virginia, before moving to North Carolina; and his wife, Lydia (McBryde) Street. Street's paternal great-uncle, Hugh McQueen, was an Attorney General of North Carolina. Street's maternal grandfather, Archibald McBryde, was a member of Congress.

Street attended an "old-field school" in 1840, and attended Carthage High School from 1847 to 1848. Street moved with his family to Tishomingo County, Mississippi, in 1852.

=== Military career ===
In 1861, Street joined the Confederate Army, and served, mostly on detached duty, until 1865. He was a member of the 26th Mississippi Infantry Regiment.

== Political career ==
=== First stint (1870-1880) ===
In 1869, Street was elected to represent Tishomingo County in the Mississippi House of Representatives. In 1870, he introduced a bill creating Prentiss County. Representing Prentiss County, he served two-year terms, ending in 1880 when he chose not to seek re-election in 1879. From 1873 to 1874 and from 1876 to 1878, Street was the Speaker of the Mississippi House.

=== Second and third stints (1890-1894, 1908-1912) ===
In 1889, Street was elected to represent Lauderdale County in the Mississippi House of Representatives, and served a two-year term from 1890 to 1892. During that term, Street introduced the bill that created the Mississippi Constitutional Convention of 1890, on which he served himself. The convention created the 1890 Mississippi Constitution, which disenfranchised black voters. Street was re-elected in 1891 for a four-year term and, at the beginning of the session in 1892, was elected Speaker again, by a close 61–59 vote over James S. Madison. He resigned from the term during the legislature's 1894 session. On November 5, 1907, Street was elected for another four-year House term from 1908 to 1912. On January 7, 1908 (also his 75th birthday), Street was also elected Speaker of the House for that term. In total, he served as the Speaker of the Mississippi House of Representatives in four different stints.

== Later life ==
Street died at his home in Meridian, Mississippi, on May 31, 1920.

== Personal life ==
Street married Charlotte Elizabeth Prindle on November 2, 1858. Street then married Charlotte Augusta Ryder on October 13, 1887. As of 1908, Street had five living children: Charles R., Albert J., Bessie Lee (Street) Coburn, Ethel, and Lottie Prentiss (Street) Champenois.
