= Bobby Mayes =

English footballer

Personal information
- Full name: Robert Mayes
- Date of birth: 18 December 1967 (age 58)
- Place of birth: Ipswich, England
- Position: Midfielder

Youth career
- West Ham United

Senior career*
Years	Team	Apps	(Gls)
1988–1989	Ipswich Town	0	(0)
1989	Bury Town		
1989–1990	Kettering Town	2	(0)
1990–1991	Wivenhoe Town	32	(10)
1991–1992	Redbridge Forest	34	(5)
1992–1993	Dagenham & Redbridge	9	(0)
1994–1995	Sudbury Town		
1995–1997	Chelmsford City	37	(8)
1997–1998	Braintree Town		
1998–1999	Felixstowe Town		
1999–2000	Diss Town		
2000–2001	Maldon Town		
2001–2002	Clacton Town		
2002–2003	Stowmarket Town		

International career
1986	England Youth	1	(0)
- * Club domestic league appearances and goals

Robert Mayes (born 18 December 1967) is an English former professional footballer who played as a midfielder.

He made his professional debut for Ipswich Town on 23 November 1988, in a 3–2 win over Oxford United in a Full Members' Cup tie, replacing Frank Yallop as a substitute.
