= Bellefontaine, Mississippi =

- Unincorporated community
- Location within Mississippi Location within the United States
- Coordinates: 33°38′55″N 89°18′36″W
- Country: United States
- State: Mississippi
- County: Webster
- Elevation: 348 ft (106 m)
- Time zone: UTC-6 (Central (CST))
  - Summer (DST): UTC-5 (CDT)
- ZIP code: 39737
- Area code: 662
- GNIS feature ID: 666791

Bellefontaine is an unincorporated community in Webster County, Mississippi, United States. Its ZIP code is 39737.

== History ==
In the early 1900s, Bellefontaine had a money order post office and three churches. Several artesian wells had been found at and near the settlement.
