= John W. White (politician) =

American politician

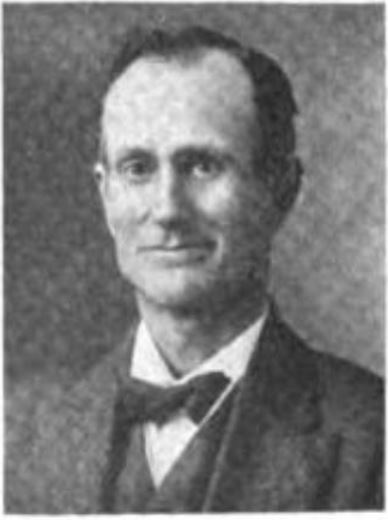
- c. 1917

Member of the Mississippi State Senate from the 3rd district
- In office January 1916 – January 1920

Member of the Mississippi House of Representatives from the Jasper County district
- In office January 1912 – January 1916

Personal details
- Born: November 18, 1863 Rose Hill, Mississippi
- Died: July 27, 1921 (aged 57)
- Party: Democrat
- Other political affiliations: Populist (before 1909)
- Children: 6

John Wofford White (November 18, 1863 – July 27, 1921) was an American Democratic politician. He was a member of the Mississippi State Senate and the Mississippi House of Representatives in the 1910s.

== Biography ==
John Wofford White was born on November 18, 1863, in Rose Hill, Jasper County, Mississippi. He was the son of Benjamin Wofford White and Eliza (Chatham) White. His great-uncle (paternal grandmother's brother) was Benjamin Wofford, who was the funder of Wofford College. White attended the Rose Hill Institute and became a planter. He was a temperance activist. Before it folded in 1909, he was a member of the Populist Party. He represented Jasper County in the Mississippi House of Representatives from 1912 to 1916. In November 1915, he was elected to represent Mississippi's 3rd senatorial district, composed of Clarke and Jasper Counties, as a Democrat. He died on July 27, 1921, and was buried in Pleasant Grove Cemetery in Jasper County.

== Personal life ==
White was a member of the Methodist Church. He married twice; his first marriage was to Clara Alice McKinnon. He and Clara had two children: Daniel McKinnon White and Clara Amelia (White) Taylor. After his first wife died, White then married Mary Jane Aycock in July 1897. They had four children together: John Harold, Wilbur Wofford, Avie Lee, and James D. Mary died on July 29, 1916.
