= Calhoun County School District (Mississippi) =

School district in Mississippi

Location
- Pittsboro, Mississippi; Calhoun County United States

District information
- Type: Public
- Grades: Pre-K – 12th
- Superintendent: Lisa Langford
- NCES District ID: 2800870

Students and staff
- Students: 2,054 (2023–24)
- Teachers: 203.94 (FTE)
- Student–teacher ratio: 10.08

Other information
- Website: www.calhounk12.com

The Calhoun County School District is a public school district based in Pittsboro, Mississippi (US), and serves over 2000 students. The district's boundaries parallel that of Calhoun County.

== Schools ==
- Bruce High School
- Calhoun City High School
- Vardaman High School
- Bruce Upper Elementary School
- Bruce Elementary School
- Calhoun City Elementary School
- Vardaman Elementary School

== Demographics ==
=== 2006–07 school year ===
There were a total of 2,641 students enrolled in the Calhoun County School District during the 2006–2007 school year. The gender makeup of the district was 49% female and 51% male. The racial makeup of the district was 38.66% African American, 54.41% White, 6.74% Hispanic, 0.15% Asian, and 0.03% Native American. 61.4% of the district's students were eligible to receive free lunch.

=== Previous school years ===
School Year	Enrollment	Gender Makeup		Racial Makeup				
School Year	Enrollment	Female	Male	Asian	African American	Hispanic	Native American	White
2005–06	2,618	50%	50%	0.23%	39.15%	6.88%	0.04%	53.71%
2004–05	2,591	50%	50%	0. 04%	40.91%	6.56%	0.04%	52.45%
2003–04	2,546	50%	50%	0.04%	42.14%	5.18%	–	52.63%
2002–03	2,587	50%	50%	0.08%	43.18%	4.21%	–	52.53%

== Accountability statistics ==
	2006–07	2005–06	2004–05	2003–04	2002–03
District Accreditation Status	Accredited	Accredited	Accredited	Accredited	Accredited
School Performance Classifications
Level 5 (Superior Performing) Schools	1	0	1	0	0
Level 4 (Exemplary) Schools	0	3	2	2	1
Level 3 (Successful) Schools	6	4	4	5	6
Level 2 (Under Performing) Schools	0	0	0	0	0
Level 1 (Low Performing) Schools	0	0	0	0	0
Not Assigned	0	0	0	0	0

== See also ==
- List of school districts in Mississippi
