= Richard F. Reed =

American judge (1861–1926)

Associate Justice of the Supreme Court of Mississippi
- In office August 1912 – 1915

Member of the Mississippi State Senate from the 9th district
- In office January 1912 – August 1912
- Preceded by: Charles F. Engle
- Succeeded by: W. C. Martin

Personal details
- Born: November 11, 1861 Fayette, Mississippi, U.S.
- Died: May 31, 1926 (aged 64) Natchez, Mississippi, U.S.
- Party: Democratic

Richard Forman Reed (November 11, 1861 – May 31, 1926) was an American state legislator and justice of the Supreme Court of Mississippi from 1912 to 1915.

Born in Jefferson County, Mississippi on November 11, 1861, Reed established his home in Natchez, Mississippi, where he entered the practice of law with his father in 1885. Reed represented Adams County, Mississippi, for one term in the Mississippi State Senate, where he unsuccessfully opposed a measure to transition to an elected judiciary. He was "regarded by many as perhaps the ablest lawyer in the Senate".

Reed was an unsuccessful candidate for the Republican nomination for a seat in the United States House of Representatives, but later that year was appointed by Governor Earl L. Brewer to a seat on the state supreme court vacated by the resignation of Chief Justice Robert Burns Mayes. After his appointment to the state supreme court, he was succeeded in the Senate by W. C. Martin. In addition to his judicial service, Reed was known as a writer, having written a piece titled The Nature Country describing the settlement of Natchez. He lectured on law at Millsaps College.

Reed died at his home in Natchez on May 31, 1926, at the age of 64.

Political offices
Preceded by Robert Burns Mayes	Justice of the Supreme Court of Mississippi; 1912–1915	Succeeded by J. Morgan Stevens
