= Elisha A. Anderson =

American lawyer and politician

Member of the Mississippi House of Representatives from the Forrest County district
- In office January 1912 – January 1920

Personal details
- Born: October 14, 1866 Perry County, MS
- Died: July 31, 1941 (aged 74)
- Party: Democratic

Elisha Alexander "Zan" Anderson (October 14, 1866 – July 31, 1941) was an American lawyer and Democratic politician. He was a member of the Mississippi House of Representatives from 1912 to 1920.

== Biography ==
Elisha Alexander Anderson was born on October 14, 1866, in Perry, now Forrest, County, Mississippi. He was the son of Daniel Austin Anderson, a Confederate Civil War veteran, and Henrietta Rebecca (Stanford) Anderson. Anderson was born and grew up on a farm. In his youth Anderson attended the public schools of Perry County. He decided to be a lawyer and became a law clerk in Hattiesburg, Mississippi. He took a course from the Law Department of Millsaps College and received a L. L. B. when he completed it in 1892. After completing the course, he began practicing law in Hattiesburg. He enlisted in the National Guard during the Spanish-American War. In 1912, he was elected as a Democrat to the Mississippi House of Representatives. He was re-elected to represent Forrest County in the House 1915 for the 1916-1920 term. Anderson died on July 31, 1941.

== Personal life ==
Anderson married Julia Smith in 1890. They had four children.
