= John Fatheree =

American politician and judge (1879–1964)

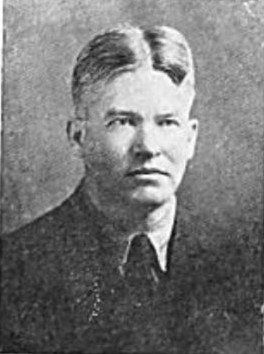
- c. 1923

President pro tempore of the Mississippi State Senate
- In office January 6, 1920 – January 1922
- Preceded by: Carroll Kendrick
- Succeeded by: Fred B. Smith

Member of the Mississippi State Senate from the 3rd district
- In office January 6, 1920 – January 1922
- Preceded by: John W. White
- Succeeded by: William Edwards
- In office January 1912 – January 1916
- Preceded by: Samuel Whitman Jr.
- Succeeded by: John W. White

Member of the Mississippi House of Representatives from the Clarke County district Clarke and Jasper Counties (1908–1912)
- In office January 1924 – 1927
- In office January 1908 – January 1912

Personal details
- Born: April 9, 1879 De Soto, Mississippi, U.S.
- Died: July 30, 1964 (aged 85) Quitman, Mississippi, U.S.
- Party: Democratic

John Davis Fatheree (April 9, 1879 – July 30, 1964) was a lawyer, politician, and judge in Mississippi. He served in the Mississippi House of Representatives and the Mississippi Senate, including as President of the Mississippi Senate for the 1920 term. He served two terms as mayor of Quitman, Mississippi. He was a lawyer in Clarke County and a circuit judge. He was a Democrat.

== Early life ==
John Davis Fatheree was born on April 9, 1879, near De Soto, Mississippi. He was the son of John Ware Fatheree, a Confederate States Army soldier of French Huguenot descent wounded at the Siege of Petersburg, and his wife Louisa (Sellers) Fatheree. John Davis Fatheree attended the "common schools" of his native Clarke County. He then attended Millsaps College where he studied law, graduating on May 9, 1902. Later that month, Fatheree was admitted to the bar and began practicing law.

== Political career ==
=== 1907-1919 ===
On November 5, 1907, Fatheree was elected to represent Clarke and Jasper Counties as a Democrat in the Mississippi House of Representatives for a four-year term spanning from 1908 to 1912. During this term, Fatheree served on the following House committees: Ways and Means; Immigration and Labor; Judiciary; and Public Lands. On November 7, 1911, Fatheree was elected to represent the 3rd District in the Mississippi State Senate for the 1912–1916 term. During this term, Fatheree was the Chairman of the Senate's Public Lands Committee, and also served on the following committees: Corporations; Judiciary; To Investigate State Officers; Constitution; Fisheries and Game; and State Library. During World War I, Fatheree served as a Captain in the U. S. Infantry.

=== 1919-1922 ===
In November 1919, Fatheree was re-elected to the 3rd District of the State Senate for the 1920–1924 term. On January 6, 1920, the first day of the session, the election for president pro tempore was held. Fatheree was nominated for the office alongside William Gwin Kiger and William J. East. No candidate received an absolute majority vote for the first five ballots. After the fifth ballot, Kiger's name was dropped from the list as he had the fewest votes in that ballot (14 compared to 15 each for East and Fatheree). In the sixth ballot, Fatheree defeated East with a 28–16 vote, and was elected President Pro Tempore for the 1920–1924 term. During this term, he served on the Conference Committee in the Mississippi Senate. In 1921, Fatheree ran for the position of Circuit Court judge, and proceeded to win the election. Fatheree then resigned from his Senate position, and William Edwards was elected to replace him in the 3rd District. Frederick Brougher Smith replaced Fatheree as president pro tempore for the 1922 session.

=== 1924-1964 ===
In 1923, Fatheree was elected to represent Clarke County in the Mississippi House of Representatives for the 1924–1928 term. During this term, Fatheree was the Chairman of the Senate's Committee on County Affairs. In 1926, Fatheree was elected Circuit Court Judge for the 10th District. He was sworn in to the position in 1927. He served as a Circuit Judge for a total of three terms. He served for two terms as the mayor of Quitman, Mississippi. He continued practicing law in Clarke County until his retirement in 1954.

Fatheree died at his home in Quitman, Mississippi, on July 30, 1964. He was survived by a daughter and two sisters.

== Personal life ==
Fatheree belonged to the Methodist Episcopal Church.

== See also ==
- List of former members of the Mississippi State Senate
