= Jasper Felix Guynes =

American politician and judge

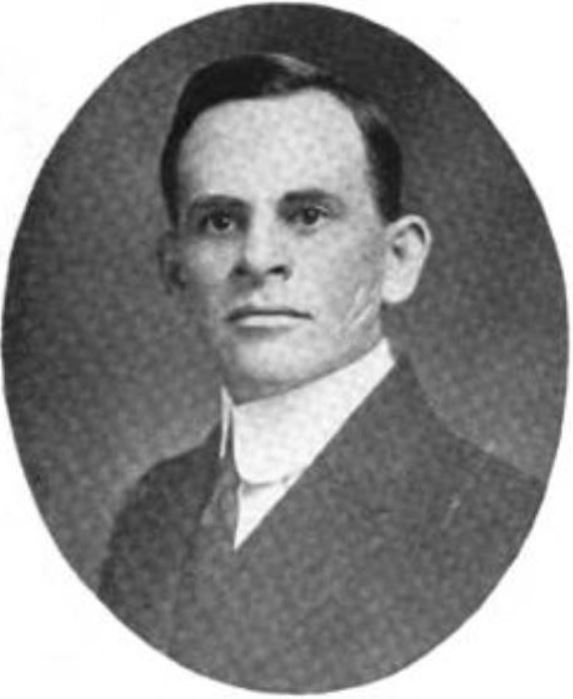
- 1910s

Member of the Mississippi Senate from the 11th district
- In office June 10, 1913 – January 1916
- Preceded by: Elias Alford Rowan
- Succeeded by: James M. Coen

Personal details
- Born: February 21, 1875 Copiah County, MS
- Died: August 15, 1961 (aged 86)
- Resting place: Hazlehurst, MS
- Party: Democrat

Jasper Felix Guynes (February 21, 1875 - August 15, 1961) was a Democratic Mississippi state senator and circuit court judge.

== Biography ==
Jasper Felix Guynes was born on February 21, 1875, near Hazlehurst, in Copiah County, Mississippi. He was the son of Mississippi state legislator Albert Brown Guynes and Emma Jane (Ramsey) Guynes. Jasper graduated from the University of Mississippi with a B. A. in 1898. Then, he graduated from the University of Mississippi Law School with a L.L.B. in 1902. After the death of Mississippi State Senator E. A. Rowan in 1912, Guynes won the election to fill in for the vacancy in the 11th district, as a Democrat. He was sworn in during a special legislature session on June 10, 1913. After his term ended, on February 1, 1916, he was appointed Mississippi Circuit Court Judge of the Fourteenth District. He was elected Circuit Court Judge of the same district in 1934, and served in that position until 1949. He then was a Chancellor in one of Mississippi's chancery courts from 1950 to his death. He died after a short illness on August 15, 1961, and was buried in the Hazlehurst New Cemetery.
