= Calvin B. Vance =

American politician (1842–1926)

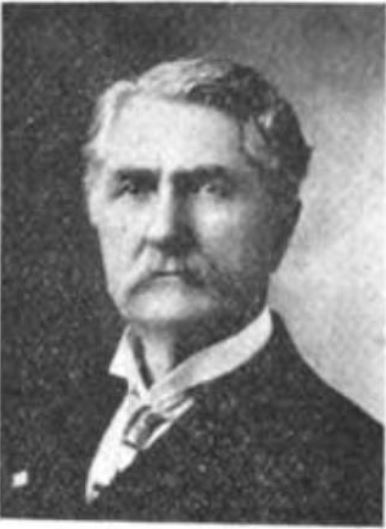
- c. 1917

Member of the Mississippi State Senate from the 33rd district 26th (1878-1882)
- In office January 1916 – January 1920
- In office January 1908 – January 1912
- In office January 1878 – January 1882

Personal details
- Born: December 26, 1842 Panola County, Mississippi, U.S.
- Died: April 18, 1926 (aged 83) Memphis, Tennessee, U.S.
- Party: Democratic
- Children: 3

Calvin Brooks Vance (December 26, 1842 - April 18, 1926) was an American planter and Democratic politician. He was a member of the Mississippi State Senate, from Panola County, from 1878 to 1882, from 1908 to 1912, and from 1916 to 1920.

== Early life ==
Calvin Brooks Vance was born on December 26, 1842, in Panola County, Mississippi. He was the son of Elisha Quinby Vance, an enslaver and cotton planter, and Cypressa C. (Brooks) Vance. Vance attended the schools of Panola County, and studied at the Kentucky Military Institute and the University of Virginia, before leaving that school to join the Confederate States Army after the American Civil War began. He entered the war by enlisting in an artillery company; he was eventually commissioned and then promoted to Captain. He was also wounded twice during the Siege of Vicksburg.

== Professional career ==
After the war, Vance managed his plantation, which had been damaged during the war. During Reconstruction, he was a member of the first iteration of the Ku Klux Klan. He was the editor of a newspaper from 1875 to 1878, and was made a Brigadier-General of the state militia in 1876. In 1877, Vance was elected to represent the 26th District as a Democrat in the Mississippi State Senate, and served in the 1878–1880 term. In 1879, Vance was re-elected to the Senate and served in the 1880–1882 term. In 1900, Vance helped set up the Bank of Batesville, after which he served as its president. In November 1907, Vance was re-elected to the Mississippi State Senate, this time for the 33rd District, and served in the 1908–1912 term. In November 1915, Vance was re-elected to the Senate, and served in the 1916–1920 term. In 1925, Vance stopped being the president of the Bank of Batesville and retired from all business activities.

== Personal life ==
Vance married Lida Butler in 1889. They had three sons: Elisha (Earl) Quinby, Calvin Brooks Jr., and John David. Vance died after a 4-day illness on 4 PM on Sunday, April 18, 1926, in the Gartly-Ramsay Hospital in Memphis, Tennessee.
