= Carlton Lindsey =

American politician

Member of the Mississippi House of Representatives from the Choctaw County district
- In office January 1942 – January 1932
- In office January 1908 – January 1920

Personal details
- Born: February 4, 1853 Choctaw County, MS
- Party: Democrat (1900-)
- Other political affiliations: People's (1894-1900)

Carlton Alexander Lindsey was a Democratic member of the Mississippi House of Representatives, representing Choctaw County, from 1908 to 1920 and from 1928 to 1932.

== Biography ==
Carlton Alexander Lindsey was born on February 4, 1853, near Huntsville, Choctaw County, Mississippi. He was the son of Carlton and Martha Susan (Caperton) Lindsey. He married Mattie Emelia Love in 1883. He was a member of the People's Party from 1894 to 1900. He switched to the Democratic Party afterwards. He was first elected to the Mississippi House of Representatives to represent his native Choctaw County in November 1907 for the 1908-1912 term. He was re-elected in 1912 and 1916. He was then re-elected to the position in 1928 for the 1928-1932 term.
