= James C. Eskridge =

American Democratic politician (1873–1949)

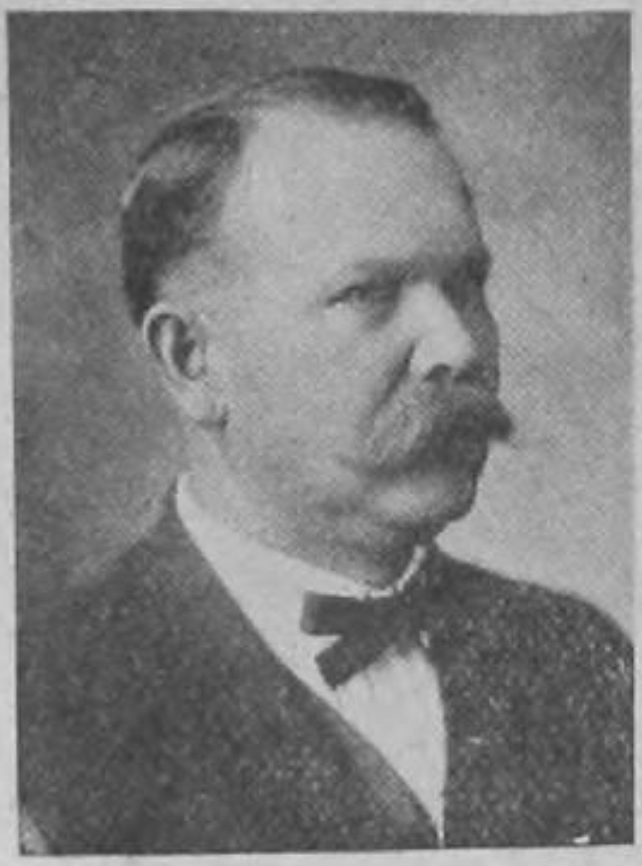
- c. 1917

Member of the Mississippi State Senate from the 32nd district
- In office January 1916 – January 1920

Member of the Mississippi House of Representatives from the Lafayette County district
- In office January 1912 – January 1916 Serving with James Mortimer Saunders

Personal details
- Born: April 26, 1873 Houston, Mississippi, U.S.
- Died: 1949 (aged 75–76) New Orleans, Louisiana, U.S.
- Party: Democratic

James Clarence Eskridge (April 26, 1873 – 1949) was an American Democratic politician. He was a member of the Mississippi State Senate, from the 32nd district, from 1916 to 1920.

== Biography ==
James Clarence Eskridge was born on April 26, 1873, in Houston, Mississippi. He was the son of William Laurel Eskridge and Elizabeth Catherine (Hill) Eskridge. He was of English descent. Eskridge attended the common schools of Chickasaw County, Mississippi and then graduated from Tula Normal Institute in 1888. In 1889, Eskridge took a teacher's course at Iuka Normal Institute, and then taught schools in Pontotoc County for a year, and taught schools in Panola County for the next year. After that, Eskridge participated in the lumber and mercantile businesses.

== Political career ==
In 1911, Eskridge was elected to represent Lafayette County in the Mississippi House of Representatives, and served in the 1912-1916 term. During this term, Eskridge served in the Penitentiary, Appropriations, and Manufactures committees. In 1915, Eskridge was elected to represent the 32nd district in the Mississippi State Senate for the 1916-1920 term. During this term, Eskridge served on the Rules, Finance, Corporations, Agriculture & Commerce, Drainage, and Fees & Salaries committees, and he was also the Chairman of the Finance Committee.

== Later life ==
Eskridge died in 1949 in New Orleans, Louisiana.

== Personal life ==
Eskridge was a Baptist, a Freemason, and a Woodman of the World. He married Jimmie Phoebe Lynch on March 1, 1899, in Delay, Mississippi. They had three sons, named Samuel Richard, James Laurel, and Clarence Wade.
