= Elias Alford Rowan =

American politician

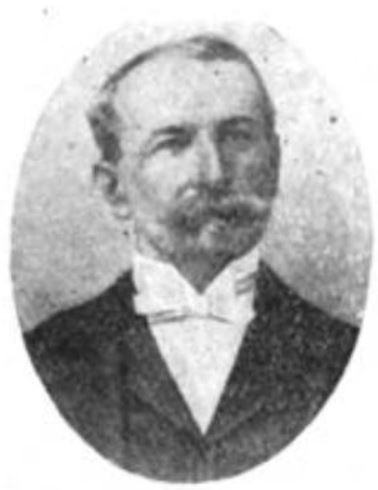
- 1910s

Member of the Mississippi Senate from the 11th district
- In office January 1896 – January 1904
- Preceded by: R. P. Willing, Jr.
- Succeeded by: Myron S. McNeil
- In office January 1908 – December 10, 1912
- Preceded by: Myron S. McNeil
- Succeeded by: Jasper Felix Guynes

Member of the Mississippi House of Representatives from the Copiah County district
- In office 1884–1888 Serving with Albert Brown Guynes (1884-86); T. J. Millsaps (1886-88)
- Preceded by: George S. Dodds
- Succeeded by: J. F. Sexton; J. L. Ramsey
- In office 1876–1877 Serving with George W. Miller
- Preceded by: D. Bufkin; R. Chrismas
- Succeeded by: R. N. Miller; Joseph H. Catchings

Personal details
- Born: December 31, 1837 Crystal Springs, Mississippi
- Died: December 10, 1912 (aged 74) Wesson, Mississippi
- Party: Democrat
- Spouse(s): Mary Mobley (m. 1867-1869, her death); Julia Lamb (m. 1874-unknown)
- Children: 7

Military service
- Allegiance: Confederate States
- Branch/service: Confederate States Army
- Years of service: 1861-1864
- Rank: Captain
- Battles/wars: Civil War: Battle of Nashville

Elias Alford Rowan (December 31, 1837 - December 10, 1912) was a longtime Mississippi state legislator from Copiah County in the late 19th and early 20th centuries.

== Early life ==
Elias Alford Rowan was born on December 31, 1837, near Crystal Springs, in Copiah County, Mississippi. His parents were Samuel Rowan, who was born in Robeson County, North Carolina and was of French ancestry, and Jeannette (Alford) Rowan, of Scottish ancestry. He received his early education in the country schools of Copiah County. He was a student in the Tulane University (then known as Louisiana University) medical school in the 1860-61 session.

== Military career ==
In May 1861, during the Civil War, Rowan temporarily stopped going to Tulane and enlisted in the Twelfth Mississippi Infantry of the Confederate Army. However, he was discharged, in Corinth, before his unit left for Virginia due to illness. Afterwards, he re-enlisted in Company G of the Sixth Mississippi Infantry. After the reorganization of the army, he commissioned a lieutenant. He also served as assistant surgeon of the regiment after the original assistant surgeon was captured. He was promoted to captain of Company G after the captain of Company G died. During the Battle of Nashville in December 1864, Rowan was captured and taken to Johnson's Island, where he remained until his release on June 16, 1865.

== Postwar ==
After returning to Mississippi, Rowan went back to going to Tulane Medical School, where he graduated with an M. D. degree in March 1866. He then started practicing medicine in Copiah County. He moved to Wesson in 1869, where he would reside for the rest of his life. Around that time, he built a large, 24-room Victorian house in Wesson, as the home of his wife and children. Rowan planned to also hospitalize patients there, but it was only used as a hospital in April 1883 after a tornado had hit the area.

== Political career ==
=== House of Representatives ===
Rowan was first elected to the Mississippi House of Representatives, representing Copiah County as a Democrat, in 1875, for the sessions of 1876 and 1877. He was also elected for the sessions of 1884 and 1886. In the 1886 session, he helped introduce local option alcohol laws in Mississippi.

=== Senate ===
Rowan was first elected to the Mississippi State Senate, representing the 11th district, which was composed of Copiah County, in 1895. He was re-elected to the Senate in 1899, 1907, and 1911. In the 1908-1910 sessions, he was the chairman of the Quarantine committee. In the 1912 session, he was the chairman of the Humane and Benevolent Institutions committee and the Temperance committee.

=== Political views ===
Rowan was a large supporter of prohibition of alcohol.

== Death ==
At 10:30 AM on December 10, 1912, in Wesson, Mississippi, Rowan was struck by and killed by a southbound Illinois Central passenger train. Jasper Felix Guynes was elected to fill the vacancy in the Senate left by his death.

== Personal life ==
Rowan was a member of the Baptist Church. He was a member of the Odd Fellows and Freemasons. In 1867, Rowan married Mary Augusta Mobley. She died in May 1869, leaving no children. Elias married Julia Lamb in 1874. They had seven children together: Jeannette Alford Rowan, Martha (Rowan) Wright, Dr. Samuel Lamb Rowan, Elias A. Rowan Junior, Lillie (Rowan) Taylor, Julia Franklin Rowan, and John House Rowan. Lillie, Julia, Samuel Lamb, and John survived Elias Senior when he died.
