= Hillrie M. Quin =

American politician (1866–1923)

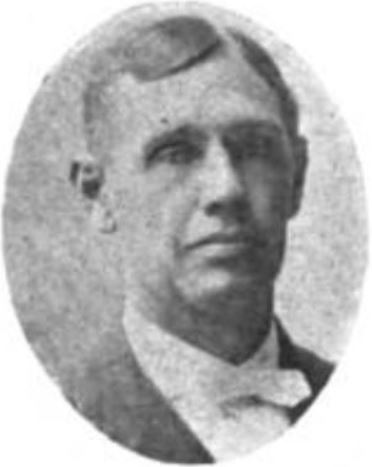
- c. 1907

Speaker of the Mississippi House of Representatives
- In office January 2, 1912 – January 1916
- Preceded by: Hugh McQueen Street
- Succeeded by: Martin Sennett Conner

Member of the Mississippi House of Representatives from the Hinds County district Wilkinson County (1900-1904)
- In office January 1908 – January 1916
- In office January 1900 – January 1904

Personal details
- Born: Hillrie Marshall Quin; March 2, 1866 Holmesville, Mississippi
- Died: January 20, 1923 (aged 56) Meridian, Mississippi
- Party: Democratic

Hillrie Marshall Quin (March 2, 1866 - January 20, 1923) was an American politician. He was the speaker of the Mississippi House of Representatives from 1912 to 1916.

== Biography ==
Hillrie Marshall Quin was born on March 2, 1866, in Holmesville, Pike County, Mississippi. He was the son of Daniel Marshall Quin, a surgeon from Pike County, and Annie Beatty (Long) Quin. Quin attended Peabody Public School in Summit, Mississippi. He then attended the University of Mississippi and graduated with an A. B. in 1886. He became a teacher and became the principal of schools in McComb City and Fayette. In 1892, Quin entered the newspaper business in Centreville and stayed there until 1902. In 1902, Quin entered the University of Mississippi Law School and got a bachelor's degree there in 1904. He then joined a law firm in Jackson.

Quin died of a sudden heart attack in Meridian, Mississippi, on January 20, 1923.

== Political career ==
Beginning in 1889, Quin was a delegate to Mississippi state Democratic conventions. He was a delegate to the National Democratic Convention in 1896. He represented Wilkinson County in the Mississippi House of Representatives from 1900 to 1904, and was also a member of the Centreville Board of Aldermen from 1900 to 1902. Quin was a presidential elector from Mississippi in the 1904 election. In November 1907, Quin was elected to represent Hinds County in the Mississippi House of Representatives from 1908 to 1912. Quin was nominated for Speaker of the House during this term and led every ballot except for the last one. In November 1911, Quin was re-elected to the House, for the term from 1912 to 1916. On January 2, 1912, Quin was unanimously elected to the position of Speaker and served from 1912 from 1916.
