= John Going =

American politician

Member of the Mississippi House of Representatives from the Calhoun County district
- In office January 1940 – January 1948
- In office January 1908 – January 1920

Personal details
- Born: January 26, 1873 Pittsboro, Mississippi
- Party: Democrat

John Byrd Going (1873–?) was a Democratic member of the Mississippi House of Representatives, representing Calhoun County, from 1908 to 1920 and from 1940 to 1948.

== Biography ==
John Byrd Going was born on January 26, 1873, in Pittsboro, Calhoun County, Mississippi. His parents were David Going and Martha Caroline (Pilgreen) Going. He launched a newspaper, the Dixie Herald, in 1903 and became the editor. He married Ronda Steele in 1906. He was first elected to the Mississippi House of Representatives to represent Calhoun County as a Democrat on November 5, 1907. He was re-elected in 1911 and 1915. He also represented Calhoun County in the House from 1940 to 1944. He was re-elected and served from 1944 to 1948.
