= The Mississippi Bar =

Bar Association

- Type: Legal Society
- Headquarters: Jackson, MS
- Location: United States
- Members: 10,000 in 2012 (3,000 out of state)
- Website: http://www.msbar.org/

The Mississippi Bar is the integrated (mandatory) bar association of the U.S. state of Mississippi.

== History ==
The Mississippi Bar traces its lineage to a voluntary membership organization formed in 1821; however, this association lapsed after four years. It was revived in 1886, but lapsed six years later. In 1905, it was revived again; its first president was G.D. Shands. During the Great Depression, membership dwindled amid public skepticism about lawyer ethics. In response, leading Mississippi lawyers successfully urged the passage of the state's Unified Bar Act in 1932, leading to the present-day mandatory Bar.

== Structure ==
Bar policy is set by a Board consisting of the organization's officers plus Board members elected by state circuit court district.

The Bar’s Consumer Assistance Program is designed to assist clients with every day consumer type problems with their attorneys.

The Bar does not regulate the Bar exam; that function is fulfilled by the Mississippi Board of Bar Admissions.

The Bar enforces the rule that Mississippi lawyers must complete 12 credits each year.
