= 1900–1904 Mississippi Legislature =

←	1896–1900 Mississippi Legislature	1904–1908 Mississippi Legislature	→

Overview
- Legislative body: Mississippi Legislature
- Jurisdiction: Mississippi, United States
- Meeting place: Old Mississippi State Capitol
- Term: 2 January 1900 – 5 January 1904
- Election: 1899 Mississippi elections

Mississippi State Senate
- Members: 45
- President: James T. Harrison
- President pro tempore: John R. Dinsmore (1900 session); William Gwin Kiger (1902 session)
- Party control: Democratic

Mississippi House of Representatives
- Members: 133
- Speaker: A. J. Russell
- Party control: Democratic

Sessions
- 1st: 2 January 1900 – 12 March 1900
- 2nd: 7 January 1902 – 5 March 1902

The 1900–1904 Mississippi Legislature was convened in two sessions: a regular session that lasted from January 2, 1900 to March 12, 1900, and a special session that lasted from January 7, 1902, to March 5, 1902.

== History ==
Members were elected on November 7, 1899, for four-year terms. The 1900–1904 Legislature met in two sessions. The term's first session, and the legislature's 76th overall, met on January 2, 1900, for both houses. This was considered a regular session. That session ended when both houses adjourned on March 12, 1900. During this session, the legislature passed a bill funding 1 million dollars for the construction of a new state capitol building.

The term's second and final session, and the legislature's 77th overall, met on January 7, 1902. This was called as a special session. The Senate adjourned on March 5, 1902. This was the last Mississippi Legislature session held in the Old Mississippi State Capitol, as the state government moved to the new and current Mississippi State Capitol in September 1903. The term officially ended when members were sworn in for the 1904–1908 session on January 5, 1904.

== Officers ==
=== Senate ===
J. H. Jones, as Lieutenant Governor, served as President of the Senate at the start of the term. Senate officers were elected on the first day of the session. First, elections of offices held by non-senators were held. John Y. Murry Jr. was unanimously elected Secretary of the Senate. A. R. Govan was elected Sergeant-at-Arms, defeating three other candidates in three ballots. H. J. Thornton was then elected Door-Keeper in four ballots.

Next, the election for President pro tempore was held. Twelfth District senator William Gwin Kiger nominated 16th District senator John R. Dinsmore for the office, and 25th District senator S. M. Meek seconded the nomination. A voice vote was held. Dinsmore won the office, with 42 of 45 senators voting for him. (Two senators, Wesley G. Evans and W. P. S. Ventress, were absent that day, and Dinsmore voted for Kiger.) Later during the 1900 session, the newly inaugurated Lieutenant Governor James T. Harrison replaced Jones as Senate President.

Dinsmore died in office on April 27, 1900. On the second day of the 1902 session (January 8), the Senate elected a new President pro tempore. Edmond Noel nominated Kiger. Richard Abbay nominated 30th District senator E. H. Moore, and Elias A. Rowan seconded Moore's nomination. Moore then requested his nomination be withdrawn from consideration. Then a ballot vote was held. As the only candidate remaining, Kiger won the election with 37 senators voting for him, and 7 absent or not voting. Kiger was then sworn in as president pro tempore for the 1902 session.

=== House ===
Officer elections were held on the first day of the 1900 session. Washington County representative E. N. Thomas nominated Lauderdale County representative A. J. Russell for Speaker pro tempore, and Russell was elected unanimously. Alcorn County representative T. N. Underwood nominated L. Pink Smith to be the House Clerk pro tempore (a non-representative-held position), and Smith was also elected unanimously. Then, elections for permanent positions were held. Russell was nominated and then won the election for Speaker with a 130-3 vote, with two members absent and Russell not voting. Smith was then elected House Clerk with a 131-2 vote and the same absent representatives not voting.

== Personnel ==
=== Senate ===
Forty-five senators were elected to represent 38 different districts. All senators were Democrats. Three senators were sworn in during the 1902 session to fill vacancies.

District Number	Counties	Senator Name	Residence
1	Hancock, Harrison, Jackson	Wesley G. Evans	Mississippi City
2	Wayne, Jones, Perry, Greene	F. M. Sheppard	Henderson
3	Jasper, Clarke	B. W. Sharbrough	Paulding
4	Simpson, Covington, Marion, Pearl River	Albert W. Dent	Westville
5	Rankin, Smith	William H. Hughes	Raleigh
6	Pike, Franklin	J. H. McGehee	Little Springs
7	Amite, Wilkinson	W. P. S. Ventress	Woodville
8	Lincoln, Lawrence	Charles Chrisman	Brookhaven
9	Adams	James A. Clinton	Natchez
10	Claiborne, Jefferson	William D. Torrey (1900)	Fayette
10	Claiborne, Jefferson	T. M. Shelton (1902)	
11	Copiah	Elias Alford Rowan	Wesson
12	Hinds, Warren	Richard L. Bradley	Bolton
12	Hinds, Warren	William Gwin Kiger	Brunswick
12	Hinds, Warren	Ramsey Wharton	Jackson
13	Scott, Newton	John B. Bailey	Conehatta
14	Lauderdale	Chris C. Dunn	Meridian
15	Kemper, Winston	James R. Key	Oak Grove
16	Noxubee	John R. Dinsmore (1900)	Macon
16	Noxubee	A. T. Dent (1902)	
17	Leake, Neshoba	George E. Wilson	Philadelphia
18	Madison	Robert C. Lee	Madison Station
19	Yazoo	Allen M. Hicks	Myrleville
20	Sharkey, Issaquena	Lorraine C. Dulaney	Duncansby
21	Holmes	Edmond F. Noel	Lexington
22	Attala	Wiley Sanders	Kosciusko
23	Oktibbeha, Choctaw	Lem T. Seawright	Ackerman
24	Clay, Webster	J. Walter Heard	West Point
25	Lowndes	Samuel M. Meek	Columbus
26	Carroll, Montgomery	Alfred H. George	Carrollton
27	Leflore, Tallahatchie	Artemus F. Gardner	Greenwood
28	Yalobusha, Grenada	Benjamin C. Adams	Grenada
29	Washington, Sunflower	Robert B. Campbell	Greenville
29	Washington, Sunflower	William B. Martin	Indianola
30	Bolivar	Edward H. Moore	Rosedale
31	Chickasaw, Calhoun, Pontotoc	Nathan B. Crawford	Atlanta
31	Chickasaw, Calhoun, Pontotoc	Joseph I. Ballinger (1900)	Pittsboro
31	Chickasaw, Calhoun, Pontotoc	T. W. Young (1902)	
32	Lafayette	John W. T. Falkner	Oxford
33	Panola	Archibald S. Yarbrough	Como
34	Coahoma, Tunica, Quitman	R. F. Abbay	Commerce
35	DeSoto	Leonard J. Farley	Hernando
36	Tate, Benton	Thomas L. Cooper	Looxahama
36	Marshall	Sam Hinton	Mount Pleasant
36	Union, Tippah	Gaston L. Jones	New Albany
37	Tishomingo, Alcorn, Prentiss	James O. Looney	Jacinto
38	Monroe	Henry F. Broyles	Greenwood Springs
38	Lee, Itawamba	Leroy T. Taylor	Verona

=== House ===
In the 1900 session, the House had 131 Democrats and 2 Populists. In the 1902 session, five new members were sworn in to fill vacancies.

County District	Representative	Political Party
Adams	Calvin S. Bennett	Democrat
Adams	Ernest E. Brown	Democrat
Alcorn	Hosea H. Ray	Democrat
Alcorn	Thompson H. Underwood	Democrat
Amite	W. I. Causey	Democrat
Amite	D. S. McDaniel	Democrat
Attala	T. Percy Guyton (1900)	Democrat
Attala	Arthur Reynolds (1902)	Democrat
Attala	J. F. Allen	Democrat
Benton	W. G. Gibson	Democrat
Bolivar	J. M. Goff	Democrat
Bolivar	George B. Shelby	Democrat
Calhoun	D. C. Cooner	Democrat
Calhoun	T. M. Murphree	Democrat
Carroll	L. S. Hemphill	Democrat
Carroll	S. E. Turner	Democrat
Chickasaw	J. R. Gilfoy	Democrat
Chickasaw	L. P. Haley	Democrat
Choctaw	James P. McCafferty	Democrat
Claiborne	Edgar Foster	Democrat
Clarke	Arista Johnston	Democrat
Clay	H. L. Ford	Democrat
Clay	J. G. Millsaps	Democrat
Coahoma	J. S. Ham	Democrat
Coahoma	W. A. Alcorn, Jr.	Democrat
Copiah	Luke L. Brittain	Democrat
Copiah	J. J. Ellis	Democrat
Copiah	J. C. Smylie	Democrat
Covington	J. E. Byrd	Democrat
DeSoto	Mial Wall	Democrat
DeSoto	J. M. Granberry	Democrat
Franklin	T. K. Magee	Populist
Greene	John A. Smith	Democrat
Grenada	R. W. McAfee	Democrat
Hancock	E. J. Bowers	Democrat
Harrison	F. W. Elmer	Democrat
Hinds	J. A. P. Campbell Jr.	Democrat
Hinds	H. Clay Sharkey	Democrat
Hinds	L. A. Moss	Democrat
Holmes	S. M. Smith	Democrat
Holmes	J. B. Mitchell	Democrat
Holmes	J. W. Swinney	Democrat
Issaquena	John W. Heath	Democrat
Itawamba	William H. Brown	Democrat
Jackson	J. A. Broadus	Democrat
Jasper	E. A. White	Democrat
Jefferson	W. B. Alsworth	Democrat
Jefferson	Hugh McManus	Democrat
Kemper	John K. Stennis	Democrat
Kemper	N. M. Pace	Democrat
Lafayette	G. R. Hightower	Democrat
Lafayette	Fielder Webster	Democrat
Lauderdale	A. J. Russell	Democrat
Lauderdale	Joseph D. Stennis	Democrat
Lauderdale	W. R. Denton	Democrat
Lawrence	J. J. Denson	Democrat
Leake	Pres Groves	Democrat
Lee	Robert Gambrell	Democrat
Lee	Robert L. Birmingham	Democrat
Leflore	S. R. Coleman	Democrat
Lowndes	M. A. Franklin	Democrat
Lowndes	J. T. Senter	Democrat
Lowndes	Jacob H. Sharp	Democrat
Madison	A. P. Hill	Democrat
Madison	W. S. McAllister	Democrat
Marion	N. C. Hathorn	Populist
Marshall	John M. Eddins	Democrat
Marshall	Hugh Mahon	Democrat
Marshall	Merach Franklin	Democrat
Monroe	A. A. Posey	Democrat
Monroe	John W. Thompson	Democrat
Monroe	E. R. Wren	Democrat
Montgomery	J. P. Taylor	Democrat
Neshoba	J. C. Long	Democrat
Newton	Floyd Loper	Democrat
Newton	W. S. Ferguson	Democrat
Noxubee	W. J. Hubbard	Democrat
Noxubee	W. S. Permenter	Democrat
Noxubee	H. H. Brooks	Democrat
Oktibbeha	J. W. Norment	Democrat
Oktibbeha	J. W. Crumpton	Democrat
Panola	A. S. Kyle	Democrat
Panola	D. B. Arnold	Democrat
Panola	C. O. McCarthy (1900)	Democrat
Panola	J. M. Cox (1902)	Democrat
Pearl River	H. K. Rouse	Democrat
Perry	S. T. Garraway	Democrat
Pike	Percy E. Quin	Democrat
Pike	J. M. Tate (1900)	Democrat
Pike	John A. Walker (1902)	Democrat
Pontotoc	D. C. Langston	Democrat
Pontotoc	J. I. Longest	Democrat
Prentiss	W. M. Cox	Democrat
Prentiss	L. M. Burge	Democrat
Quitman	M. E. Denton	Democrat
Rankin	H. W. Bradshaw	Democrat
Rankin	Bee King	Democrat
Scott	H. H. Harper	Democrat
Sharkey	Anthony Miller	Democrat
Simpson	Ira J. Stamps	Democrat
Smith	J. J. Stubbs	Democrat
Sunflower	S. D. Neill	Democrat
Tallahatchie	Thomas B. Dudley	Democrat
Tate	Joseph T. Clayton	Democrat
Tate	S. W. Jones	Democrat
Tippah	A. C. Anderson	Democrat
Tishomingo	John A. Pyle	Democrat
Tunica	E. L. Irby	Democrat
Union	R. M. Frazer	Democrat
Union	C. Lee Crum	Democrat
Warren	George Anderson (1900)	Democrat
Warren	T. R. Foster (1902)	Democrat
Warren	William J. Vollor	Democrat
Warren	O. S. Robbins	Democrat
Washington	E. N. Thomas	Democrat
Washington	Stephen Castleman	Democrat
Washington	Frank E. Larkin (1900)	Democrat
Washington	Van Buren Boddie (1902)	Democrat
Wayne	Jesse W. Wilkins	Democrat
Webster	T. L. Lamb	Democrat
Wilkinson	W. F. Tucker Jr.	Democrat
Wilkinson	H. M. Quin	Democrat
Winston	J. D. Doss	Democrat
Yalobusha	James Moore	Democrat
Yalobusha	T. J. McFarland	Democrat
Yazoo	W. W. Coody	Democrat
Yazoo	C. J. Burrus	Democrat
Yazoo	H. G. Johnson	Democrat
Floater Representatives		Democrat
Franklin and Lincoln	A. M. Dodds	Democrat
Benton and Tippah	S. Joe Owen	Democrat
Claiborne and Jefferson	R. W. Magruder	Democrat
Clarke and Jasper	James B. Evans	Democrat
Grenada and Montgomery	W. T. McCuiston	Democrat
Leake and Winston	John F. Sharp	Democrat
Harrison and Jackson	George P. Hewes	Democrat
Lee and Itawamba	A. T. Galloway	Democrat
Hinds and Yazoo	J. W. George	Democrat
