= 1904–1908 Mississippi Legislature =

←	1900–1904 Mississippi Legislature	1908–1912 Mississippi Legislature	→

Overview
- Legislative body: Mississippi Legislature
- Jurisdiction: Mississippi, United States
- Meeting place: Mississippi State Capitol
- Term: 5 January 1904 – 7 January 1908
- Election: 1903 Mississippi elections

Mississippi State Senate
- Members: 45
- President: John Prentiss Carter
- President pro tempore: E. H. Moore
- Party control: Democratic

Mississippi House of Representatives
- Members: 133
- Speaker: Emmet Thomas
- Party control: Democratic

Sessions
- 1st: 5 January 1904 – 22 March 1904
- 2nd: 2 January 1906 – 21 April 1906

The 1904–1908 Mississippi Legislature was convened in two sessions, the first between January 5, 1904, and March 22, 1904, and the second between January 2, 1906 and April 21, 1906.

== History ==
Members were elected on November 3, 1903. The House and the Senate first convened on January 5, 1904. That session adjourned on March 22, 1904. During that session, laws were passed mandating a "uniform series of school books", racial segregation on street cars, creating Lamar County, and authorizing a law code for 1906. They also authorized appropriations for new buildings for the Mississippi Institution for the Deaf and Dumb after the old dormitory was destroyed by fire on March 18, 1902.

A second session was held between January 2, 1906, and April 21, 1906. The term officially ended when the 1908-1912 session began on January 7, 1908.

James K. Vardaman served as governor during this term.

== Officers ==
=== Senate ===
John Prentiss Carter, as lieutenant governor, served ex officio as President of the Senate. E. H. Moore was near-unanimously elected President Pro Tempore of the Senate. John Y. Murry, Jr. served as Secretary, P. M B. Self served as Sergeant-at-Arms, and H. J. Thornton served as Doorkeeper.

=== House ===
Emmet Thomas was elected Speaker of the House. L. Pink Smith served as Clerk, A. H. Hutchinson served as Sergeant-at-Arms, and the Doorkeepers were Elias Phillips and John Barfield.

== Senate ==
All members were Democrats. Several new members joined in 1906.

District Number	Counties	Senator Name	Residence
1	Hancock, Harrison, Jackson	Horace Bloomfield	Scranton
2	Wayne, Jones, Perry, Greene	J. T. Parks (1904)	Hattiesburg
2	Wayne, Jones, Perry, Greene	R. S. Hall (1906)	Hattiesburg
3	Jasper, Clarke	D. W. Heidelberg	Shubuta
4	Simpson, Covington, Marion, Pearl River	Henry Mounger	Columbia
5	Rankin, Smith	Patrick Henry	Brandon
6	Pike, Franklin	Clem V. Ratcliff	Summit
7	Amite, Wilkinson	Charles H. Frith	Bates Mill
8	Lincoln, Lawrence	G. Wood Magee	Monticello
9	Adams	James A. Clinton (1904)	Natchez
9	Adams	Gerard Brandon (1906)	Natchez
10	Claiborne, Jefferson	Stephen Thrasher	Port Gibson
11	Copiah	M. S. McNeil	Crystal Springs
12	Hinds, Warren	W. K. McLaurin	Vicksburg
12	Hinds, Warren	Murry F. Smith	Vicksburg
12	Hinds, Warren	W. J. Croom	Bolton
13	Scott, Newton	J. M. Stephenson (1904)	Morton
13	Scott, Newton	Oliver McIlhenny (1906)	Forrest
14	Lauderdale	C. C. Dunn	Meridian
15	Kemper, Winston	J. D. Doss	Louisville
16	Noxubee	A. T. Dent	Macon
17	Leake, Neshoba	Presley Groves	Ofahoma
18	Madison	H. B. Greaves	Canton
19	Yazoo	A. M. Hicks	Myrleville
20	Sharkey, Issaquena	H. J. McLaurin	Rolling Fork
21	Holmes	H. H. Elmore	Lexington
22	Attala	Wiley Sanders	Kosciusko
23	Oktibbeha, Choctaw	W. W. Magruder	Starkville
24	Clay, Webster	W. R. Scott	Eupora
25	Lowndes	M. A. Franklin	Columbus
26	Carroll, Montgomery	G. A. McLean	Winona
27	Leflore, Tallahatchie	C. E. Harris	Sumner
28	Yalobusha, Grenada	James Moore	Oakland
29	Washington, Sunflower	W. W. Stone	Greenville
29	Washington, Sunflower	John L. Hebron	Greenville
30	Bolivar	E. H. Moore	Rosedale
31	Chickasaw, Calhoun, Pontotoc	James Gordon	Okolona
31	Chickasaw, Calhoun, Pontotoc	C. E. Franklin	Pontotoc
32	Lafayette	G. R. Hightower	Oxford
33	Panola	A. S. Yarbrough	Como
34	Coahoma, Tunica, Quitman	J. A. Glover	Clarksdale
35	DeSoto	Leonard J. Farley	Hernando
36	Tate, Benton, Marshall, Union, Tippah	R. D. Simpson	Pegram
36	Tate, Benton, Marshall, Union, Tippah	W. A. Boyd	Gossett
36	Tate, Benton, Marshall, Union, Tippah	W. A. Belk	Holly Springs
37	Tishomingo, Alcorn, Prentiss	Carroll Kendrick	Kendrick
38	Monroe	W. B. Walker (died 1903)	Aberdeen
38	Monroe	R. E. Houston (1904-)	Aberdeen
38	Lee, Itawamba	J. M. Weaver	Rara Avis

== House ==
Emmet N. Thomas was elected Speaker of the House on January 5, 1904. Several new members joined in 1906. All members were Democrats.

County District	Representative	Residence
Adams	E. E. Brown	Natchez
Adams	C. N. Winston	Stanton
Alcorn	T. J. Dalton	Rienzi
Alcorn	G. W. Bynum	Corinth
Amite	Edward J. Forman	Nat
Amite	Polk Talbert	Gloster
Attala	John F. Allen	Hallum
Attala	Arthur Reynolds	Ethel
Benton	R. M. Owen	Ashland
Bolivar	J. C. Burrus	Bennoit
Bolivar	Julius Lesser	Duncan
Calhoun	T. M. Murphree (1904)	Pittsboro
Calhoun	T. L. Beadles (1906)	Pittsboro
Calhoun	J. L. Bates	Pittsboro
Carroll	S. E. Turner	Vaiden
Carroll	A. J. Coleman	Emory
Chickasaw	N. W. Bradford	Houston
Chickasaw	J. R. Gilfoy	Woodland
Choctaw	Lafayette Robinson	Ackerman
Claiborne	J. W. Clark	Hermanville
Clarke	W. M. Estes	Enterprise
Clay	John G. Millsaps	West Point
Clay	J. E. Caradine	Montpelier
Coahoma	W. A. Alcorn	Clarksdale
Coahoma	John A. Suddoth	Friars Point
Copiah	J. B. Errington	Hazlehurst
Copiah	W. B. Lockwood	Crystal Springs
Copiah	E. C. McMichael	Wesson
Covington	G. W. Holloway	Mt. Carmel
DeSoto	Julius R. Tipton	Hernando
DeSoto	A. S. Meharg	Eudora
Franklin	S. P. Butler	Little Springs
Greene	Dan McLeod	Leakesville
Grenada	S. A. Morrison	Grenada
Hancock	J. Q. Fountain	Pearlington
Harrison	E. M. Barber	Biloxi
Hinds	W. C. Wells Jr.	Jackson
Hinds	J. C. Ward	Jackson
Hinds	Paul D. Ratliff	Raymond
Holmes	S. M. Smith	Lexington
Holmes	H. S. Hooker Jr.	Lexington
Holmes	S. N. Sample	Ebenezer
Issaquena	L. C. Dulaney	Grace
Itawamba	W. S. Sheffield	Dorsey
Jackson	W. D. Bullard	Scranton
Jasper	W. J. McFarland	Paulding'
Jefferson	C. W. Whitney Jr.	Fayette
Jones	Henry Hilbun	Ellisville
Kemper	G. H. Ethridge	DeKalb
Kemper	A. E. Grantham (1904)	Enondale
Kemper	S. D. Stennis (1906)	Mt. Nebo
Lamar	J. R. Holcomb (1906)	Purvis
Lafayette	D. M. Kimbrough	Oxford
Lafayette	M. C. Denton	Tula
Lauderdale	W. R. Denton	Hookston
Lauderdale	J. D. Stennis	Bailey
Lauderdale	S. B. Watts	Meridian
Lawrence	E. L. H. Bird	Tryus
Leake	W. A. Ellis	Carthage
Lee	J. M. Hoyle	Tupelo
Lee	P. E. Caruthers	Tupelo
Leflore	S. R. Coleman	Greenwood
Lincoln	V. B. Watts	Brookhaven
Lowndes	P. W. Maer	Columbus
Lowndes	J. I. Sturdivant	Columbus
Lowndes	A. J. Ervin	Crawford
Madison	Clarence B. Greaves	Flora
Madison	R. Sidney Powell	Canton
Marion	S. J. Hathorn	Columbia
Marshall	R. L. Tucker	Chulahoma
Marshall	John M. Eddins	Byhalia
Marshall	H. K. Mahon	Holly Springs
Monroe	E. E. Cowley	Amory
Monroe	Ben McFarland	Aberdeen
Monroe	D. A. Beeks	Quincey
Montgomery	W. T. McCuiston (1904)	Sweatman
Montgomery	S. I. Robinson (1906)	Winona
Neshoba	R. L. Breland	Philadelphia
Newton	Floyd Loper (1904)	Conehatta
Newton	Thomas Keith (1906)	Decatur
Newton	J. R. Byrd	Newton
Noxubee	H. H. Brooks	Macon
Noxubee	E. D. Cavett	Macon
Noxubee	E. C. Patty	Macon
Oktibbeha	James W. Norment	Starkville
Oktibbeha	Joseph W. Crumpton	Sturges
Panola	A. S. Kyle	Bateville
Panola	N. C. Knox	Reynolds
Panola	D. B. Arnold	Popes
Pearl River	H. K. Rouse	Poplarville
Perry	Hiram S. Stevens	Hattiesburg
Pike	W. W. Pope	Tylertown
Pike	W. B. Mixon	McComb City
Pontotoc	J. B. Fontaine	Pontotoc
Pontotoc	F. M. Lantrip (1904)	Thaxton
Pontotoc	W. T. Stegall (1906)	Plymouth
Prentiss	J. A. Cunningham	Marietta
Prentiss	L. M. Burge	Baldwyn
Quitman	T. E. Williams	Belen
Rankin	J. S. Roberts	Langford
Rankin	J. C. Robinson	Pisgah
Scott	A. N. Cooper	Forest
Sharkey	Anthony Miller	Panther Burn
Simpson	J. D. Wilkinson	Magee
Smith	Thomas Mayfield	Taylorsville
Sunflower	W. E. Ringold	Linn
Tallahatchie	J. S. Thompson	Charleston
Tate	W. J. East	Senatobia
Tate	S. T. Clayton (1904)	Strayhorn
Tate	T. C. House (1906)	Senatobia
Tippah	James Duncan	Ripley
Tishomingo	D. L. Ross	Iuka
Tunica	C. W. Doherty	Tunica
Union	J. C. Patterson	Cotton Plant
Union	R. S. Bell	Avenelle
Warren	S. N. Collier	Vicksburg
Warren	O. S. Robbins	Vicksburg
Warren	T. R. Foster	Vicksburg
Washington	E. N. Thomas	Greenville
Washington	R. W. Garrison	Leland
Washington	Percy Bell (1904)	Greenville
Washington	Van Buren Boddie (1906)	Greenville
Wayne	W. M. McAlister	Waynesboro
Webster	J. W. Spencer	Glenlyn
Wilkinson	W. F. Tucker	Woodville
Wilkinson	D. M. Huff	Woodville
Winston	W. C. Hight	Louisville
Yalobusha	J. G. McGowan	Water Valley
Yalobusha	J. Mel Smith	Coffeeville
Yazoo	J. W. George	Yazoo City
Yazoo	W. W. Coody	Phoenix
Yazoo	Fayette Caruthers	Yazoo City
Floater Representatives
Franklin and Lincoln	T. H. Montgomery	Brookhaven
Benton and Tippah	J. B. Blackwell	Finger
Claiborne and Jefferson	J. S. Hicks	Fayette
Clarke and Jasper	W. W. Heidelberg	Heidelberg
Grenada and Montgomery	W. S. P. Doty	Grenada
Leake and Winston	W. L. Evans	Madden
Harrison and Jackson	R. C. Cowan	Scranton
Lee and Itawamba	Guy W. Mitchell	Guntown
Hinds and Yazoo	W. J. McGee	Jackson
