= Senator Clinton =

Senator Clinton may refer to:

== Members of the United States Senate ==
- Hillary Clinton (born 1947), U.S. Senator from New York 2001–2009; also Secretary of State (2009–2013), First Lady (1993–2001), and 2016 Democratic Party nominee for President
- DeWitt Clinton (1769–1828), U.S. Senator from New York 1802–1803; also Mayor of New York City (1803–1807, 1808–1810, 1811–1815) and Governor of New York (1817–1822, 1825–1828)

== United States state senate members ==
- Frederick Albert Clinton (1834–1890), South Carolina State Senate
- George Henry Clinton (fl. 1900s–1920s), Louisiana State Senate
- James A. Clinton (1864–1907), Mississippi State Senate

== See also ==
- Clinton (surname) for others
