= Murray F. Smith =

American politician from Mississippi (1850–1909)

Member of the Mississippi State Senate from the 12th district
- In office January 5, 1904 – January 7, 1908 Serving with W. K. McLaurin, W. J. Croom
- Preceded by: William Gwin Kiger; Richard L. Bradley; Ramsey Wharton
- Succeeded by: W. K. McLaurin; Clayton D. Potter; J. R. McDowell
- In office January 7, 1896 – January 2, 1900 Serving with B. H. Wells, William Gwin Kiger
- Preceded by: C. M. Williamson; William Gwin Kiger; W. D. Carmichael
- Succeeded by: William Gwin Kiger; Richard L. Bradley; Ramsey Wharton

Member of the Mississippi House of Representatives from the Warren County district
- In office January 1888 – January 1890

Personal details
- Born: January 17, 1850 Milton, North Carolina, U. S.
- Died: September 27, 1909 (aged 59) Vicksburg, Mississippi, U. S.
- Party: Democratic

Murray Forbes Smith (January 17, 1850 – September 27, 1909) was an American politician. He represented the 12th District in the Mississippi State Senate from 1896 to 1900 and from 1904 to 1908.

== Early life ==
Murray Forbes Smith was born on January 17, 1850, in Milton, North Carolina. He was the son of George Alexander Smith (died 1869) and Adeline (McGehee) Smith (died 1858). Smith entered the Bingham School in Oaks, North Carolina. He then attended Washington College and did not graduate. He then studied under R. M. Pearson in Richmond Hill, North Carolina. He was then admitted to the North Carolina bar in January 1872.

== Career ==
Smith practiced law between 1872 and 1874 in Greensboro, North Carolina. He then moved to Vicksburg, Mississippi, in 1874. He then entered the law firm of W. B. & A. B. Pittman. After that firm ended, Smith entered the law firm of T. M. Miller and Joseph Hirsh, named Smith, Hirsh, & Landau. In 1887, Smith was elected to represent Warren County as a Democrat in the Mississippi House of Representatives for the 1888-1890 term. Smith was then part of Mississippi's 1890 Constitutional Convention. He was then a delegate from the state at large to the 1892 Democratic National Convention. On November 7, 1895, Smith was elected to represent the 12th District (Hinds and Warren Counties) in the Mississippi State Senate for the 1896-1900 term. On November 3, 1903, Smith was re-elected to the Senate for the 1904-1908 term. During this term, Smith was a member of the following committees: Constitution; Railroads & Finances; Corporations; and Insurance.

== Personal life and death ==
Smith was an Episcopalian. He was a member of the Freemasons, Odd Fellows, Knights of Pythias, and Elks. Smith married Kate Wilson on April 14, 1874. They had five children, named Victor Conway, Murray Forbes, Ada McGehee, Clarence Carroll, and Lomie Lee. He died at his home in Vicksburg at 3:25 PM of a "lingering illness" on September 27, 1909. He was survived by all five of his children.
