= W. J. Croom =

Former American politician

Member of the Mississippi State Senate from the 12th district
- In office January 5, 1904 – January 7, 1908 Serving with W. K. McLaurin, Murray F. Smith
- Preceded by: William Gwin Kiger; Richard L. Bradley; Ramsey Wharton
- Succeeded by: W. K. McLaurin; Clayton D. Potter; J. R. McDowell

Personal details
- Born: November 2, 1865 Greensboro, Alabama, U. S.
- Died: November 18, 1915 (aged 50) Jackson, Mississippi, U. S.
- Party: Democratic

Wiley Jones Croom (November 2, 1865 - November 18, 1915) was an American politician and lawyer. He represented the 12th District in the Mississippi State Senate from 1904 to 1908.

== Early life ==
Wiley Jones Croom was born on November 2, 1865, in Greensboro, Alabama. He was the son of Platt Sylvester Croom (1829–1889), a doctor, and Sarah (Drew) Croom. Croom attended primary schools in Greensboro, Alabama; and Sallis, Mississippi. He then studied law under his uncle, John L. Croom, in Matagorda, Texas. Croom was admitted to the bar in December 1885.

== Career ==
Croom started practicing law in Matagorda, Texas. He then moved to Bolton, Mississippi. In 1891, he started a law firm with Ben Wells, which was later renamed to Williamson, Wells, and Croom. In 1896, Croom moved to Jackson, Mississippi. Croom ran to represent the 12th District in the Mississippi State Senate as a Democrat for the 1904-1908 term. He won the Democratic nomination unopposed on August 3, 1903. Croom won the general election on November 3, 1903. During the term, Croom served on the following committees: Printing; Railroads & Franchises; Federal Relations; Penitentiary & Prisons; Humane & Benevolent Institutions; and the Joint Committee Investigating State Officers. Croom did not run for re-election. After his Senate term, Croom began heavily investing in Jackson real estate. He purchased three buildings on Jackson's Capitol Street. He also had plans to expand his buildings. He also continued working as a criminal lawyer. Croom died of apoplexy at 7 PM on November 18, 1915, in Jackson, Mississippi.

== Personal life ==
Croom was a Baptist. He was a member of the Freemasons and the Knights of Pythias. Croom married Mary Andrews on February 22, 1891, in Flora, Mississippi. They had no children.
