= Senator McLaurin =

Senator McLaurin may refer to:

== Members of the United States Senate ==
- Anselm J. McLaurin (1848–1909), U.S. Senator from Mississippi from 1894 to 1895
- John L. McLaurin (1860–1934), U.S. Senator from South Carolina from 1897 to 1903

== United States state senate members ==
- Gene McLaurin (fl. 1990s–2010s), North Carolina State Senate
- H. J. McLaurin (1853–1909), Mississippi State Senate
- Josh McLaurin (born 1988), Georgia State Senate
- W. K. McLaurin (1857–1915), Mississippi State Senate
