= Ventress =

Ventress is a surname. Notable people with the surname include:

- James Alexander Ventress (1805–1867), lawyer, inventor, plantation owner, and state legislator in Mississippi
- Peter Ventress (born 1960), British businessman
- W. P. S. Ventress (1854–1911), American politician

== See also ==
- PC Alf Ventress, a character in Heartbeat (British TV series)
- Asajj Ventress, a fictional character in Star Wars
- Ventress, Louisiana, a town in the United States
- Ventress Correctional Facility, in Alabama
