= Senator Magruder (disambiguation) =

Allan B. Magruder (1775–1822) was a U.S. Senator from New Mexico from 1812 to 1813. Senator Magruder may also refer to:

- Richard H. Magruder (died 1884), Maryland State Senate
- W. W. Magruder (1867–1934), Mississippi State Senate
