= H. J. McLaurin =

American politician

Member of the Mississippi State Senate from the 20th district
- In office January 5, 1904 – January 7, 1908
- Preceded by: L. C. Dulaney
- Succeeded by: H. P. Farish
- In office January 7, 1896 – January 2, 1900
- Preceded by: E. N. Scudder
- Succeeded by: L. C. Dulaney

Personal details
- Born: February , 1853 Smith County, Mississippi, U. S.
- Died: October 12, 1909 (aged 56) Rolling Fork, Mississippi, U. S.
- Party: Democratic
- Relations: Anselm McLaurin, W. K. McLaurin (brothers)

Horace Jehu "Gee" McLaurin (February 1853 - October 12, 1909) was an American politician and lawyer. He represented the 20th District in the Mississippi State Senate from 1896 to 1900, and from 1904 to 1908.

== Early life ==
Horace Jehu McLaurin was born in February 1853 in Smith County, Mississippi. He was the son of Laughlin McLaurin and the third of eight brothers, who included Mississippi governor Anselm J. McLaurin. He grew up on a farm. He attended Smith County's public schools. Then, McLaurin attended the Summerville Institute. He then read law.

== Career ==
McLaurin moved to Rolling Fork, Mississippi, and began practicing law there. He also owned plantations near Deer Creek. He was a delegate from Sharkey County to Mississippi's 1890 Constitutional Convention. He was one of 8 delegates to vote against the constitution's adoption; however, he signed the constitution after it was adopted.

In 1895, McLaurin was elected to represent the 20th District (Sharkey and Issaquena Counties) as a Democrat in the Mississippi State Senate for the 1896–1900 term. During that term, he served on the following committees: Constitution; Judiciary; Registration & Elections; and Levees, of which he was the chairman. On November 3, 1903, McLaurin was re-elected to the Senate for the 1904-1908 term. During this term, McLaurin served on the following committees: Judiciary; Agriculture; Commerce & Manufactures; Banks & Banking; Humane & Benevolent Institutions; and Levees.

McLaurin died suddenly of apoplexy at his Rolling Fork home at 3 AM on October 12, 1909.

== Personal life ==
McLaurin was 5'11" tall and weighed 165 pounds. McLaurin was a Methodist. He married Willie Payne in 1891.
