= Henry Mounger =

American politician and lawyer

Member of the Mississippi State Senate from the 4th district
- In office January 5, 1904 – January 7, 1908
- Preceded by: Albert W. Dent
- Succeeded by: Theodore G. Bilbo

Personal details
- Born: May 15, 1872 Pleasant Hill, Mississippi, U. S.
- Died: August 30, 1928 (aged 56) Columbia, Mississippi, U. S.
- Party: Democratic

Henry Mounger (May 15, 1872 - August 30, 1928) was an American politician and lawyer. He represented the 4th District in the Mississippi State Senate from 1904 to 1908.

== Biography ==
Henry Mounger was born on May 15, 1872, in Pleasant Hill, Mississippi. He was the son of Confederate veteran William Harris Mounger and Ardelissia (Terral) Mounger. Henry attended Jasper County's primary schools. He then studied at Chamberlin Hunt Academy in Port Gibson, Mississippi. In 1892, he started studying law under T. S. Ford's office. He then became a teacher for 11 months. Mounger then attended the University of Mississippi's Law School in 1893, graduating with a L.L.B. in 1894. Mounger graduated with special distinction. He was admitted to the bar in 1894. After graduating, Mounger began practicing law, first at Hattiesburg, then moving to Williamsburg and then to Columbia. At Columbia, he had a law firm with his brother Edwin H. Mounger (b. 1870), called Mounger & Mounger. He served as the County Attorney of Marion County for a four-year term. In 1903, Mounger ran to represent the 4th District (Simpson, Covington, Marion, and Pearl River Counties), for the 1904-1908 term. Mounger won the Democratic nomination on August 27, 1903. He then won the general election on November 3, 1903. During that term, Mounger served on the following committees: Judiciary; Constitution; Local & Private Legislation; Education; and the Joint Committee on Executive Contingent Fund. By 1918, Mounger was a partner in the Mounger & Ford law firm alongside R. D. Ford. Mounger died on August 30, 1928, in Columbia, Mississippi, and was buried there.

== Personal life ==
Mounger was a member of the Methodist Episcopal Church, South. He was also a member of the Freemasons, Knights of Pythias, and Woodmen of the World. Mounger married Ora Hubbard on June 10, 1896. Their son, Henry Mounger Jr., was born on July 24, 1897.
