= Senator Brandon =

Senator Brandon may refer to:

- Doug Brandon (1932–1992), Arkansas State Senate
- Gerard Brandon (state senator) (1861–1956), Mississippi State Senate
