= Fentress =

Fentress may refer to:

== People ==
- Curtis Fentress, (born 1947), American architect, founded Fentress Architects in Denver, Colorado
- Elizabeth Fentress (born 1948), Roman archaeologist who specialises in Italy and North Africa
- Francis Fentress (1873–1930), justice of the Tennessee Supreme Court
- John Fentress Gardner (1912–1998), American author and educator
- Paul Fentress (1913–1983), American field hockey player

== Places ==
- Fentress, Texas, unincorporated community in Caldwell County, Texas, United States
- Fentress County, Tennessee, county in the U.S. state of Tennessee
- National Register of Historic Places listings in Fentress County, Tennessee
- Naval Auxiliary Landing Field Fentress, U.S. military use airport in Fentress, Chesapeake, Virginia

== Other ==
- Fentress Architects, international design studio
- USS Fentress (AK-180), Alamosa-class cargo ship acquired by the U.S. Navy during the final months of World War II

== See also ==
- Ventress (disambiguation)
