= Eagle Bend =

Eagle Bend may refer to a community in the United States:

- Eagle Bend, Minnesota, a small city
- Eagle Bend, Mississippi, an unincorporated place
- Eagle Bend Drive, a street in Southlake, Texas
