= W. K. McLaurin =

American politician (1857–1915)

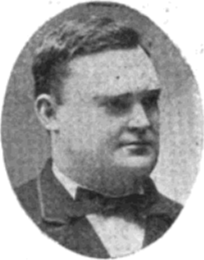
- c. 1908

Member of the Mississippi State Senate from the 12th district
- In office January 5, 1904 – November 1, 1915 Serving with Clayton D. Potter, Stanford Collier (1912-1916) Clayton D. Potter, J. R. McDowell (1908-1912) Murry F. Smith, W. J. Croom (1904-1908)
- Preceded by: Richard L. Bradley; William Gwin Kiger; Ramsey Wharton
- Succeeded by: Joseph A. Baker; G. Edward Williams; H. K. Murray

Personal details
- Born: March 29, 1857 Smith County, Mississippi, U. S.
- Died: November 1, 1915 (aged 58) Vicksburg, Mississippi, U. S.
- Party: Democratic
- Spouse: Willie Clanton Aden (m. 1892)
- Relations: Anselm J. McLaurin (brother)
- Children: 4

William K. McLaurin (March 29, 1857 - November 1, 1915) was an American politician, lawyer, and judge. He represented the 12th District in the Mississippi State Senate from 1904 to 1915.

== Early life ==
William K. McLaurin was born on March 29, 1857, near Trenton, Smith County, Mississippi. He was the son of Lauchlin McLaurin, a former state representative, and Ellen Caroline (Tullus) McLaurin. He had seven brothers, including Mississippi governor Anselm McLaurin. William attended his county schools and then Mississippi College. He then studied law at his home and was admitted to the bar. He first moved to Rolling Fork and then to Vicksburg to practice law.

== Career ==
McLaurin was appointed Circuit Judge of the Vicksburg district by his brother, Governor Anselm McLaurin, on February 22, 1896. His term ended on February 22, 1900. In January 1902 McLaurin was appointed County Attorney of Warren County. On November 3, 1903, McLaurin was elected to represent the 12th District (Hinds and Warren Counties) as a Democrat in the Mississippi State Senate for the 1904-1908 term. During this term, McLaurin served on the following committees: Judiciary; Claims; and Insurance; and also chaired the County Affairs committee. McLaurin was re-elected in 1907 for the 1908-1912 term. During this term, McLaurin chaired the Insurance committee, and also served on the following committees: Judiciary and Levees. On November 7, 1911, McLaurin was once again re-elected, this time without opposition, to the Senate for the 1912-1916 term. During this term, McLaurin served on the following committees: Judiciary; Levees; Public Works; and Public Lands.

After his Senate term, he once again ran for Circuit Judge, this time for a district comprising Warren, Sharkey, Issaquena, and Claiborne counties. In August 1915, McLaurin was once again a candidate for the legislature, this time to represent Warren County in the Mississippi House of Representatives for the 1916-1920 term. McLaurin advanced to the second round of the Democratic primary. McLaurin died near Vicksburg on November 1, 1915.

== Personal life ==
McLaurin was a member of the Methodist Church. He was also a member of the Knights of Pythias. He married Willie Clanton Aden on November 25, 1892, in Valley Park, Mississippi. They had four children, named Lauchlin, Walter, Lucy Katherine, and Sidney Lee.
