= W. R. Scott =

W. R. Scott may refer to:

- W. R. Scott (publisher), a children's book publishing company based in New York
- W. R. Scott (economist) (1868–1940), political economist
- W. R. Scott (politician) (1868–?), American politician, member of the Mississippi State Senate

== See also ==
- William Scott (disambiguation)
