= Albert Dent =

Albert Dent may refer to:

- Albert W. Dent (1904–1984), administrator of Dillard University and Flint-Goodridge Hospital in New Orleans
- Albert Dent, British naval officer for whom Dent Island (Queensland) was named
- Albert Tatum Dent (1863–1929), American lawyer and politician in Mississippi
