= Senator McIlhenny =

Senator McIlhenny may refer to:

- John Avery McIlhenny (1867–1942), Louisiana State Senate
- Oliver McIlhenny (1861–1928), Mississippi State Senate

== See also ==
- Chuck McIlhinney (born 1967), Pennsylvania State Senate
