= Senator Parks =

Senator Parks may refer to:

- David Parks (politician) (born 1943), Nevada State Senate
- J. T. Parks (1878–1905), Mississippi State Senate
- Rita Potts Parks (born 1962), Mississippi State Senate
- Shirley Parks (1939–2024), Nebraska State Senate
- Walter B. Parks (1868–1930), Mississippi State Senate

== See also ==
- George S. Park (1811–1890), Missouri State Senate
- Nabilah Parkes (born 1989), Georgia State Senate
