= Senator Dent =

Senator Dent may refer to:

- Albert Tatum Dent (1863–1929), Mississippi State Senate
- Charlie Dent (born 1960), Pennsylvania State Senate
- George Dent (1756–1813), Maryland State Senate
- John Herman Dent (1908–1988), Pennsylvania State Senate
