= Presley Groves =

American lawyer and politician (1841-1915)

Member of the Mississippi State Senate from the 17th district
- In office January 1904 – January 1908
- In office January 1888 – January 1892

Member of the Mississippi House of Representatives from the Leake County district
- In office January 1900 – January 1904
- In office January 1886 – January 1888

Personal details
- Born: August 30, 1841 Ofahoma, Mississippi, U. S.
- Died: May 16, 1915 (aged 73) Jackson, Mississippi, U. S.
- Party: Democratic
- Relations: Greenwood Leflore (great-uncle); Ferr Smith (great-grandson)
- Children: 11

Presley Groves (August 30, 1841 - May 16, 1915) was an American lawyer and politician. He served in both houses of the Mississippi Legislature between 1886 and 1908.

== Early life ==
Presley Groves was born on August 30, 1841, in Ofahoma, Mississippi. He was the son of Iredel C. Groves, of Scotch-Irish descent, and Sarah (Leflore) Groves, the daughter of Benjamin Leflore and niece of Choctaw chief Greenwood Leflore, who negotiated the Treaty of Dancing Rabbit Creek in 1830. Presley attended the public schools of Leake County and attended the University of Mississippi, studying law and getting admitted to the bar upon graduation. Groves served under A. P. Hill in the Confederate Army in the Civil War. He was wounded at the Battle of Cold Harbor. During early Reconstruction, he served as a Captain of horsemen under governor William Sharkey.

== Political career ==
Groves served as a justice of the peace for four years in the early 1880s. He was elected to represent Leake County in the Mississippi House of Representatives as a Democrat in 1886. In 1887, he was elected to represent the 17th District in the Mississippi State Senate for the 1888–1892 term. In 1899, Groves was once again elected to the House for the 1900-1904 term. On November 3, 1903, Groves was elected to represent the Senate's 17th District for the 1904–1908 term. During that term, Groves served on the following committees: Finance; Agriculture; Commerce and Manufactures; Public Works; Claims; Unfinished Business; Public Lands; and Pensions. Groves died on May 16, 1915, in Jackson, Mississippi.

== Personal life ==
Groves married Marie Josephine Charles in March 1861. They had seven children: Louis, Mignon, Mamie, Laura, Alpha, Myrtle, and I. C. Groves also had four children by a black mistress surnamed Smith, acknowledged by the family. His great-grandson from that side, Ferr Smith, later also served in the Mississippi House of Representatives.
