= Ferr Smith =

American politician (1941–2023)

Member of the Mississippi House of Representatives from the 27th district
- In office 1993–2016

Personal details
- Born: September 10, 1941 Leake County, Mississippi, United States
- Died: November 5, 2023 (aged 82)
- Party: Democratic

Ferr Smith (born September 10, 1941) was an American lawyer and politician. He represented the 23rd District in the Mississippi House of Representatives, being first elected in 1992 and serving until 2016. He was a member of the Democratic party.

== Personal life ==
Ferr Smith, who was Black, was the great-grandson of Presley Groves, a white legislator who served in the House for Leake County, the same county that Smith served for, in 1886 and again in 1900-1902, as well as serving in the state senate in 1888-1890 and again in 1904-1906. Smith's great-grandmother was Groves's Black mistress. For college, Smith attended Mississippi Valley State, followed by getting a law degree from Ole Miss Law School.
