= Charles H. Frith =

American politician (1838–1912)

Member of the Mississippi State Senate from the 7th district
- In office January 5, 1904 – January 7, 1908
- Preceded by: W. P. S. Ventress
- Succeeded by: William F. Tucker Jr.

Member of the Mississippi House of Representatives from the Amite County district
- In office January 1896 – January 1900

Personal details
- Born: June 14, 1838 Amite County, Mississippi
- Died: December 19, 1912 (aged 74) Liberty, Amite County, Mississippi
- Party: Democrat

Military service
- Allegiance: Confederate States
- Branch/service: Army
- Years of service: 1861–1865
- Rank: First Lieutenant
- Battles/wars: Civil War

Charles Henry Frith (June 14, 1838 - December 19, 1912) was a Democratic Mississippi state legislator from Amite County in the late 19th and early 20th centuries.

== Biography ==
Charles Henry Frith was born on June 14, 1838, in Amite County, Mississippi. He was the son of William Frith and Amand (Simmons) Frith. Frith graduated from Georgetown College in 1859. He enlisted in the 6th Louisiana Infantry Confederate Army during the Civil War. He was a first lieutenant by the end of the war. During the war, he was captured and sent to Fort Delaware, where he was interned until the war ended. In 1895, he was elected to represent Amite County as a Democrat in the Mississippi House of Representatives, for the 1896–1900 term. In 1903, he was elected to the Mississippi State Senate to represent the 7th district, which was composed of Amite and Wilkinson Counties, for the 1904–1908 term. During that term, Frith served on the following committees: Public Works; Unfinished Business; Pensions; and Joint Committee to Investigate State Officers. He died in his home in Liberty, Mississippi, on December 19, 1912.

== Personal life ==
Frith married Martha Caroline Turnipseed on January 31, 1866. They had six children: William Harris, Susie, John T., Lida, Charles Henry Jr., and George D.
