= Ludlow, Mississippi =

- Unincorporated community
- Location within Mississippi Location within the United States
- Coordinates: 32°34′18″N 89°42′46″W
- Country: United States
- State: Mississippi
- County: Scott
- Elevation: 341 ft (104 m)
- Time zone: UTC-6 (Central (CST))
  - Summer (DST): UTC-5 (CDT)
- ZIP code: 39098
- Area codes: 601 & 769
- GNIS feature ID: 693843

Ludlow is an unincorporated community in Scott County, Mississippi, United States. Ludlow is located on Mississippi Highway 483, 7 miles (11 km) west of Lena. Ludlow has a post office with ZIP code 39098.

== History ==
Ludlow is named for James J. Ludlow, an early settler in the area.

Ludlow is located along the former Gulf, Mobile, and Ohio Railroad and was once home to a doctor, drug store, and general store.

In 1900, Ludlow had a population of 100 and a saw mill, grist mill, and cotton gin.

== Notable people ==
- Hal Lee, a professional baseball player during the 1930s, was born in Ludlow.
- Otho S. Robbins, member of the Mississippi House of Representatives from 1900 to 1908.
