= G. Wood Magee =

American politician (1870–1941)

Member of the Mississippi State Senate from the 8th district
- In office January 5, 1904 – January 7, 1908
- Preceded by: Charles Chrisman
- Succeeded by: F. M. Bush

Personal details
- Born: July 5, 1870 Blountville, Mississippi, U. S.
- Died: April 21, 1941 (aged 70) Monticello, Mississippi, U. S.
- Party: Democratic

George Wood Magee (July 5, 1870 - April 21, 1941) was an American lawyer and politician. He represented the 8th District in the Mississippi State Senate from 1904 to 1908.

== Biography ==
George Wood Magee was born on July 5, 1870, in Blountville, Lincoln County, Mississippi. He was the son of George Washington Magee and Elizabeth (Atwood) Magee. Magee attended Lawrence County's primary schools. He attended Mississippi College between 1888 and 1890, but did not graduate. He then taught at schools in Holmes and Lawrence County for five years. He studied law at his home and was admitted to the bar in January 1896. He started practicing law in Wesson, Mississippi, in 1896. He moved to Monticello, Mississippi, in 1898, and continued practicing law there. In 1903, Magee ran to represent the 8th District (Lincoln and Lawrence Counties) in the Mississippi State Senate as a Democrat for the 1904-1908 term. He won the general election on November 3, 1903. During the term, Magee served on the following committees: Finance; Education; Public Lands; Joint Committee on Executive Contingent Fund; and Library. He died of a heart attack in Monticello, Mississippi, at 11:40 PM on April 21, 1941.

== Personal life ==
Magee was a Baptist. He was a member of the Freemasons, Odd Fellows, and Woodmen of the World. Magee married Julia Augusta Fairman in November 1899. Their children included George Nairne and Lizzie Belle. At the time of his death he was survived by two sons, S. F. and S. C., and four daughters: Mrs. C. L. Fortenberry, Mrs. P. H. Brassfield, Mrs. O. S. Temple, and Ann Magee.
