= J. M. Stephenson =

American politician (1855–1905)

Member of the Mississippi State Senate from the 13th district
- In office January 5, 1904 – April 21, 1905
- Preceded by: John B. Bailey
- Succeeded by: Oliver McIlhenny Jr.

Personal details
- Born: October 10, 1855 Scott County, Mississippi, U. S.
- Died: April 21, 1905 (aged 49) Jackson, Mississippi, U. S.
- Party: Democratic

James Malcolm Stephenson (October 10, 1855 – April 21, 1905) was an American businessman and politician. He represented the 13th District in the Mississippi State Senate from 1904 to 1905.

== Early life ==
James Malcolm Stephenson was born on October 10, 1855, in Scott County, Mississippi. He was the son of Thomas J. Stephenson and Sarah (Jones) Stephenson. Stephenson attended the primary schools of Scott County.

== Career ==
In 1871, Stephenson entered the mercantile business in Morton, Mississippi, as a clerk for C. W. Taylor & Son. Stephenson then formed a partnership with Taylor in 1879, forming Taylor, Stephenson, & Co. In the 1880s Stephenson entered politics. He served as a Marshal, and then Mayor, of Morton. In 1894, Stephenson became sole owner of his mercantile business. In 1895, Stephenson was elected Sheriff of Scott County, and served from 1896 to 1900. In 1903, Stephenson ran to represent the 13th District (Scott and Newton Counties) as a Democrat in the Mississippi State Senate for the 1904–1908 term. He was elected on November 3, 1903. During this term, Stephenson served on the following committees: Finance; Agriculture; Commerce & Manufactures; and Claims. In May 1904, Stephenson was appointed cashier for a new bank in Morton, Mississippi. Stephenson died at his home in Morton on April 21, 1905. Oliver McIlhenny Jr. was elected to replace Stephenson for the 1906 session.

== Personal life ==
Stephenson was a member of the Baptist Church. He was also a member of the Knights of Pythias, Knights of Honor, Knights and Ladies of Honor, and Woodmen of the World. Stephenson married Lilla Belle Marion in November 1878. They had six children, named Albert Malcolm, Carrie, Lillie Marion, James Marion, Laurie Lee, and Mary Francis.
