= T. Webber Wilson =

American politician (1893–1948)

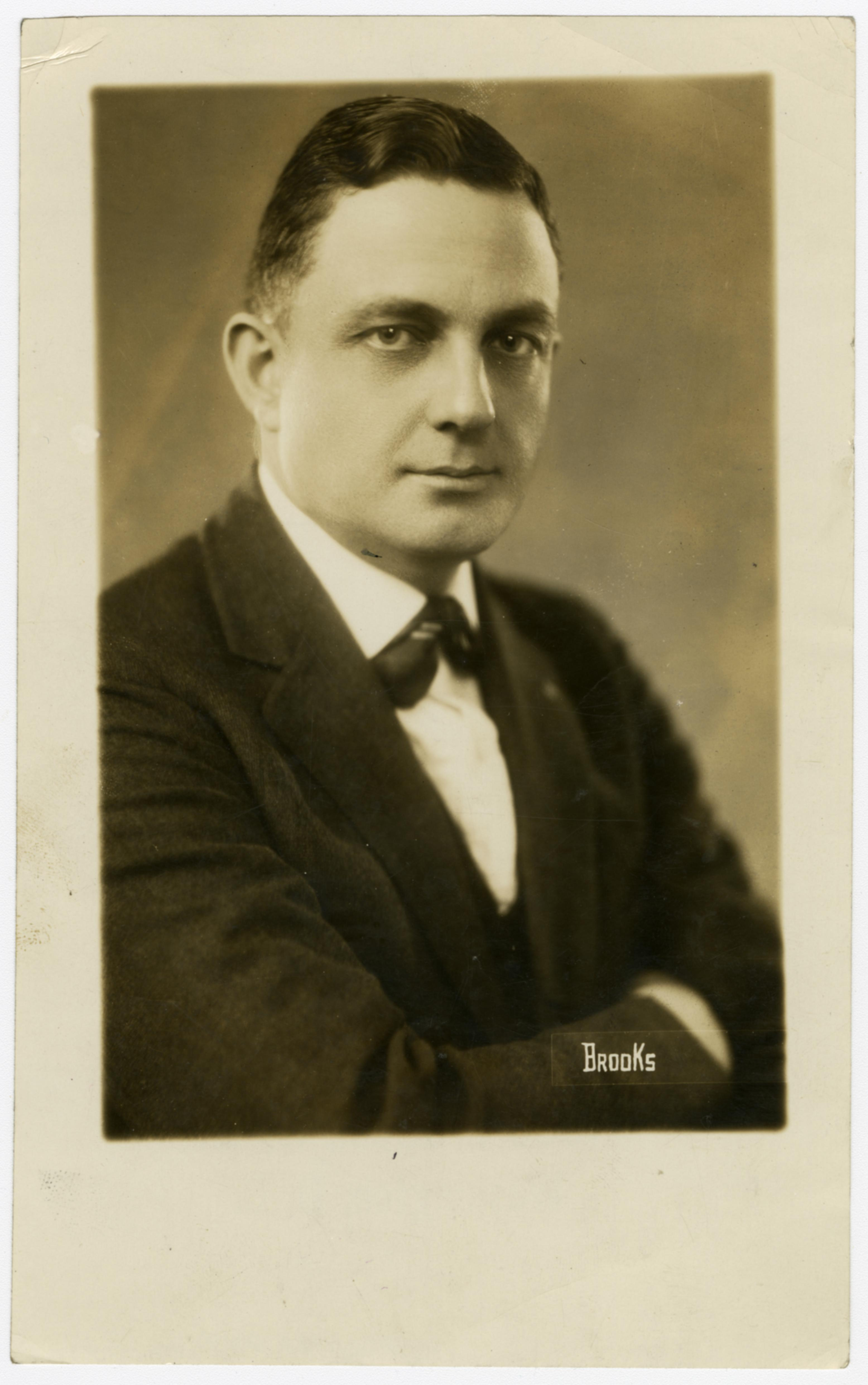

Member of the U.S. House of Representatives from Mississippi's 6th district
- In office March 4, 1923 – March 3, 1929
- Preceded by: Paul B. Johnson Sr.
- Succeeded by: Robert S. Hall

Personal details
- Born: Thomas Webber Wilson; January 24, 1893 Coldwater, Mississippi, U.S.
- Died: January 31, 1948 (aged 55) Coldwater, Mississippi, U.S.
- Resting place: Magnolia Cemetery
- Party: Democratic
- Education: University of Mississippi
- Profession: Politician, lawyer

Thomas Webber Wilson (January 24, 1893 – January 31, 1948) was a U.S. representative from Mississippi.

Born in Coldwater, Mississippi, Wilson attended the public schools of his native city. He was graduated from the law department of the University of Mississippi at Oxford in 1913. He was admitted to the bar the same year and commenced the practice of law in Laurel, Mississippi. He served as prosecuting attorney of Jones County 1915-1919. He served as district attorney for the twelfth judicial district of Mississippi 1919-1923.

Wilson was elected as a Democrat to the Sixty-eighth, Sixty-ninth, and Seventieth Congresses (March 4, 1923 – March 3, 1929). He was not a candidate for renomination in 1928 but was an unsuccessful candidate for the nomination for United States Senator. He engaged in the private practice of law 1928-1933. He was appointed a Federal judge for the Virgin Islands and served from 1933 until 1935. He served as member of the Parole Board in the Justice Department, Washington, D.C. from 1935 to 1947. He died in Coldwater, Mississippi, January 31, 1948. He was interred in Magnolia Cemetery.

U.S. House of Representatives
Preceded by Paul B. Johnson, Sr.	Member of the U.S. House of Representatives from Mississippi's 6th congressional district 1923–1929	Succeeded by Robert S. Hall
