= Mississippi's 6th congressional district =

Former U.S. House district in Mississippi

Coordinates: 31.168809°N 89.289482°W

- Obsolete district
- Created: 1870
- Eliminated: 1960
- Years active: 1873-1963

Mississippi's 6th congressional district existed from 1873 to 1963. It was created after the United States 1870 census and abolished following the 1960 census, due to changes in population.

== Boundaries ==
The 6th congressional district boundaries included all of Covington, Forrest, George, Greene, Hancock, Harrison, Jackson, Jefferson Davis, Lamar, Lawrence, Marion, Pearl River, Perry, Simpson and Wayne County. It also included the eastern portion of modern Walthall County (included as part of Marion County at that time) and all of modern Stone County (included as part of Harrison County at that time).

== List of members representing the district ==
Member	Party	Years	Cong ress	Electoral history
District created March 4, 1873
John R. Lynch (Natchez)	Republican	March 4, 1873 – March 3, 1877	43rd 44th	Elected in 1872. Re-elected in 1874. Lost re-election.
James Ronald Chalmers (Vicksburg)	Democratic	March 4, 1877 – April 29, 1882	45th 46th 47th	Elected in 1876. Re-elected in 1878. Re-elected in 1880. Lost contested election.
John R. Lynch (Natchez)	Republican	April 29, 1882 – March 3, 1883	47th	Won contested election. Lost re-election.
Henry Smith Van Eaton (Woodville)	Democratic	March 4, 1883 – March 3, 1887	48th 49th	Elected in 1882. Re-elected in 1884. Retired.
T.R. Stockdale (Summit)	Democratic	March 4, 1887 – March 3, 1895	50th 51st 52nd 53rd	Elected in 1886. Re-elected in 1888. Re-elected in 1890. Re-elected in 1892. Lost renomination.
Walter McKennon Denny (Scranton)	Democratic	March 4, 1895 – March 3, 1897	54th	Elected in 1894. Lost renomination.
William F. Love (Gloster)	Democratic	March 4, 1897 – October 16, 1898	55th	Elected in 1896. Died.
Vacant		October 16, 1898 – December 12, 1898	55th	
Frank A. McLain (Gloster)	Democratic	December 12, 1898 – March 3, 1903	55th 56th 57th	Elected to finish Love's term. Also elected to the next full term. Re-elected in 1900. Redistricted to the 7th district.
Eaton J. Bowers (Bay St. Louis)	Democratic	March 4, 1903 – March 3, 1911	58th 59th 60th 61st	Elected in 1902. Re-elected in 1904. Re-elected in 1906. Re-elected in 1908. Retired.
Pat Harrison (Gulfport)	Democratic	March 4, 1911 – March 3, 1919	62nd 63rd 64th 65th	Elected in 1910. Re-elected in 1912. Re-elected in 1914. Re-elected in 1916. Retired to run for U.S. senator.
Paul B. Johnson Sr. (Hattiesburg)	Democratic	March 4, 1919 – March 3, 1923	66th 67th	Elected in 1918. Re-elected in 1920. Retired.
T. Webber Wilson (Laurel)	Democratic	March 4, 1923 – March 3, 1929	68th 69th 70th	Elected in 1922. Re-elected in 1924. Re-elected in 1926. Retired to run for U.S. senator.
Robert S. Hall (Hattiesburg)	Democratic	March 4, 1929 – March 3, 1933	71st 72nd	Elected in 1928. Re-elected in 1930. Lost renomination.
William M. Colmer (Pascagoula)	Democratic	March 4, 1933 – January 3, 1963	73rd 74th 75th 76th 77th 78th 79th 80th 81st 82nd 83rd 84th 85th 86th 87th	Elected in 1932. Re-elected in 1934. Re-elected in 1936. Re-elected in 1938. Re-elected in 1940. Re-elected in 1942. Re-elected in 1944. Re-elected in 1946. Re-elected in 1948. Re-elected in 1950. Re-elected in 1952. Re-elected in 1954. Re-elected in 1956. Re-elected in 1958. Re-elected in 1960. Redistricted to the 5th district.
District eliminated January 3, 1963
