= H. H. Elmore =

American politician

Member of the Mississippi State Senate from the 21st district
- In office January 5, 1904 – January 7, 1908
- Preceded by: Edmond F. Noel
- Succeeded by: S. N. Sample

Personal details
- Born: August 26, 1875 Graves County, Kentucky, U. S.
- Died: June 2, 1934 (aged 58) Cleveland, Mississippi, U. S.
- Party: Democratic

Henry Hubbard Elmore (August 26, 1875 – June 2, 1934) was an American politician. He represented the 21st District in the Mississippi State Senate from 1904 to 1908.

== Early life ==
Henry Hubbard Elmore was born on August 26, 1875, in Graves County, Kentucky. He was the son of Providence Elmore, who later became mayor of Acona, and Martha (McGee) Elmore. His siblings included a brother, R. C., and two sisters. Elmore attended Acona's primary schools. He then attended Mississippi Agricultural & Mechanical College, graduating with a B. A. degree. Elmore then attended Vanderbilt University, graduating with a B. L. degree.

== Career ==
On January 1, 1900, Elmore moved to Lexington, Mississippi, to practice law. Elmore then ran to represent the 21st District (Holmes County) in the Mississippi State Senate for the 1904–1908 term. During this term, he served on the following committees: Judiciary; Local & Private Legislation; Registration & Elections; Joint Committee Library; and Investigating State Officers.

After his Senate term ended, Elmore became a Judge of the 4th Judicial District. He later resigned. Elmore died at his home in Cleveland on June 2, 1934.

== Personal life ==
Elmore was a member of the Knights of Pythias. He married and his widow survived him.
