= William M. Colmer =

American politician (1890–1980)

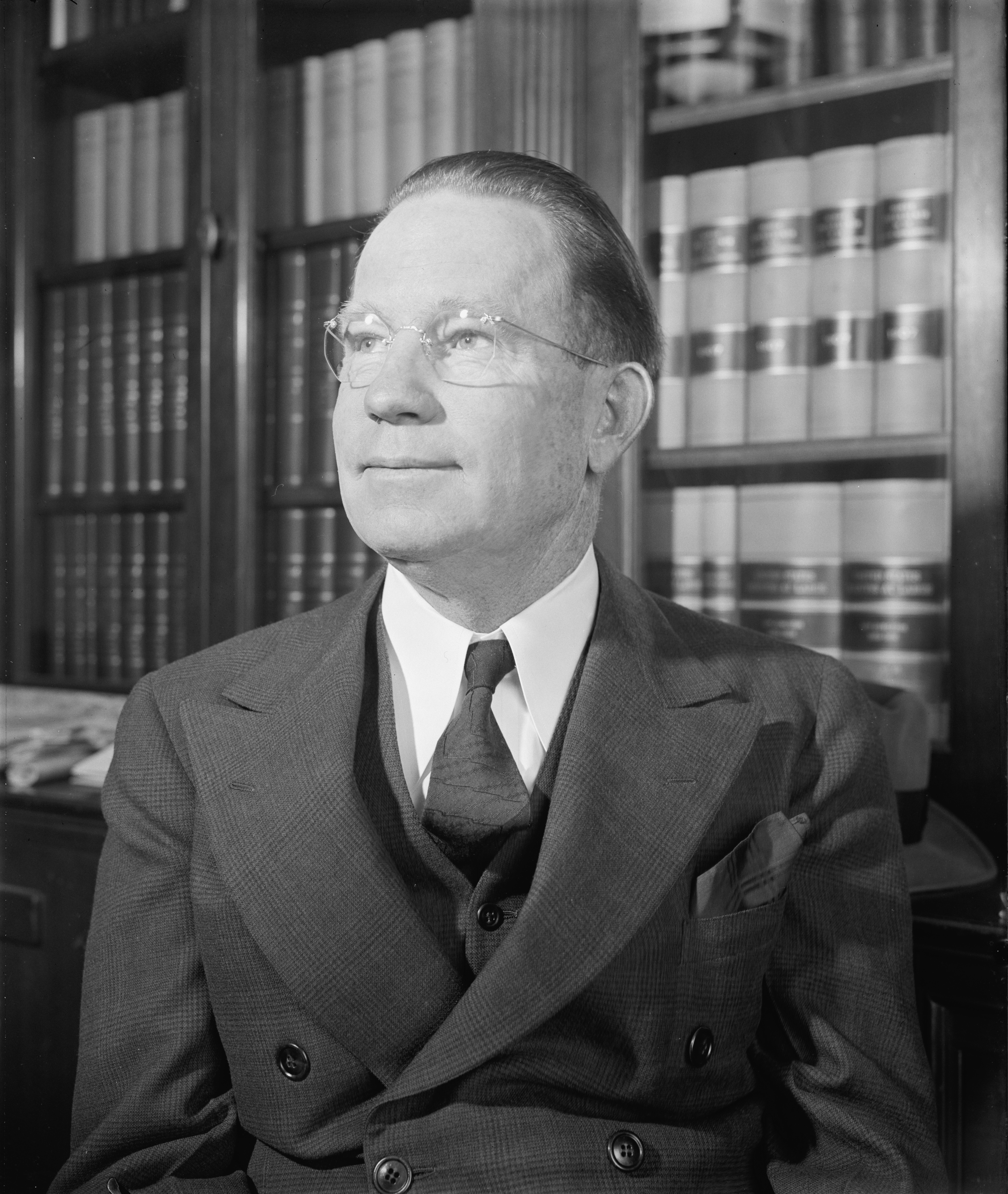
- Colmer in 1940

Chair of the House Rules Committee
- In office January 3, 1967 – January 3, 1973
- Speaker: John W. McCormack; Carl Albert
- Preceded by: Howard W. Smith
- Succeeded by: Ray Madden

Member of the U.S. House of Representatives from Mississippi
- In office March 4, 1933 – January 3, 1973
- Preceded by: Robert S. Hall
- Succeeded by: Trent Lott
- Constituency: 6th district (1933–1963); 5th district (1963–1973)

Personal details
- Born: William Meyers Colmer; February 11, 1890 Moss Point, Mississippi, U.S.
- Died: September 9, 1980 (aged 90) Pascagoula, Mississippi, U.S.
- Party: Democratic
- Education: Millsaps College

William Meyers Colmer (February 11, 1890 – September 9, 1980) was an American politician from Mississippi.

Colmer was born in Moss Point, Mississippi, and attended Millsaps College. He served in the military during World War I.

Colmer was elected Jackson County attorney in 1921, becoming district attorney in 1928.

In 1932, Colmer was elected to the House of Representatives as a Democrat from Mississippi's 6th District, located on the Gulf Coast. He was reelected 19 times. His district was renumbered the 5th after the 1960 Census, when Mississippi's declining proportion of the US population due to the Great Migration cost it a congressional seat.

Originally elected as a supporter of President Franklin D. Roosevelt's New Deal, Colmer became increasingly conservative as the years passed. He became disenchanted as the national Democratic Party began to support the Civil Rights Movement, and chose to back the Dixiecrats in 1948. After the Brown v. Board of Education (1954) decision by the United States Supreme Court, ruling that public school segregation was unconstitutional, Colmer helped to get Southern Democratic congressmen to sign the "Southern Manifesto" declaring their resistance. Colmer voted against the Civil Rights Acts of 1957, the Civil Rights Acts of 1960, the Civil Rights Acts of 1964, and the Civil Rights Acts of 1968 as well as the 24th Amendment to the U.S. Constitution and the Voting Rights Act of 1965.

Colmer endorsed the unpledged electors slate in 1960, Republican Party presidential candidates Barry Goldwater in 1964, and Richard Nixon in 1972. Because of his seniority, he advanced to the position as chairman of the Rules Committee, serving from 1967 to 1973.

Colmer did not run for reelection in 1972. He endorsed his administrative assistant, Trent Lott, as his successor, although Lott ran as a Republican. Colmer served longer in the U.S. House of Representatives than anyone in Mississippi's history except Jamie Whitten, who served 54 years in Congress from 1941 to 1995. (Fellow Mississippian John Stennis would serve over 41 years in the U.S. Senate from late 1947 until early 1989.)

== Note ==
- Colmer Middle School in Pascagoula, Mississippi is named after William Colmer.

== See also ==
- Southern Democrats
- Conservative Democrat

U.S. House of Representatives
Preceded by Robert S. Hall	Member of the U.S. House of Representatives from Mississippi's 6th congressional district 1933–1963	District eliminated after Census 1960
Preceded by W. Arthur Winstead	Member of the U.S. House of Representatives from Mississippi's 5th congressional district 1963–1973	Succeeded by Trent Lott
