= John Hebron =

American politician from Mississippi

John L. Hebron Sr. was a 19th-century American surgeon, planter, and state legislator in Mississippi.

Hebron Sr. was born in Virginia and raised in Mississippi. His father, also named John Hebron (1802–1862), purchased an 880-acre plantation near Vicksburg, Mississippi, and grew fruit using slave labor. Our subject attended the New Orleans Medical College from 1856 to 1858, and maintained a surgical practice until 1876, which included service during the American Civil War. He was elected to a single term on the Mississippi Senate in 1876, representing Warren County, Mississippi. Hebron subsequently retired from electoral politics and leased the state penitentiary for two years before selling the lease to Jones S. Hamilton. Between 1880 and 1887, Hebron was a planter, then reestablished his medical practice.

Hebron married in 1860, and had a son, John L. Hebron Jr., who attended the University of Mississippi, and also served on the Mississippi Senate. During his term, Hebron Jr. spoke at the dedication of a memorial to Confederate soldiers.
