= C. C. Dunn =

Former American politician

Member of the Mississippi State Senate from the 14th district
- In office January 1920 – January 1924
- Preceded by: Richard E. Thompson
- In office January 2, 1900 – January 7, 1908
- Preceded by: W. H. Hardy
- Succeeded by: John A. Bailey

Personal details
- Born: April 19, 1871 Amite County, Mississippi, U. S.
- Died: December 28, 1934 (aged 63) Meridian, Mississippi, U. S.
- Party: Democratic

Chris Carroll Dunn (April 19, 1871 - December 28, 1934) was an American politician and lawyer. He represented the 14th District in the Mississippi State Senate from 1900 to 1908 and from 1920 to 1924.

== Early life ==
Chris Carroll Dunn was born on April 19, 1871, in Carroll County, Mississippi. He was the son of Charles M. Dunn, a Confederate Army soldier, and Calula (Bates) Dunn. He had four sisters. Dunn attended Amite County's primary schools. He then studied law and was admitted to the bar in 1892.

== Career ==
Dunn moved to Meridian, Mississippi, to start his law practice, in 1892. In 1899, Dunn was elected to represent the 14th District (Lauderdale County) as a Democrat in the Mississippi State Senate for the 1900–1904 term. During that term, Dunn served on the following committees: Judiciary; Public Works; Registration & Elections; and Corporations. Dunn was re-elected on November 3, 1903, for the 1904-1908 term. During this term, Dunn served on the following committees: Rules; Judiciary; Constitution; Humane & Benevolent Institutions; and Insurance. In 1908, Dunn served as Mississippi's Vice President of the American Bar Association. In 1914, Dunn became the County Attorney of Meridian County. By 1918, Dunn was a member of the Amis & Dunn law firm alongside Alfonzo B. Amis. He later served as attorney for the county supervisors as well as acting city attorney of Meridian. In 1919, Dunn was re-elected to the State Senate for the 1920-1924 term. During this term, Dunn chaired the Engrossed Bills committee. He also served on the following committees: Rules; Judiciary; Immigration; Insurance; Drainage; Roads, Ferries, and Bridges; and Oyster Industry.

== Personal life and death ==
Dunn was a Baptist. He was a member of the Freemasons, Knights of Pythias, and Knights and Ladies of Honor. He married Lulie Alma Gressett on February 27, 1894. Lulie died in 1920. Dunn remarried, to Lucille Schilling, on December 6, 1921. Dunn died in a hunting accident on December 28, 1934. He was survived by his widow, mother, and four sisters.
