= Clement L. V. Ratcliff =

American politician

Member of the Mississippi State Senate from the 6th district
- In office January 5, 1904 – January 7, 1908
- Preceded by: J. H. McGehee
- Succeeded by: M. C. McGehee

Personal details
- Born: August 9, 1871 Gloster, Mississippi, U. S.
- Died: May 15, 1960 (aged 88) Shreveport, Louisiana, U. S.
- Party: Democratic

Clement Lamartine Vanlandingham Ratcliff (August 9, 1871 - May 15, 1960) was an American politician. He represented the 6th District in the Mississippi State Senate from 1904 to 1908.

== Biography ==
Clement Lamartine Vanlandingham Ratcliff was born on August 9, 1871, in Gloster, Mississippi. He was the son of Holloway Huff Ratcliff and Francis (Jenkins) Ratcliff. Ratcliff attended Amite County's public schools. He entered the University of Mississippi in 1890. Ratcliff worked as the official court stenographer of Mississippi's 3rd Circuit Court District from 1894 to 1898. Ratcliff began practicing law in 1898 in Summit, Mississippi. He served as the mayor of Summit from 1900 to 1902. He also served on the Democratic Executive Committee of Pike County. Ratcliff then ran to represent the 6th District (Pike and Franklin Counties) as a Democrat in the Mississippi State Senate for the 1904-1908 term. He won the Democratic nomination on August 6, 1903. Ratcliff then won the general election on November 3, 1903. During his term, Ratcliff served on the following committees: Finance; Railroads & Franchises; Registration & Elections; Public Lands; and Joint Committee on Enrolled Bills. Ratcliff moved to Shreveport, Louisiana, on January 19, 1913. In Shreveport Ratcliff became active in both law and real estate. In the late 1950s he opened up several new real estate subdivisions in Shreveport. He also served as director of historical research for the Louisiana State Museum. He died after a one-week illness on May 15, 1960, in Shreveport.

== Personal life ==
Ratcliff was a Baptist. He was also a member of the Freemasons, Odd Fellows, Elks, Woodmen of the World, and Chi Psi. Ratcliff married Mary Emma Teunison on March 31, 1896, in Summit, Mississippi. They had two children, Annie May and Grace Irving. He had six grandsons. Emma died on November 13, 1959, after 63 years of marriage.
