= Emmet Thomas =

American politician

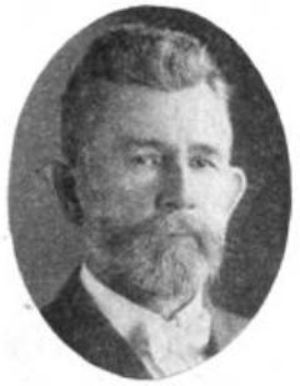
- 1904

Speaker of the Mississippi House of Representatives
- In office January 5, 1904 – January 1908
- Preceded by: A. J. Russell
- Succeeded by: Hugh M. Street

Member of the Mississippi House of Representatives from the Washington County district
- In office January 1890 – January 1908
- Preceded by: R. B. Campbell; John T. Casey; W. H. Harris

Personal details
- Born: Emmet Nicholson Thomas; June 10, 1855 Gonzales, Texas
- Died: September 15, 1932 (aged 77)
- Party: Democratic
- Spouse: Martha H. Shackleford (m. 1884)
- Children: 3

Emmet Nicholson Thomas (June 10, 1855 - September 15, 1932) was an American politician. He was the speaker of the Mississippi House of Representatives from 1904 to 1908.

== Early life and career ==
Emmet Nicholson Thomas was born on June 10, 1855, in Gonzales, Texas. He was the son of William Thomas, a probate judge in Texas during the Civil War, and his wife Ann (Rogers) Thomas; both of whom were of Scottish descent. Thomas attended public schools, and he graduated from Mississippi College with a B. A. degree in 1876. Thomas then read law and was admitted to the bar in 1880. He then began practicing law in Washington County, Mississippi.

== Political career ==
Thomas was elected to represent Washington County as a Democrat in the Mississippi House of Representatives in 1889. He was re-elected in 1895, 1899, and 1903. On June 3, 1903, he officiated at the laying of the cornerstone of Mississippi's new State Capitol. On January 5, 1904, Thomas was elected by the other representatives to be the office of the Speaker of the House.

== Later life ==
Thomas died on September 15, 1932.

== Personal life ==
Thomas was a Presbyterian. He was a Grand Master of the Masonic Grand Lodge of Mississippi. In 1884, he married Martha H. Shackleford; they had three children together.
