= G. Edward Williams =

American politician (1885–1940)

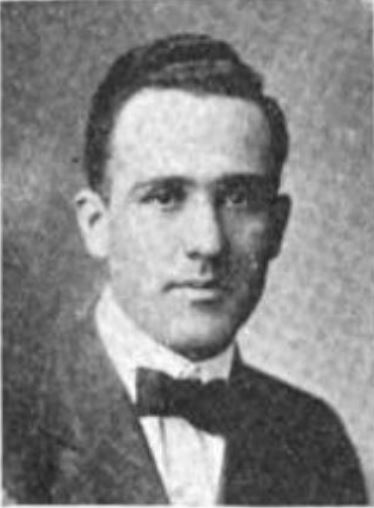
- c. 1917

Member of the Mississippi Senate from the 12th district
- In office January 1916 – January 1918

Personal details
- Born: 1885
- Died: August 17, 1940 (aged 54–55) Clarksdale, Mississippi, U.S.
- Party: Democratic

G. Edward Williams (1885 – August 17, 1940) was an American lawyer and Democratic politician.

== Biography ==
G. Edward Williams was born in 1885. He received a B. S. degree from Mississippi College in 1905. In 1915, Williams was elected to represent the 12th District in the Mississippi State Senate, as the Hinds and Warren Counties floater representative. He was a resident of Jackson, Mississippi, at the time. After his district was redistricted in the middle of the term, George Anderson of Vicksburg was elected, but Williams contested his seat due to being "legislated out of office". Williams moved to Clarksdale, Mississippi, in 1920, where he served as a chancery judge for several years. On August 17, 1940, Williams was driving his car, when it was struck by another car; he died of a cerebral hemorrhage at the Dr. I. W. Barrett Clinic in Clarksdale 30 minutes later.
