= Lewis A. Moss =

American politician

Member of the Mississippi House of Representatives from the Hinds County district
- In office January 2, 1900 – January 5, 1904 Serving with J. A. P. Campbell Jr. Henry Clay Sharkey

Personal details
- Born: March 8, 1840 New York, New York, U. S.
- Died: January 1, 1905 (aged 64) New Orleans, Louisiana, U. S.
- Party: Democratic

Lewis A. Moss (March 8, 1840 - January 1, 1905) was an American merchant and politician. He represented Hinds County as a Democrat in the Mississippi House of Representatives from 1900 to 1904.

== Biography ==
Lewis A. Moss was born on March 8, 1840, in New York City. He was the thirteenth and youngest child of merchant Benjamin A. Moss (died 1849) and Alice (Davis) Moss, who emigrated from England to the US in 1832. Lewis attended the public schools until age 12. Then, he moved to California, where he stayed and worked until 1855. He then returned to New York and started "an auction business", which he continued after moving to Georgia in 1857. In 1861, he joined Company E of the 4th Georgia Infantry in the American Civil War. He fought in the Seven Days Battles. He surrendered with General Joseph Johnston. After the war, he moved to Vicksburg, Mississippi, where he opened a store. In 1875, he moved to Edwards, Mississippi, and continued running a store there. By 1891, the store was worth $100,000 in annual revenue. Moss also owned 1600 acres of land by 1891, which he used to cultivate cotton and corn. Moss died in New Orleans, Louisiana, on January 1, 1905.

== Political career ==
Moss, a Democrat, served as alderman of Edwards for 14 years before 1891. He also served as its mayor. In 1899, Moss was elected to represent Hinds County in the Mississippi House of Representatives for the 1900–1904 term.

== Personal life ==
Moss was Jewish. Moss married the French-born Fannie Weil on April 14, 1871. Their children included Carrie, Benjamin, and Jacques, and six others who died in infancy. He was a member of the following groups: Freemasons, Knights of Pythias, Knights of Honor, American Legion of Honor, Free Sons of Israel, and B'nai B'rith.
