= W. H. Harris =

American politician

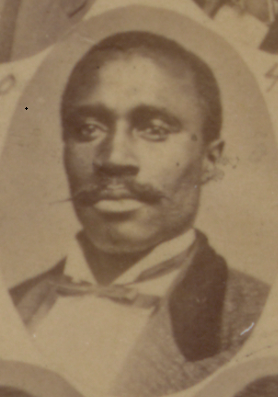

W. H. Harris was a farmer and state legislator in Mississippi. He represented Washington County, Mississippi in the Mississippi House of Representatives from 1874 to 1875 and from 1888 to 1889.

In 1883, he was reportedly aligned with the Democrats. In 1887, he was reported to be the Democrats’ selection for one of three Washington County seats in the Mississippi House of Representatives set aside for an African American per longstanding agreement. He was described as being a Republican and one of only 10 Republicans in the House during the session, five white and five African American.

== See also ==
- African American officeholders from the end of the Civil War until before 1900
