= Oliver McIlhenny =

American politician (1861–1928)

Member of the Mississippi State Senate from the 13th district
- In office January 2, 1906 – January 7, 1908
- Preceded by: J. M. Stephenson
- Succeeded by: G. H. Banks

Member of the Mississippi House of Representatives from the Scott County district
- In office January 7, 1908 – January 1912
- Preceded by: A. N. Cooper

Personal details
- Born: August 13, 1861 Wilmington, North Carolina, U. S.
- Died: June 20, 1928 (aged 66)
- Party: Democratic

Oliver McIlhenny Jr. (August 13, 1861 – June 20, 1928) was an American politician. Representing Scott County, Mississippi, he served in the Mississippi State Senate in 1906, and in the Mississippi House of Representatives from 1908 to 1912.

== Early life ==
Oliver McIlhenny Jr. was born on August 13, 1861, in Wilmington, North Carolina. He was the son of Oliver McIlhenny, who was born in County Donegal, Ireland, and Olivia (Smith) McIlhenny, who was of Irish descent. McIlhenny received his early education in schools in Tuskegee, Alabama. He then attended the University of Georgia. McIlhenny then attended the Cumberland School of Law, graduating in 1890.

== Career ==
McIlhenny served as the Mayor of Forest, Mississippi, from 1903 to 1904. He then was an elector in the 1904 Presidential Election. In 1905, McIlhenny was elected to replace the deceased J. M. Stephenson, representing the 13th District (Scott and Newton Counties) in the Mississippi State Senate for the remainder of the 1904–1908 term. During the 1906 session, McIlhenny was a member of the following committees: Finance; Revision of Code of 1906; Agriculture; and Commerce & Immigration. On November 5, 1907, McIlhenny was elected to represent Scott County as a Democrat in the Mississippi House of Representatives for the 1908–1912 term. During this term, McIlhenny chaired the Penitentiary committee, and served on the Judiciary and Ways & Means committees. He was then re-elected mayor of Forest, and served from 1912 to 1918. In June 1914, McIlhenny announced his candidacy for Chancellor of Mississippi's 2nd District. McIlhenny died at 2 o'clock on June 20, 1928. He was buried in Forest.

== Personal life ==
McIlhenny was a Presbyterian. He was active in the Freemasons, and was a High Priest of the Royal Accepted Masons and a Senior Warden of his lodge, Robert W. Payne No. 97 in Forest. He never married.
