= John R. Dinsmore =

Former American politician

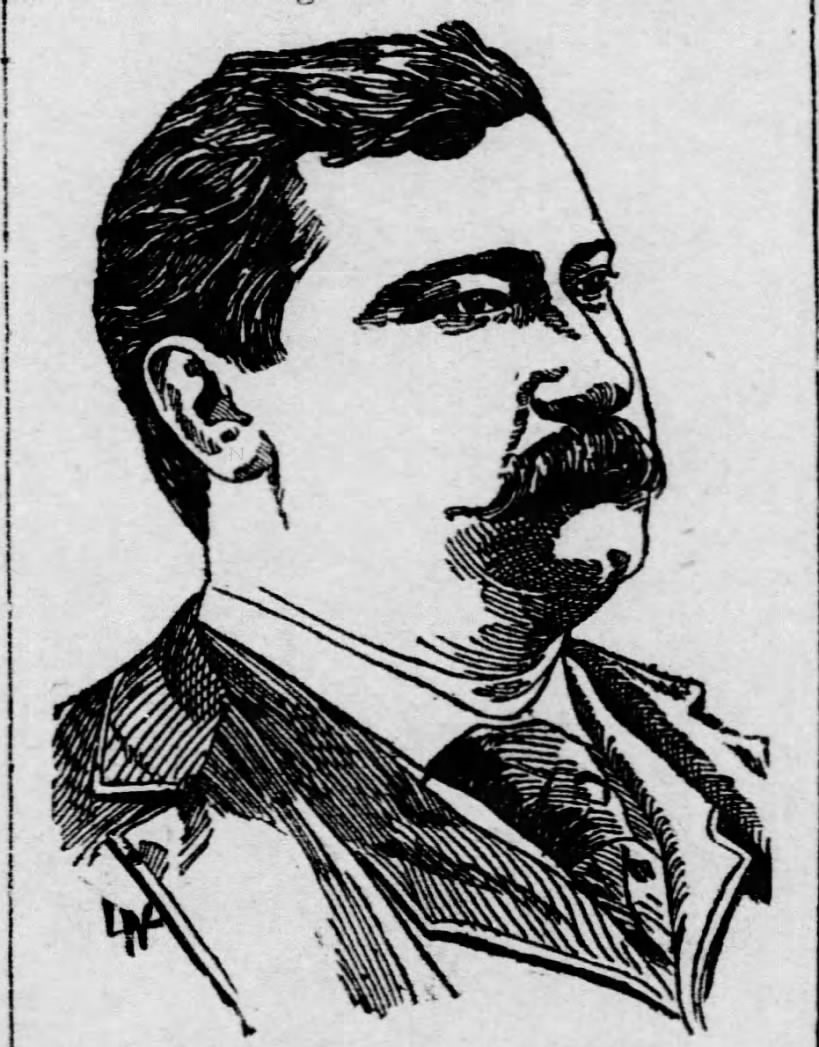
- c. 1894

President pro tempore of the Mississippi State Senate
- In office January 2, 1900 – April 27, 1900
- Preceded by: James T. Harrison
- Succeeded by: William Gwin Kiger

Member of the Mississippi State Senate from the 16th district
- In office January 2, 1900 – April 27, 1900
- Preceded by: Walter Price
- Succeeded by: A. T. Dent

Member of the Mississippi House of Representatives from the Noxubee County district
- In office January 5, 1892 – January 2, 1900

Personal details
- Born: January 18, 1855 Noxubee County, Mississippi, U.S.
- Died: April 27, 1900 (aged 45) Macon, Mississippi, U.S.
- Party: Democratic

John Robert Dinsmore Sr. (January 18, 1855 - April 27, 1900) was an American lawyer and Democratic politician from Macon, Mississippi. He was the President pro tempore of the Mississippi State Senate in 1900 and also served in the Mississippi House of Representatives from 1892 to 1900.

== Biography ==
John Robert DInsmore was born near Macon, Mississippi, on January 18, 1855. He was the son of Andrew McDonald Dinsmore and Minerva Barton (Beauchamp) Dinsmore. Andrew Dinsmore was of Scotch-Irish descent. John Dinsmore studied law at Cumberland University, graduating in June 1876, "completing his law course with honor and winning a medal for debating". Dinsmore then became a lawyer in Macon, Mississippi.

== Career ==
Dinsmore was elected to be Mayor of Macon in 1880 and then served for six years in a row. On November 3, 1891, Dinsmore was elected to represent Noxubee County as a Democrat in the Mississippi House of Representatives for the 1892-1896 term. Dinsmore served in both sessions of the term, held in 1892 and 1894. In the 1894 session, Dinsmore served in the House's Appropriations and Manufacturers committees. In 1895, Dinsmore ran for re-election, and mentioned his support of free silver in his bid for re-election. On November 7, 1895, Dinsmore was elected to another four-year term (the 1896–1900 term) in the House. He served in all three of that term's sessions, held in 1896, 1897, and 1898.

In 1899, Dinsmore was elected to represent the 16th District in the Mississippi State Senate for the 1900–1904 term. He was unanimously elected to be the senate's president pro tempore for the four years of that term.

While still in office, Dinsmore died of apoplexy at his home in Macon, Mississippi, on April 27, 1900. He was considered a leading figure in the Mississippi bar at the time of his death. In the 1902 session, he was succeeded in the 16th District by A. T. Dent, and as president pro tempore by William Gwin Kiger.

== Personal life ==
Dinsmore was a deacon in the Presbyterian Church. Dinsmore married Quintilla Dent on December 15, 1884. They had two daughters, Mary W., who married Franklin Price Ivy; and Alma Earle, who married William Henry Rose on November 1, 1916. They also had a son, John Robert Jr. (born July 4, 1892), who married Mary Chastellette Avery on September 22, 1917, and served as a Captain in the U.S. Infantry during World War I and was elected to the Mississippi House himself in 1919 for the 1920–1924 term.
