= W. R. Scott (politician) =

American politician

Member of the Mississippi State Senate from the 24th district
- In office January 1928 – May 15, 1928
- Succeeded by: Luther Latham
- In office January 5, 1904 – January 7, 1908
- Preceded by: J. Walter Heard
- Succeeded by: F. G. Barry

Personal details
- Born: August 29, 1868 Vaiden, Mississippi
- Party: Democratic

William Robert Scott (born August 29, 1868) was an American politician. He represented the 24th District in the Mississippi State Senate from 1904 to 1908 and in 1928. He also served as Railroad Commissioner from 1908 to 1912 and from 1928 to 1932.

== Early life ==
William Robert Scott was born near Vaiden, Mississippi, on August 29, 1868. He was the son of Andrew J. Scott and Sallie (Teat) Scott. Scott attended Calhoun County's primary schools.

== Career ==
Scott served as editor of the Eupora Progress from 1890 to 1896. In 1892, Scott was elected mayor of Eupora. Scott resigned in 1897, and entered the drug business. In 1903, Scott was elected to represent the 24th District (Clay and Webster Counties) in the Mississippi State Senate as a Democrat for the 1904-1908 term. During this term, Scott served on the following committees: Public Works; Printing; Penitentiary & Prisons; Insurance; and the Joint Committee on Enrolled Bills.

Scott was elected Railroad Commissioner for the State's 3rd District on November 5, 1907, for the 1908–1912 term. He ran for re-election in 1911. Scott lost the Democratic renomination for the third district to W. B. Wilson; on the Second Primary on August 22, 1911, Scott received 20,750 votes, while Wilson received 29,130 votes.

In August 1927, Scott was renominated represent the 24th Senate district for the 1928–1932 term. On May 15, 1928, Governor Theodore Bilbo appointed Scott Railroad Commissioner for the northern district to succeed W. F. Lagrone. Luther Latham replaced Scott in the Senate. Scott ran for re-election for Railroad Commissioner in 1931. He lost the 3rd District nomination to Dillard Brown.

== Personal life ==
Scott was a member of the Baptist Church. He was unmarried as of 1908.
