= Williamsburg, Mississippi =

- Unincorporated community
- Location within Mississippi Location within the United States
- Coordinates: 31°37′10″N 89°36′38″W
- Country: United States
- State: Mississippi
- County: Covington
- Elevation: 341 ft (104 m)
- Time zone: UTC-6 (Central (CST))
  - Summer (DST): UTC-5 (CDT)
- Area codes: 601 & 769
- GNIS feature ID: 679722

Williamsburg, (also spelled as Williamsburgh), is an Unincorporated community in Covington County, Mississippi, United States. Williamsburg served as the county seat from 1829 until 1906. Three separate courthouses were built and subsequently burned in Williamsburg. The last courthouse was burned by an arsonist. Train service was brought to an area nearby named Williamsburg Depot, which was renamed Collins. Williamsburg lost its status as a county seat and was replaced by Collins.

A post office operated under the name Williamsburgh from 1827 to 1891 and under the name Williamsburg from 1891 to 1907.

A book about the community and its graveyards was published in 2013.

== Notable native ==
- Robert S. Hall, U.S. Representative from Mississippi from 1929 to 1933
