= Frederick Albert Clinton =

African-American politician (1834 – 1890)

South Carolina Senate
- In office 1868–1877

Personal details
- Born: March 1, 1834 Lancaster County, South Carolina
- Died: September 21, 1890 (aged 56)
- Resting place: Mt. Carmel A.M.E. Zion Church Cemetery
- Party: Republican

Military service
- Branch/service: National Guard
- Rank: colonel
- Unit: Sixth Regiment

Frederick Albert Clinton (March 1, 1834 - September 21, 1890) was a delegate to the 1868 South Carolina Constitutional Convention, state legislator, trial justice, and militia officer. He represented Lancaster County, South Carolina in the South Carolina Senate from 1868 to 1877. He was a Republican.

Before the American Civil War he was enslaved by Ervin (or Irvin) Clinton, a lawyer. In November 1870, P. B. Tompkins contested his election.

Isom Caleb Clinton, his older brother, was a bishop who assisted in founding the Mount Carmel A.M.E. Zion Church in Lancaster County. The Lancaster Ledger ran an obituary for him. Frederick Albert Clinton is buried in the graveyard on the church and campground's north side.

== See also ==
- African American officeholders from the end of the Civil War until before 1900
