= Ofahoma, Mississippi =

- Unincorporated community
- Location within Mississippi Location within the United States
- Coordinates: 32°42′26″N 89°42′02″W
- Country: United States
- State: Mississippi
- County: Leake
- Elevation: 341 ft (104 m)
- Time zone: UTC-6 (Central (CST))
  - Summer (DST): UTC-5 (CDT)
- Area codes: 601 & 769
- GNIS feature ID: 692122

Ofahoma is an unincorporated community in Leake County, Mississippi, United States. Ofahoma is located along Mississippi Highway 16 9.75 miles (15.69 km) west of Carthage.

== History ==
Ofahoma is a name derived from the Choctaw language meaning "Red Dog"; this name most likely was applied to a local Choctaw warrior.

The community is located on the Yockanookany River and in 1900 had a population of 106.

A post office operated under the name Ofahoma from 1866 to 1982.
