= James A. Clinton =

American politician

Member of the Mississippi State Senate from the 9th district
- In office January 7, 1896 – January 2, 1906
- Preceded by: Will T. Martin
- Succeeded by: Gerard Brandon

Personal details
- Born: September 18, 1864 Tensas Parish, Louisiana, U. S.
- Died: August 16, 1907 (aged 42) Natchez, Mississippi, U. S.
- Party: Democratic

James Andrews Clinton (September 18, 1864 - August 16, 1907) was an American lawyer and politician. He represented the 9th District in the Mississippi State Senate between 1896 and 1906.

== Early life ==
James Andrews Clinton was born on September 18, 1864, near St. Joseph, Louisiana. He was the son of Thomas Pipkin Clinton (1836–1898), a former district attorney, and Elizabeth (Andrews) Clinton. His paternal grandfather, Rev. Thomas Clinton, came to Mississippi in 1823 and was a nephew of DeWitt Clinton. James's paternal grandmother, Annie (Hannah) Clinton, was a daughter of Henry Hannah, a member of the Mississippi Legislature on the First Constitutional Convention.

James attended primary schools in New Orleans. He attended Louisiana State University between January 1, 1879 and July 5, 1880. He then entered Vanderbilt University in September 1880. He was there until May 1884. He then received a B. L. degree from there on June 16, 1886. On September 18, 1886, Clinton started practicing law in Natchez, Mississippi.

== Career ==
Clinton worked as an attorney for several railroad companies. In November 1895, Clinton was elected to represent the 9th District (Adams County) as a Democrat in the Mississippi State Senate for the 1896-1900 term. During this term, Clinton chaired the Committee on Engrossed Bills. In 1899, Clinton was re-elected to the Senate for the 1900-1904 term. During that term, Clinton served on the following committees: Rules; Judiciary; Constitution; Military; and Unfinished Business. He was re-elected in 1903 for the 1904-1908 term. During this term, Clinton served on the following committees: Rules; Judiciary; Penitentiary and Prisons; Corporations; and Public Health & Quarantine. Clinton resigned before the Senate's 1906 session. Clinton died on August 16, 1907, in Natchez.

== Personal life ==
Clinton was a Presbyterian. He was a member of the Freemasons, Knights Templar, Odd Fellows, and the Elks. He married Milbury Dickinson Winston on November 24, 1891, in Natchez. They had one son, James Andrews Clinton Jr.
