= Richard Abbay =

American politician (1838–1919)

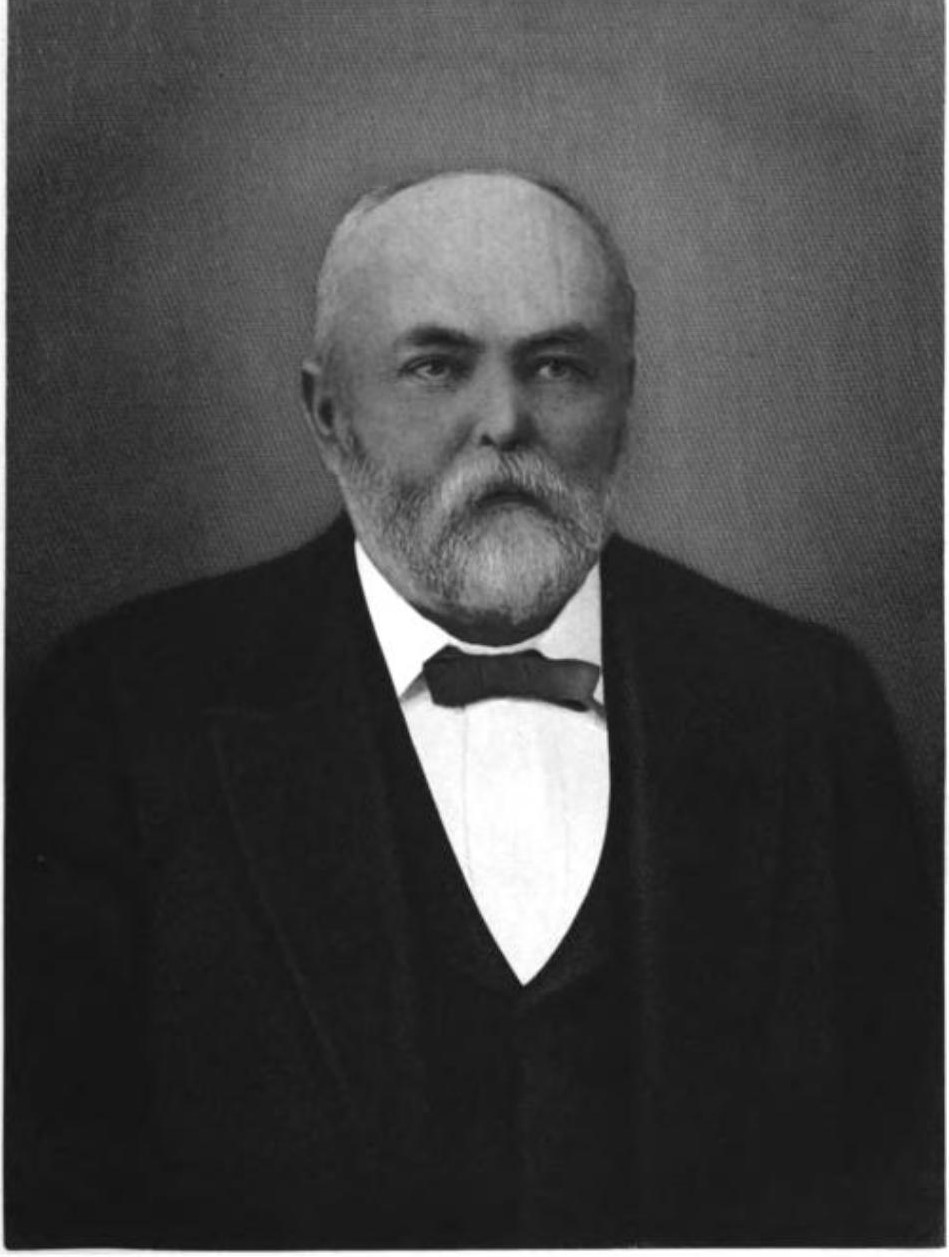

Member of the Mississippi Senate from the 34th district
- In office January 1900 – January 1904

Member of the Mississippi House of Representatives from the Tunica County district
- In office January 1896 – January 1900
- In office January 1888 – January 1892

Personal details
- Born: June 9, 1838 Davidson County, Tennessee
- Died: June 5, 1919 (aged 80) Commerce, Mississippi
- Party: Democrat

Richard Felix Abbay (June 9, 1838 - June 5, 1919) was an American politician and planter and a Democratic Mississippi state legislator in the late 19th and early 20th centuries.

== Biography ==
Richard Felix Abbay was born in Davidson County, Tennessee, on June 9, 1838. He was the son of Richard, a planter, and Mary (Compton) Abbay. Abbay was raised in Mississippi, and received his early education in Tennessee. He graduated from Cumberland University in 1858. He then had to go to Cuba due to poor health. He was able to return to New Orleans on the last ship to enter the port before the Union blockade, the Habana. After returning, Richard joined the Confederate States Army, but, after briefly serving, he had to return home (to Tunica County, Mississippi) after suffering a stroke of paralysis.

== Career ==
Abbay read law under General James R. Chalmers and was admitted to the Tennessee bar in 1867. After four years, he stopped practicing law to focus on his family plantation in Tunica County, Mississippi. Abbay was first elected to the Mississippi House of Representatives, representing Tunica County as a Democrat in 1887 for the 1888–1890 term. He was re-elected (in 1889) for the 1890–1892 term. Abbay also served on the 1890 Mississippi Constitutional Convention. Abbay served again in the House from 1896 to 1900. He was elected to the Mississippi State Senate in 1899 to represent the 34th district, which composed of Mississippi's Coahoma, Quitman, and Tunica counties, from 1900 to 1904.

== Later life ==
Abbay died at his home in Commerce, Mississippi, on June 5, 1919.
