= W. W. Magruder =

American politician (1867–1934)

Member of the Mississippi State Senate from the 23rd district
- In office January 5, 1904 – January 7, 1908
- Preceded by: J. Lem Seawright
- Succeeded by: J. Lem Seawright

Personal details
- Born: December 14, 1867 Hazlewood, Mississippi
- Died: February 4, 1934 (aged 66) Starkville, Mississippi, U. S.
- Party: Democratic

William Wailes Magruder (December 14, 1867 - February 4, 1934) was an American politician and lawyer. He represented the 23rd District in the Mississippi State Senate from 1904 to 1908.

== Early life ==
William Wailes Magruder was born on December 14, 1867, in Hazlewood, Mississippi. He was the son of Dr. Augustin Freeland Magruder and Julia (Abbey) Magruder. He was of Scottish descent. Magruder attended Yazoo City's primary schools. He entered the University of Mississippi in 1883 and stayed until 1885. Then, Magruder entered Mississippi A & M College. He graduated with a B. S. degree in 1887. Magruder then attended the University of Mississippi School of Law in 1894. He graduated with special distinction and a L. L. B. degree in June 1895.

== Career ==
Magruder began practicing law in Starkville, Mississippi, in 1895. He formed a law firm with T. B. Carroll in 1896. In 1898, he became the president of the Security State Bank. He also served as President of the Starkville public schools' Board of Trustees. He served on the County and District Democratic Executive committees. In 1903, Magruder ran to represent the 23rd District (Oktibbeha and Choctaw Counties) as a Democrat in the Mississippi State Senate for the 1904-1908 term. He won the general election on November 3, 1903. After his Senate term, Magruder continued practicing law.

By 1918, he had a law firm with B. M. Walker Jr. and L. L. Martin. In April 1918, Magruder announced his candidacy to succeed E. S. Candler for Mississippi's 1st Congressional District. In June 1920, he announced his candidacy for the same district. Magruder was elected district court judge in 1934.

Magruder died at his home in Starkville after a two-week illness on February 4, 1937.

== Personal life ==
Magruder was a member of the Methodist Church, where he was a steward. He was also a member of the Knights of Pythias. Magruder married Clemmie A. Henry on May 29, 1888, in Starkville. They had three children: William Wailes, Robert Henry, and Augustin Freeland.
