= J. T. Parks =

American lawyer and politician

Member of the Mississippi State Senate from the 2nd district
- In office January 5, 1904 – June 1905
- Preceded by: F. M. Sheppard
- Succeeded by: R. S. Hall

Personal details
- Born: August 1, 1878 Newton County, Mississippi, U. S.
- Died: June 1905 (aged 26)
- Party: Democratic

James Thompson Parks (August 1, 1878 - June 1905) was an American lawyer and politician. He represented the 2nd District in the Mississippi State Senate in 1904.

== Biography ==
James Thompson Parks was born on August 1, 1878, in Newton County, Mississippi. He was the son of John Bassett Parks and Sarah (Pettey) Parks. Parks attended the high school of Philadelphia, Mississippi. He then attended Southern Normal University for one year in 1899. He then moved to Carthage, Mississippi, in September 1900, where he started practicing law, after working as a public school teacher. On February 1, 1901, Parks moved to Hattiesburg, Mississippi, and continued practicing law there. Parks then ran for the Democratic nomination to represent the 2nd District (Perry, Jones, Wayne, Greene Counties) in the Mississippi State Senate for the 1904-1908 term, and won the nomination on August 27, 1903. Parks then won the general election on November 3, 1903. During the 1904 session, Parks served on the following committees: Judiciary; Military; Public Health & Quarantine; and the Joint Committee on Enrolled Bills. Parks died in June 1905. R. S. Hall was elected to replace him in the Senate for the 1906 session.

== Personal life ==
Parks was a Methodist. He was a member of the Freemasons and the Knights of Pythias. He never married.
