= James Alexander Ventress =

19th-century politician in Mississippi

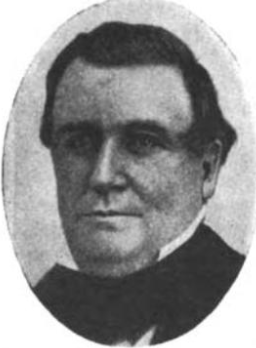
James Alexander Ventress

James Alexander Ventress (1805–1867) was a lawyer, inventor, plantation owner, and state legislator in Mississippi. He served five terms in the state house and then two in the state senate.

He was born in Tennessee and moved to Mississippi with his family as a child. He studied at a school in Wilkinson County, Mississippi, an academy in New Orleans, and then in Europe for several years. He pursued scientific research, was an avid reader and book collector, and an inventor. He served in the Mississippi Senate and Mississippi House of Representatives, including as its speaker.

He married Charlotte Davis Pyncheon. They had several children, some died young. W. P. S. Ventress, his son, followed him into state politics.
