= George Anderson (Mississippi politician) =

American politician

Member of the Mississippi State Senate from the 12th district
- In office January 1918 – January 1920
- Preceded by: G. Edward Williams

Member of the Mississippi House of Representatives from the Warren County district
- In office January 1920 – January 1924
- In office January 1896 – February 25, 1901

Personal details
- Born: September 10, 1856 Carroll County, Mississippi, U.S.
- Died: July 8, 1926 (aged 69) Memphis, Tennessee, U.S.
- Party: Democratic

George Anderson (September 10, 1856 – July 8, 1926) was an American politician. He served in both houses of the Mississippi Legislature in the late 19th and early 20th centuries.

== Early life ==
He was born on September 10, 1856, in Carroll County, Mississippi. He attended the country schools of Holmes and Carroll Counties. Anderson attended Cumberland University, graduating with a Bachelor of Laws degree in 1875. Anderson then attended Mississippi College from September 1875 to June 1878, graduating with a Bachelor of Science degree. He began practicing law in 1879 in Vaiden, Mississippi, and moved to Vicksburg, Mississippi, in 1885, and continued practicing law there.

== Political career ==
In 1895, Anderson was elected to represent Warren County as a Democrat in the Mississippi House of Representatives, and served in the 1896-1900 term. He was re-elected to the House in 1899 for the 1900-1904 term. Anderson resigned from the House in February 1901 after he was appointed to be the circuit judge for the 9th Judicial District. He held that position until his term ended in 1905. In 1906, Anderson became the City Attorney of Vicksburg, and continued holding this position until after 1920. In February 1917, Anderson (the only candidate) was elected to represent the 12th District (which rotated between Hinds and Warren counties) in the Mississippi State Senate in the 1918 legislative session. In 1919, Anderson was again elected to the House for the 1920-1924 term.

== Personal life ==
Anderson married Mary Moyselle Wells in 1880. After her death, Anderson remarried to Bertha C. Clausman, and they had at least two children together. Anderson died on July 8, 1926, in Memphis, Tennessee.
