= Gerard Brandon (state senator) =

Former American politician

Member of the Mississippi State Senate from the 9th district
- In office January 3, 1906 – January 7, 1908
- Preceded by: James A. Clinton
- Succeeded by: Charles F. Engle

Personal details
- Born: November 5, 1861 Washington, Mississippi, U. S.
- Died: August 14, 1956 (aged 94) Natchez, Mississippi, U. S.
- Party: Democratic

Gerard Brandon IV (November 5, 1861 - August 14, 1956) was an American lawyer and politician. He represented the 9th District in the Mississippi State Senate from 1906 to 1908.

== Early life ==
Gerard Brandon IV was born in Washington, Mississippi, on November 5, 1861. He was the son of Dr. James C. Brandon and Anna (Monette) Brandon. His siblings included two sisters, Margaret and Louise. His paternal grandfather was Mississippi governor Gerard C. Brandon. The younger Gerard attended Jefferson College. He then attended the University of Mississippi, where he was a member of Sigma Chi fraternity. Brandon graduated in June 1882, receiving a Bachelor of Arts and Master of Arts.

== Career ==
In September 1882, Brandon was appointed principal of the Natchez Institute. He later resigned to take a role in the Natchez Savings Bank. He then was admitted to the bar in 1889 and started practicing law in September 1891 alongside Richard F. Reed. That law firm specialized in corporate and commercial law. On December 30, 1905, Brandon was elected without opposition to replace James A. Clinton in the Mississippi State Senate, representing the 9th District (Adams County). He was sworn in on January 3, 1906. He later served as a City Solicitor of Natchez. By 1918, Brandon was part of the Reed, Brandon & Bowman law firm alongside Reed and William C. Bowman. By 1928, Brandon was running the Brandon & Brandon law firm in Natchez. By 1956, his law firm was called Brandon, Brandon, Hornsby, and Handy.

Brandon died about noon on August 14, 1956, in Natchez.

== Personal life ==
Brandon had two sons, Gerard H. Brandon and James Brandon. He also had a daughter who married W. H. Richey. At the time of his death he was survived by 10 grandchildren and 20 great-grandchildren.
