= E. H. Moore (politician) =

Former American politician

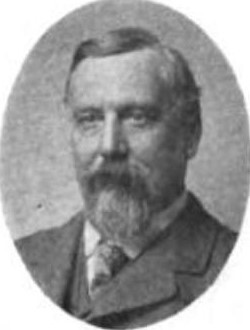
- c. 1904

President pro tempore of the Mississippi State Senate
- In office January 5, 1904 – January 1908
- Preceded by: William Gwin Kiger
- Succeeded by: John L. Hebron Jr.

Member of the Mississippi State Senate from the 30th district
- In office January 2, 1894 – January 1908
- Preceded by: George Y. Scott
- Succeeded by: John C. Burrus

Personal details
- Born: November 8, 1852 Huntsville, Alabama, U.S.
- Died: April 13, 1908 (aged 55) Cleveland, Mississippi, U.S.
- Party: Democratic

Edward Harris Moore (November 8, 1852 – April 13, 1908) was an American Democratic politician and lawyer. He represented Bolivar County in the Mississippi State Senate from 1894 to 1908, and was its president pro tempore from 1904 to 1908.

== Early life ==
Edward Harris Moore was born on November 8, 1852, in Huntsville, Alabama. He was the son of William Henry Moore (died 1891) and Margaret (Harris) Moore. William Henry Moore was a paternal nephew of Alabama Governor Gabriel Moore. Edward Moore attended the Green Academy in Huntsville and then Wilson's School in Alamance County, North Carolina. He then attended the Virginia Military Institute. Moore then "read law in a private office at Huntsville". In 1873, Moore was admitted to the bar in Bolivar County, Mississippi, and moved to Rosedale there to practice law. Moore was a law partner first with Judge F. A. Montgomery, and then with Fred Clark.

== Political career ==
Moore was the president of the Bolivar County Board of Supervisors in 1891 and 1892. In 1893, Moore was elected to fill a vacancy and represent the 30th District (consisting of Bolivar County) as a Democrat in the Mississippi State Senate for the 1894 session. Moore was re-elected on November 7, 1895, for the 1896–1900 term. In 1896, Moore became chairman of the Senate's Judicial Committee. Moore was re-elected in 1899 for the 1900–1904 term. During the 1902 session, Moore introduced the bill that established the Mississippi Department of Archives and History, which passed on February 26 of that year.

Moore was then re-elected in November 1903 for the 1904–1908 term. On January 5, 1904, the first day of the session, Moore was unanimously elected to be the Senate's president pro tempore for the term. During this term, Moore served in the following Senate committees: Rules; Local & Private Registration; Corporations; Levees; and Insurance. He also served on the joint Redistricting Judicial Districts Committee. Moore withdrew his candidacy for re-election in 1907 and was succeeded in the 1908–1912 term by John C. Burrus.

Moore died at his home in Cleveland, Mississippi, on April 13, 1908, and was survived by his wife and daughter.

== Personal life ==
Moore married Martha Montgomery on December 4, 1873, in Bolivar County. Martha's father, Judge Frank A. Montgomery (1830–1903), was a descendant of Mississippi's Territorial Secretary Cato West. Edward and Martha had one daughter, Lotta Clark. Lotta was married to Vicksburg lawyer A. A. Armstead.
