= Robert S. Hall =

American politician (1879–1941)

Member of the U.S. House of Representatives from Mississippi's 6th district
- In office March 4, 1929 – March 3, 1933
- Preceded by: T. Webber Wilson
- Succeeded by: William M. Colmer

Member of the Mississippi State Senate
- In office 1906–1908

Personal details
- Born: Robert Samuel Hall; March 10, 1879 Williamsburg, Mississippi, U.S.
- Died: June 10, 1941 (aged 62) Arlington, Virginia, U.S.
- Resting place: Old City Cemetery, Hattiesburg, Mississippi, U.S.
- Party: Democratic
- Education: Millsaps College
- Profession: Politician, lawyer

Robert Samuel Hall (March 10, 1879 – June 10, 1941) was an American lawyer and politician who served two terms as a U.S. representative from Mississippi from 1929 to 1933.

== Biography ==
Born in Williamsburg, Mississippi, Hall attended the common schools of Williamsburg and Hattiesburg, Mississippi. He taught school in Hancock County, Mississippi, in 1894. He was graduated from Millsaps College, Jackson, Mississippi, in 1898. He owned and edited the Hattiesburg Citizen from 1895 to 1900 and from 1920 to 1925.

=== Early political activities ===
Hall was graduated from the law department of Millsaps College in 1900. He was admitted to the bar the same year and commenced practice in Hattiesburg.

He served as member of the State senate from 1906 to 1908. He served as delegate to the Democratic National Convention in 1908. He served as prosecuting attorney of Forrest County from 1910 to 1912, as district attorney of the twelfth judicial district from 1912 to 1918, and as circuit judge of that district from 1918 to 1929.

=== Congress ===
Hall was elected as a Democrat to the Seventy-first and Seventy-second Congresses (March 4, 1929 – March 3, 1933). He served as chairman of the Committee on Irrigation and Reclamation (Seventy-second Congress). He was an unsuccessful candidate for renomination in 1932.

=== Later career and death ===
He was employed in the legal division of the Federal Trade Commission in Washington, D.C., from 1933 until his death in Arlington, Virginia, June 10, 1941. He was interred in the Old City Cemetery, Hattiesburg, Mississippi.

U.S. House of Representatives
Preceded by T. Webber Wilson	Member of the U.S. House of Representatives from Mississippi's 6th congressional district 1929–1933	Succeeded by William M. Colmer
