= Eagle Bend, Mississippi =

- Census-designated place
- Location within Mississippi Location within the United States
- Coordinates: 32°30′44″N 90°59′40″W
- Country: United States
- State: Mississippi
- County: Warren

Area
  - Total: 2.77 sq mi (7.18 km^{2})
  - Land: 1.67 sq mi (4.33 km^{2})
  - Water: 1.10 sq mi (2.85 km^{2})
- Elevation: 72 ft (22 m)

Population (2020)
  - Total: 296
  - Density: 177.2/sq mi (68.42/km^{2})
- Time zone: UTC-6 (Central (CST))
  - Summer (DST): UTC-5 (CDT)
- GNIS feature ID: 2812749

Eagle Bend is a census-designated place and unincorporated community in Warren County, Mississippi. It is approximately 31 miles northwest of downtown Vicksburg, and is part of the Vicksburg Micropolitan Statistical Area.

Eagle Bend began as a postal hamlet located directly on the Mississippi River. In 1866, the river changed its course and created a natural cutoff called "Terrapin Neck". The former bend in the river soon silted up at either end, creating Eagle Lake, an oxbow lake.

The population of Eagle Bend was 50 in 1900. Per the 2020 Census, the population was 296.

Eagle Bend is situated on the east shore of Eagle Lake, and is popular for fishing and water sports.

== Demographics ==
Historical population
Census	Pop.	Note	%±
2020	296		—
U.S. Decennial Census; 2020

Eagle Bend was first listed as a census designated place in the 2020 U.S. census.

=== 2020 census ===
Eagle Bend CDP, Mississippi – Racial and ethnic composition Note: the US Census treats Hispanic/Latino as an ethnic category. This table excludes Latinos from the racial categories and assigns them to a separate category. Hispanics/Latinos may be of any race.
Race / Ethnicity (NH = Non-Hispanic)	Pop 2020	% 2020
White alone (NH)	272	91.89%
Black or African American alone (NH)	20	6.76%
Native American or Alaska Native alone (NH)	0	0.00%
Asian alone (NH)	0	0.00%
Native Hawaiian or Pacific Islander alone (NH)	0	0.00%
Other race alone (NH)	0	0.00%
Mixed race or Multiracial (NH)	2	0.68%
Hispanic or Latino (any race)	2	0.68%
Total	296	100.00%
