= Otho S. Robbins =

American politician

- c. 1903

Member of the Mississippi House of Representatives from the Warren County district
- In office January 1900 – January 1908

Personal details
- Born: August 18, 1855 Ludlow, Mississippi
- Died: 1927 (aged 71–72) Mississippi
- Party: Democrat
- Children: 2

Otho Singleton Robbins (August 18, 1855 - 1927) was a Democratic member of the Mississippi House of Representatives, representing Warren County, from 1900 to 1908.

== Biography ==
Otho Singleton Robbins was born on August 18, 1855, in Ludlow, Mississippi. He was the son of Nathaniel Robbins, who represented Marion County in the Mississippi House in 1837, and his wife, Susan (Davis) Robbins. He attended the primary schools of Scott County. After reading law, he was admitted to the bar in 1880. He was a lawyer and a planter. He was elected to the Mississippi House of Representatives, representing Warren County as a Democrat, in 1899. He was re-elected in 1903, for the 1904-1908 term. He died in Mississippi in 1927.

== Personal life ==
Robbins married Mary Ellen Vick in 1886. They had two children, Fannie and Mamie. Robbins had no religious preference.
