= W. P. S. Ventress =

American politician (1854–1911)

Member of the Mississippi Senate from the 7th district
- In office January 1900 – January 1902
- Preceded by: W. I. Causey
- Succeeded by: Charles H. Frith

Member of the Mississippi House of Representatives from the Wilkinson County district
- In office January 1892 – January 1900

Personal details
- Born: May 28, 1854 Wilkinson County, MS
- Died: November 22, 1911 (aged 57) Woodville, MS
- Party: Democrat
- Children: 3

William Pynchon Stewart Ventress (May 28, 1854 - November 22, 1911) was a Democratic member of the Mississippi state legislature in the late 19th and early 20th centuries.

== Early life ==
William Pynchon Stewart Ventress was born on May 28, 1854, in Wilkinson County, Mississippi. He was the son of James Alexander Ventress, who was the Speaker of the Mississippi House of Representatives from 1841 to 1842, and his wife, Charlotte (Pynchon) Ventress. He received his early education from private tutors. He attended the University of Virginia for one session before attending the University of Mississippi, from which he graduated in 1873 with a Bachelor of Laws degree. He then practiced law in Woodville, Mississippi.

== Political career ==
In 1891, Ventress was elected to the Mississippi House of Representatives, where he represented Wilkinson County as a Democrat from 1892 to 1900. He was then elected to the Mississippi Senate, where he represented the state's 7th district, which was composed of Amite and Wilkinson counties, in the 1900 session. Before the 1902 session, Mississippi's governor, Andrew H. Longino, appointed Ventress as the chancellor of the fourth Chancery district, a position from which he retired in 1906.

== Later life ==
After retiring, Ventress continued practicing law. He was then a member of the board of trustees of the Edward McGehee College. He died in his home in Woodville, Mississippi, on November 22, 1911.

== Personal life ==
Ventress was a Methodist. He married Willie Galloway, daughter of Methodist bishop Charles Galloway, in 1893. They had three children, Harriet, Charles, and Margaret.
