= Clayton D. Potter =

American judge (1880–1924)

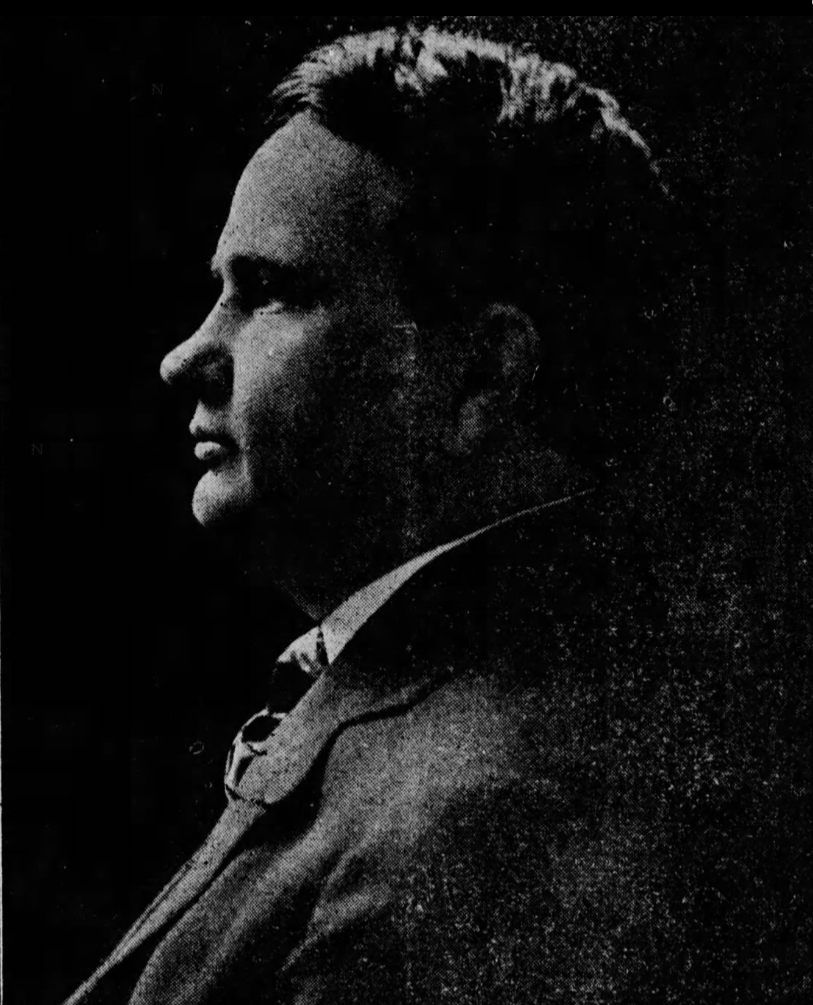
Potter in 1916

Clayton D. Potter (January 12, 1880 – September 1, 1924) was a justice of the Supreme Court of Mississippi from 1916 to 1917, and attorney general of Mississippi from 1922 to 1924.

== Biography ==
Born on January 12, 1880, in Hinds County, Mississippi, near Jackson, Potter was a son of Daniel Mayes Potter and Octavia Smith Potter. He first attended the Liberty Grove school, near Jackson, and later attended the Jackson public schools. He graduated from the literary department of Millsans College in 1902. He read law to gain admission to the bar in 1904, thereafter practicing in Jackson. From 1905 to 1912, he sat in the Mississippi State Senate.

Potter managed the 1915 election campaign of Governor Theodore G. Bilbo and "was appointed by Governor Bilbo in January 1916 to one of the three new judgeships". When Potter ran for election to the seat, his opponent, George H. Ethridge, made several allegations against him, including that he "had promised when accepting the governor's January appointment that he would not be a candidate for a full term", and that Potter only wanted the brief appointment to the court to bolster his reputation in his legal practice. Ethridge led the vote in the August 15 Democratic primary and won the September 5 run-off by a more substantial margin.

In 1922, Governor Lee M. Russell appointed Potter attorney general of Mississippi, to fill the vacancy caused by the resignation of Frank Robertson. Potter completed the term and then returned to private practice.

Potter never married. He died in a car accident outside Raymond, Mississippi, on September 1, 1924, aged 44.

Political offices
Preceded by Newly established seat	Justice of the Supreme Court of Mississippi; 1916–1917	Succeeded by George H. Ethridge
