= Lorraine C. Dulaney =

American politician

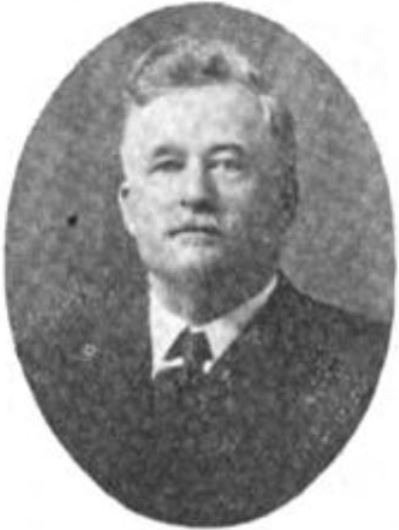
- c. 1917

Member of the Mississippi State Senate from the 20th district
- In office January 1916 – January 1920
- In office January 1900 – January 1904

Member of the Mississippi House of Representatives from the Issaquena County district
- In office January 1904 – January 1908
- In office January 1892 – January 1896

Personal details
- Born: December 25, 1863 Madison County, Mississippi
- Died: November 30, 1945 (aged 81) Grace, Mississippi
- Party: Democratic

Lorraine Catchings Dulaney (December 25, 1863 – November 30, 1945) was an American planter and Democratic politician. He served in both houses of the Mississippi State Legislature in the late 19th and early 20th centuries.

== Biography ==
Lorraine Catchings Dulaney was born on December 25, 1863, in Madison County, Mississippi. He was the son of William Johnson Dulaney and his wife, Lorraine (Catchings) Dulaney. He was of French descent. Dulaney attended the public schools of Madison County, and graduated from Poughkeepsie Business College in New York in 1882. Dulaney was a planter, merchant, and railroad and levee contractor. A Democrat, he represented Issaquena County in the Mississippi House of Representatives from 1892 to 1896. From 1900 to 1904, he represented the 20th District in the Mississippi State Senate. In November 1903, he was elected to another term in the House and served from 1904 to 1908. He served again in the Senate in the same district from 1916 to 1920.

Dulaney died on November 30, 1945, at his home in Grace, Mississippi.

=== Bribery charges ===
In 1910, Dulaney was charged for attempting to bribe state senator Theodore G. Bilbo to vote for LeRoy Percy for the U. S. Senate. Dulaney was acquitted.
