= William Gwin Kiger =

American physician and Democratic politician

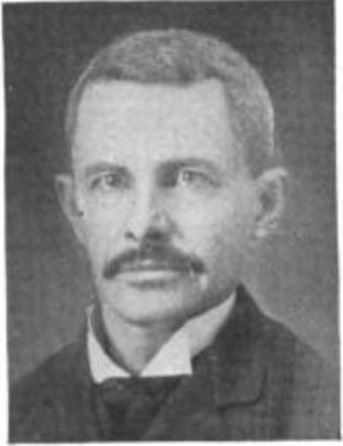
- c. 1923

President Pro Tempore of the Mississippi State Senate
- In office January 8, 1902 – January 1904
- Preceded by: John R. Dinsmore
- Succeeded by: E. H. Moore

Member of the Mississippi State Senate from the 12th district
- In office January 1920 – January 1932
- In office January 1892 – January 1904

Personal details
- Born: August 5, 1847 Eagle Bend, Mississippi
- Died: July 19, 1934 (aged 86) Eagle Bend, Mississippi
- Party: Democratic

William Gwin Kiger (August 5, 1847 – July 19, 1934) was an American physician and Democratic politician. He represented the 12th District in the Mississippi State Senate from 1892 to 1904 and from 1920 to 1932, and served as the Senate's President Pro Tempore in 1902.

== Early life ==
William Gwin Kiger was born on August 5, 1847, on his father's plantation in Eagle Bend, Mississippi. He was the son of Colonel Basil G. Kiger, a plantation owner, and Carolyn Isabel (Gwin) Kiger. Kiger graduated from the University of Virginia and then graduated with a M. D. from Tulane University in 1876. Kiger became a farmer and physician. Kiger lived in the family plantation in Eagle Bend, Mississippi, for his entire life.

== Political career ==
In 1891, Kiger was nominated by the Democratic Party and elected to represent 12th District (Warren County) in the Mississippi State Senate for the 1892–1896 term. During this term, Kiger served as the chairman of the public health and quarantine committee. Also from 1892 to 1893, Kiger was the president of the Mississippi State Medical Association. He was re-elected in 1895 and served in the 1896–1900 term. During this term, Kiger was the chairman of the Senate's committee on corporations. In the Senate, Kiger also led the creation of the Mississippi Department of Public Health. From 1895 to after 1899, Kiger was the president of the Mississippi State Board of Health. In 1899, Kiger was one of 3 senators re-elected for the 1900–1904 term.

On the second day of the 1902 session (January 8), after the death (in April 1900) of incumbent President Pro Tempore John R. Dinsmore, an election was held among the senators to replace him. Kiger and E. H. Moore were nominated for the position, but Moore asked for his name to be withdrawn. Kiger then won the election and became the Senate's President pro tempore for the 1902 session.

In 1919, Kiger was elected to represent the 12th District for the 1920-1924 term. During this term, Kiger was the chairman of the Fisheries and Game Committee as well as the Oyster Industry Committee. Kiger was re-elected in 1923 and served in the 1924-1928 term. He was re-elected to the Senate in 1927 and served in the 1928-1932 term.

Kiger died on the morning of July 19, 1934, in Eagle Bend, Mississippi.

== Personal life ==
Kiger was a member of the Episcopal Church. He never married.
