= Albert Tatum Dent =

American politician

Member of the Mississippi State Senate from the 16th district
- In office January 1924 – November 1929
- In office January 1902 – January 1908
- Preceded by: John R. Dinsmore

Mayor of Macon, Mississippi
- In office 1884–1888

Personal details
- Born: March 25, 1863 Noxubee County, Mississippi, U. S.
- Died: December 13, 1929 (aged 66) Macon, Mississippi, U. S.
- Party: Democratic

Albert Tatum Dent (March 25, 1863 - December 13, 1929) was an American lawyer and politician in Mississippi. He lived in Macon, served in the state senate (1902-1908 and 1924-1929), served as an alderman, and as mayor of Macon (1884-1888). He was a Democrat.

== Early life and education ==
Albert Tatum Dent was born on March 25, 1863, in Noxubee County, Mississippi. He was the son of William Dent and Mary (Witherspoon) Dent. Albert was of English descent.

Tatum attended the University of Mississippi for two years but left due to poor health. He was admitted to the bar in 1884.

== Career ==
He served as the Mayor of Macon, Mississippi from 1884 to 1888. He then served as Alderman of Macon from 1892 to 1900. In 1901, Dent was elected to represent the 16th District in the Mississippi State Senate, filling in the unfinished term of John R. Dinsmore, who died in office. In 1903, Dent was appointed Trustee of Mississippi A & M College (now Mississippi State University). Dent was re-elected to a full Senate term in 1903 for the 1904-1908 term. He was then re-elected in 1923 to serve the 1924-1928 term. He was re-elected again in 1927, but retired in November 1929 due to poor health.

After retiring from the Senate, Dent moved to Memphis, Tennessee. He died on December 13, 1929, shortly after giving a speech to the Freemasons in Macon, Mississippi.

== Personal life ==
Dent married Anna Dent Minor on September 8, 1887, near Shuqualak, Mississippi. She was a great-niece of both John B. Minor and James Longstreet. They had ten children: Henry Minor, William E., Albert Tatum, Mary Cooper, Emmet Cooper, Francis Washington, Lancelot Longstreet, Lucian Weatherspoon, Emmet Roy, and Anna Louise.
