= General Lee (disambiguation) =

General Lee commonly refers to the Confederate States Army General Robert E. Lee.

General Lee may also refer to:

== People ==
- Albert Lindley Lee (1834–1907), Union Army brigadier general
- Benjamin Lee (general) (1774–1828), North Carolina State Militia brigadier general
- Charles Lee (general) (c. 1732–1782), Continental Army major general
- Edward M. Lee (1835–1913), Union Army brevet brigadier general
- Edwin Gray Lee (1836–1870), Confederate States Army brigadier general, cousin of Robert
- Fitzhugh Lee (1835–1905), Confederate States and United States Army major general, nephew of Robert
- George Washington Custis Lee (1832–1913), Confederate States Army major general, son of Robert
- Harry Lee (United States Marine) (1872–1935), U.S. Marine Corps general
- Harry Lee (sheriff) (1932–2007), U.S. National Guard general
- Henry Lee III (1756–1818), U.S. Army major general during the Whiskey Rebellion, father of Robert E. Lee
- James Madison Lee (1926–2017), U.S. Army general
- John C. H. Lee (1887–1958), U.S. Army lieutenant general during World War II
- Robert Merrill Lee (1909–2003), U.S. Air Force general
- Stephen D. Lee (1833–1908), Confederate States Army lieutenant general
- William C. Lee (1895–1948), U.S. Army major general during World War II
- William Henry Fitzhugh Lee (1837–1891), Confederate States Army major general, son of Robert
- William Lee (American judge) (died c. 1823), Georgia Volunteer Militia brigadier general

=== Fictional ===
- General Tani, a Takeshi's Castle character known as General Lee in the UK and Indian versions

== Other ==
- M3 Lee, medium tank used in World War II
- General Beauregard Lee, one of the groundhogs that predicts the weather on the American Groundhog Day holiday
- General Lee (car), a fictional automobile driven by Bo and Luke Duke in the 1979–1985 American television series The Dukes of Hazzard.
- "The General Lee" (song), a 1981 song by Johnny Cash for The Dukes of Hazzard soundtrack

== See also ==
- Attorney General Lee (disambiguation)
