= Good Hope, Marion County, Mississippi =

Good Hope, Mississippi
- Unincorporated community
- Location within Mississippi Location within the United States
- Coordinates: 31°21′46″N 89°45′50″W
- Country: United States
- State: Mississippi
- County: Marion
- Elevation: 367 ft (112 m)
- Time zone: UTC-6 (Central (CST))
  - Summer (DST): UTC-5 (CDT)
- Area codes: 601 & 769
- GNIS feature ID: 710539

Good Hope is an unincorporated community in Marion County, Mississippi, United States. Good Hope is located on Good Hope Road 8.8 miles (14.2 km) north-northeast of Columbia.
