= S. J. Hathorn =

American politician (1873-1918)

Member of the Mississippi State Senate from the 39th district
- In office 1917–1918

Member of the Mississippi House of Representatives from the Marion County district
- In office January 1904 – January 1908

Personal details
- Born: September 5, 1873 Covington County, Mississippi, U.S.
- Died: September 10, 1918 (aged 45)
- Party: Democratic

Stanley Jay Hathorn (September 5, 1873 – September 10, 1918) was an American politician. A resident of Columbia, Mississippi, he was a member of the Mississippi State Senate from 1917 to 1920 and of the Mississippi House of Representatives from 1904 to 1908.

== Biography ==
Stanley Jay Hathorn was born on September 5, 1873, in Hollidy's Creek, Covington County, Mississippi. He was the son of Nevin Clowny Hathorn, a member of Mississippi's 1890 Constitutional Convention, and Susan (Cooper) Hathorn. Hathorn attended the high school in Columbia, Mississippi. He was a teacher from 1890 to 1897. On November 3, 1903, Hathorn was elected to represent Marion County as a Democrat in the Mississippi House of Representatives for the 1904-1908 term. From 1912 to 1916, he was the County Sheriff of Marion County. Hathorn represented the 39th District in the Mississippi State Senate in the 1917 and 1918 sessions. Hathorn died in 1918.

== Personal life ==
Hathorn was a member of the Baptist Church. He married Bettie Amanda Holloway on March 27, 1895. They had a son named Clarence.
