= Hopewell, Marion County, Mississippi =

Hopewell, Mississippi
- Unincorporated community
- Location within Mississippi Location within the United States
- Coordinates: 31°20′10″N 89°39′40″W
- Country: United States
- State: Mississippi
- County: Marion
- Elevation: 276 ft (84 m)
- Time zone: UTC-6 (Central (CST))
  - Summer (DST): UTC-5 (CDT)
- Area codes: 601 & 769
- GNIS feature ID: 710547

Hopewell is an unincorporated community in Marion County, Mississippi, United States. Hopewell is located 5 miles (8.0 km) northeast of Columbia. Hopewell was one of the first settled communities in Marion County.
