= Thomas Z. Gipson =

Mississippi politician

Member of the Mississippi House of Representatives
- In office 1964–1968

Personal details
- Born: Thomas Zachariah Gipson; October 2, 1923 Baton Rouge, Louisiana
- Died: June 9, 2012 (aged 88) Columbia, Mississippi
- Party: Democratic

Thomas Z. "Hoot" Gipson (October 2, 1923 - June 9, 2012) was a pharmacist and politician in Mississippi. A Democrat, he served in the Mississippi House of Representatives between 1964–1968. He was born in Baton Rouge, Louisiana.

Gipson was a member of the House Game and Fish Committee.
