= Johnathan Abram =

American football player (born 1996)

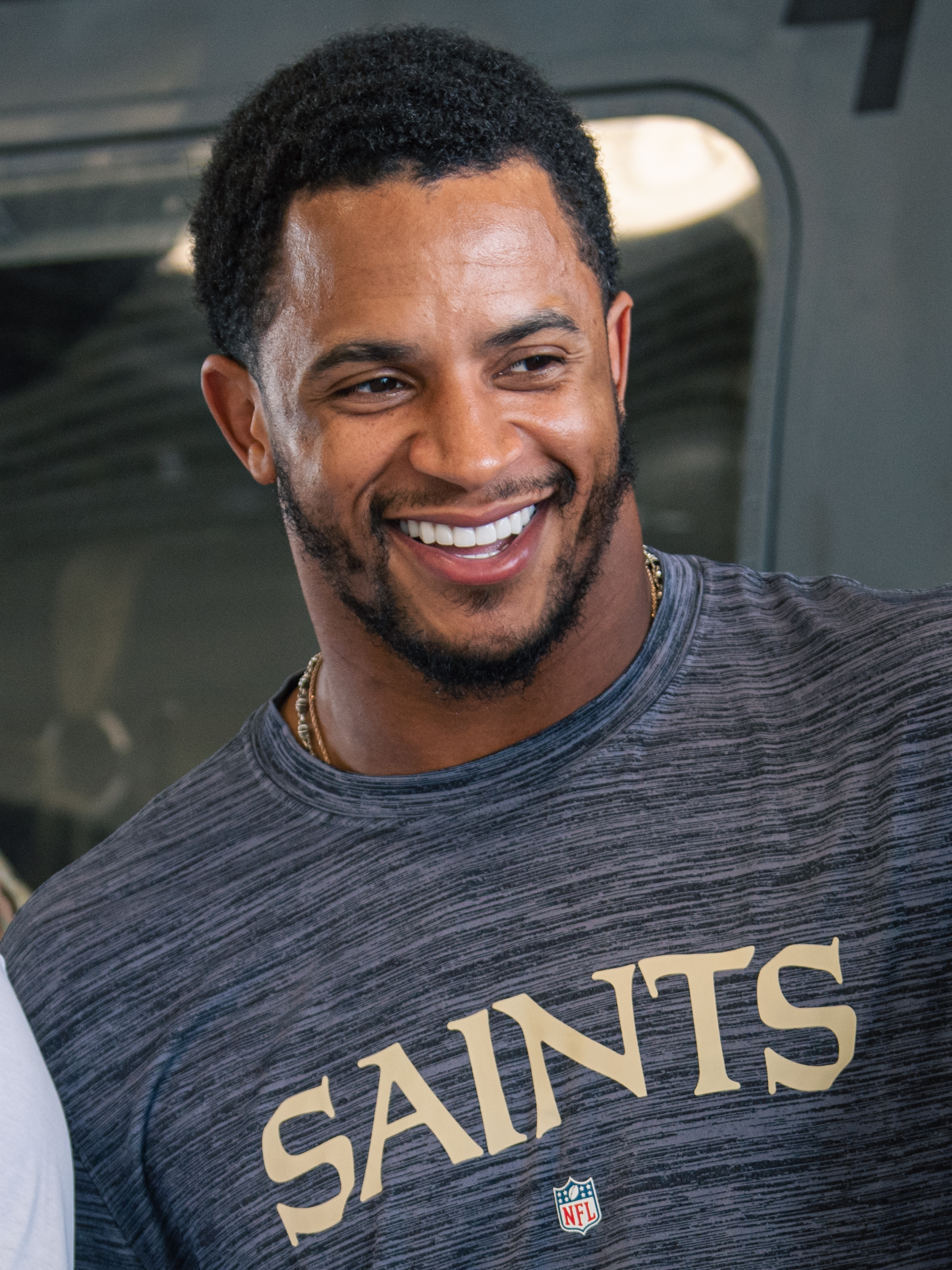
- Abram with the New Orleans Saints in 2023

Profile
- Position: Safety

Personal information
- Born: October 25, 1996 (age 30); Columbia, Mississippi, U.S.
- Listed height: 5 ft 11 in (1.80 m)
- Listed weight: 205 lb (93 kg)

Career information
- High school: East Marion (Columbia)
- College: Georgia (2015); Jones County JC (2016); Mississippi State (2017–2018)
- NFL draft: 2019: 1st round, 27th overall pick

Career history
- Oakland / Las Vegas Raiders (2019–2022); Green Bay Packers (2022); Seattle Seahawks (2022); New Orleans Saints (2023–2024)

Awards and highlights
- Third-team All-American (2018); First-team All-SEC (2018)

Career NFL statistics as of 2024
- Total tackles: 311
- Forced fumbles: 1
- Fumble recoveries: 2
- Pass deflections: 17
- Interceptions: 5
- Stats at Pro Football Reference

Johnathan Jauquez Abram (born October 25, 1996) is an American former professional football safety. He played college football at Mississippi State and Georgia and went to high school at East Marion High School where he played high school football for the East Marion Eagles.

== College career ==
A 2-star recruit, Abram committed to Georgia on November 1, 2014. Following his freshman season at Georgia, Abram announced that he would be transferring out. After transferring to Jones College, Abram received a scholarship from the University of Georgia again, four months after leaving. On December 16, 2016, Abram announced that he would be playing football at Mississippi State for his final 2 years of college eligibility. He also took snaps at linebacker in high school, so, they considered whether they should move him and take snaps there instead, at Mississippi State. Following his senior year at Mississippi State where he led the team with 93 tackles, Abram was named to the first-team All-Southeastern Conference by the media and to the second-team by the coaches. Abram was also invited to the 2019 Senior Bowl under San Francisco 49ers head coach Kyle Shanahan.

== Professional career ==
Pre-draft measurables
Height	Weight	Arm length	Hand span	40-yard dash	10-yard split	20-yard split	Vertical jump	Broad jump	Bench press
5 ft 11 3/8 in (1.81 m)	205 lb (93 kg)	31 3/8 in (0.80 m)	9 5/8 in (0.24 m)	4.45 s	1.48 s	2.60 s	33.5 in (0.85 m)	9 ft 8 in (2.95 m)	16 reps
All values from NFL Combine

=== Oakland / Las Vegas Raiders ===
==== 2019 ====
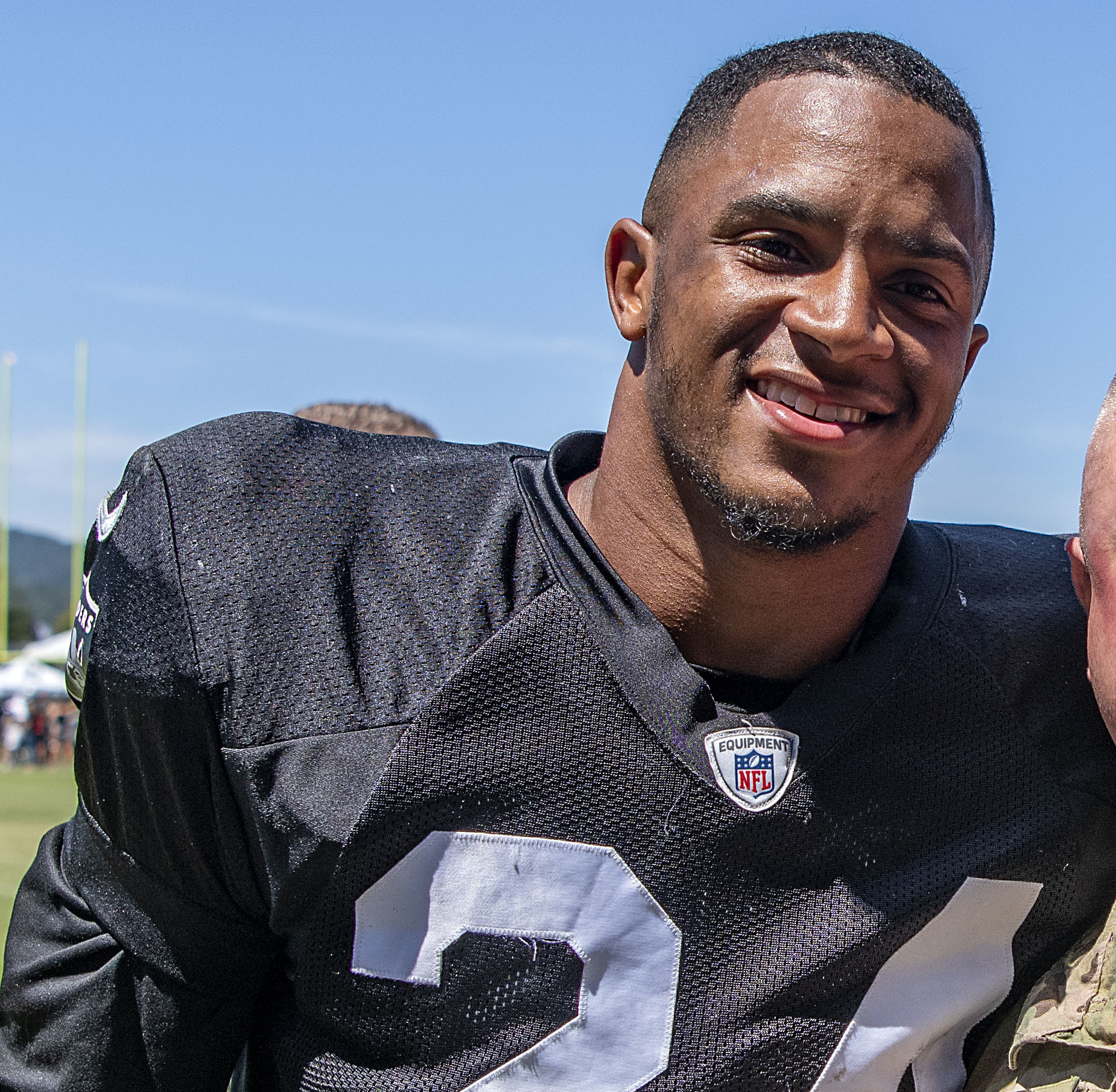
Abram with the Raiders in 2019.

The Oakland Raiders selected Abram in the first round (27th overall) of the 2019 NFL draft. Abram was selected with the first-round pick acquired from the Dallas Cowboys in the October 2018 Amari Cooper trade.

Abram made his NFL debut in week 1 against the Denver Broncos. In the game, Abram made 5 tackles in the 24–16 win. After the game, it was reported that Abram tore his rotator cuff and labrum and would be out for the remainder of the season. He was placed on injured reserve on September 13, 2019.

==== 2020 ====
Abram made his return from injury in Week 1 against the Carolina Panthers. During the game, Abram recorded a team high 13 tackles in the 34–30 win. In Week 3 against the New England Patriots, Abram recorded his first career interception off a pass thrown by Cam Newton during the 36–20 loss. In 2020, the USA TODAY referred to "Abram's lack of coverage skills and awareness is starting to become too difficult to ignore."

==== 2021 ====
Abram entered the 2021 season as the Raiders starting strong safety. He was placed on injured reserve on December 25, 2021, after undergoing shoulder surgery. He finished the season with a career-high 116 tackles, which was second on the team, and one interception through 14 starts.

==== 2022 ====
On April 29, 2022, the Raiders announced that they would not pick up the fifth-year option on Abram's contract, making him a free agent in the 2023 offseason. Abram was waived by the Raiders on November 8, 2022.

=== Green Bay Packers ===
On November 10, 2022, the Green Bay Packers claimed Abram off waivers. The Packers waived Abram on November 29.

=== Seattle Seahawks ===
Abram was claimed off waivers by the Seattle Seahawks on November 30, 2022. The Seahawks did not re-sign him after the end of the 2022 season.

=== New Orleans Saints ===
On March 22, 2023, Abram signed with the New Orleans Saints. He was waived during final roster cuts on August 29, and re-signed to the practice squad. Abram was signed to the active roster on November 30. In Week 17 against the Tampa Bay Buccaneers, Abram tallied one interception (against Baker Mayfield), one forced fumble, one pass deflection, and five tackles.

On March 20, 2024, Abram re–signed with the Saints. On August 27, he was cut during final roster cuts and re-signed to the practice squad on August 28 despite having been a contender for a starting safety role. He was released on October 22.

== NFL career statistics ==
=== Regular season ===
Year	Team	Games		Tackles				Interceptions						Fumbles	
Year	Team	GP	GS	Comb	Total	Ast	Sck	PD	Int	Yds	Avg	Lng	TDs	FF	FR
2019	OAK	1	1	5	1	4	0.0	1	0	0	0	0	0	0	0
2020	LV	13	13	86	60	26	0.0	6	2	29	14.5	24	0	0	1
2021	LV	14	14	116	64	52	0.0	4	1	6	6.0	6	0	0	1
2022	LV	8	6	48	35	13	0.0	1	0	0	0	0	0	0	0
2022	GB	2	0	2	1	1	0.0	0	0	0	0	0	0	0	0
2022	SEA	5	2	10	6	4	0.0	2	0	0	0	0	0	0	0
2023	NO	9	3	26	14	12	0.0	1	1	0	0.0	0	0	1	0
Career		52	39	293	181	112	0.0	15	4	35	11.6	24	0	1	2
Source: pro-football-referencecom

=== Postseason ===
Year	Team	Games		Tackles				Interceptions						Fumbles	
Year	Team	GP	GS	Comb	Total	Ast	Sck	PD	Int	Yds	Avg	Lng	TDs	FF	FR
2022	SEA	1	0	2	2	0	0.0	0	0	0	0	0	0	0	0
Career		1	0	2	2	0	0.0	0	0	0	0	0	0	0	0
Source: pro-football-referencecom
