= Columbia Springs =

Hotel and health spa in Mississippi, US

Coordinates: 31.289065°N 89.850913°W

Columbia Springs, also known as "Stovall's Springs," was an early hotel and health spa located on Pearl River near Columbia, Mississippi. Built by proprietor Charles Stovall early in the 19th century, it was the most famous health retreat in South Mississippi during the period, mostly catering to the aristocracy of the region. Planters, politicians, merchants and attorneys alike were drawn from as far away as New Orleans, Louisiana, and Natchez, Mississippi, likely paving the way for the hotel's temporary status as Mississippi state capital in 1821. Unfortunately, a gentleman's disagreement occurring at the hotel ultimately led to two separate dueling incidents, which likely contributed to the decline of the establishment.

== Beginnings ==
Mineral spring retreats and spas were fashionable in the early 19th century and natural springs were abundant in Marion County, Mississippi due to the Pearl River. Just north of Columbia, Mississippi, Charles Stovall constructed "Columbia Springs" near the eastern banks of Pearl River and the mouth of Buckhorn Creek. The large wood frame hotel building was three stories high with suites on each floor and verandas overlooking the Pearl River. The interiors were lavishly furnished and finished in fine hardwoods such as mahogany, oak and walnut.

Columbia Springs was advertised as having medicinal properties and promoted good health which attracted seasonal visitors, many of them the most influential in southern antebellum society. Visitors enjoyed more than bathing, they also hunted, fished, played billiards and raced horses.

While documentation is scarce, sources suggest that several soldiers of Andrew Jackson's army were sent to the springs to recuperate after the Battle of New Orleans in 1815. In 1826, shortly before Columbia Springs fell into decline, Stovall ran the following advertisement in a Natchez newspaper:

COLUMBIA SPRINGS – The public is again respectfully invited to turn its attention to these celebrated Springs, the waters of which have been found, by experience, to be efficacious in the preservation of health, and also a powerful auxiliary for the restoration of that invaluable blessing, to convalescents from acute diseases. The virtue of these waters, the salubrity of the atmosphere, and the very extensive and improved style of the accommodations since last year, will, it is confidently believed, ensure to the visitants a more desirable retreat than is to be found in this section of the United States. The mineral qualities of these waters have been tested by scientific gentlemen, and although the exact proportion of the ingredients was not accurately established, enough was ascertained to prove them highly medicinal. The predominant quality of the water is diuretic; the tonic and aperients qualities are considerable; in short, these waters promote the different secretions, by imparting tone and vigor to the system.

The Columbia Springs are situated near the bank of Pearl River, about two miles from the town of Columbia, and sixty-five miles from Covington, surrounded by a country remarkable for its health and the salubrity of its atmosphere. Large and commodious buildings, both for individuals and families, in addition to those of last year, are in a state of forwardness. Warm and cold baths, shower baths, &c are in readiness: Preparations are also making for the different species of fashionable amusements, practiced at such places; while a place of retirement is reserved for persons of serious and contemplative habits. The river and creeks, in the immediate vicinity, abound with fish of various descriptions, and the forests with game. The surrounding country is level and agreeable, and the roads are generally good. Accommodations may always be had in the town of Columbia, which is sufficiently near, to render a morning and evening ride to it, both pleasant and beneficial.

No expense or trouble will be spared, to procure every convenience and accommodation, the country will afford, to render a visit to these springs, either amusing or beneficial. For the satisfaction of the community at large, and for the better information of strangers, it may be necessary to refer to gentlemen who have visited these waters, and know their qualities; and who can give information respecting accommodations, and other particulars;-Among these, I shall only name the following gentlemen –

Gen. Ripley, A. Hennen Esq., Rev. Dr. Clapp, J. B. Curtis, Esq., Messrs, Hyde and Merritt, Mr. Aldridge, Mr. Jolly of New Orleans; Elijah Clark, Esq. of Point Coupee; Judge Jones, and Mr. Bayley of Covington; Dr. Cooper, and Col. Hamilton of St. Francisville; David Wood Esq., C. B. Green Esq., T. B. Reed Esq., Col. Joseph Sessions, Mr. Conner, Mr. Tichenor, Gov. Holmes, Judge Ellis, Capt. James K. Cook, Judge Stockton of Natchez; Gen. Joor, Harry Cage Esq., Judge Hampton, Gov. Poindexter, Col. Hadley, Mr. Haile of Wilkinson County; Cowles Meade Esq., Mr. Ross, Mr. Turnbull of Jefferson County; Mr. Vertner, Dr. David Dickson, Chancellor Clark, Judge Child, Mr. Woolley, Mr. Vandorn, Mr. Denny, and Mr. Lake of Port Gibson; Dr. T. Anderson, Mr. Hyland, Mr. Evans of Warren County; H. G. Runnels Esq., J. A. Grimball Esq. Jackson: these gentlemen, by giving as extensive publicity to this notice as may be convenient, together with such information, relative to the subject, as they may possess, will confer a particular favor on

Their humble servant, CHARLES STOVALL

Rates of Boarding- By the month, $20.00; by the week, $6.00; per day $1.00; horse per month, $15.00. An ample supply of the best of wines and spirits the New Orleans market affords, will be kept for the accommodation of visitants. April 26, 1826."

== Temporary capital of Mississippi ==
Charles Stovall served as a state representative in 1822 and through this term of office forged relationships with the powerful and influential in the region, beneficial to his resort business.

When the Mississippi legislature met in Natchez for its fourth session in February, 1821, the site of the permanent capital of Mississippi had yet to be established. As a compromise between the delegates it was voted to temporarily move the capital to Columbia, Mississippi until a permanent site could later be agreed upon. The move was passed on January 1, 1821 and recorded in Section 1 of the Mississippi Journal of the House of Representatives:

"Section I. Be it enacted by the Senate and the House of Representatives of the State of Mississippi in General Assembly convened, that after the adjournment of the present session of the General Assembly of this State, each ensuing session of the Legislature of this state shall be held at the town of Columbia, until otherwise altered by law."

Charles Stovall offered an entire wing of his hotel to the legislature for their use, which was accepted. The next regular session of the Mississippi Legislature was held in Columbia in November, 1821, and during this session Mississippi Governor George Poindexter's term expired. Subsequently, Governor Walter Leake was sworn in at Columbia Springs as Mississippi's third governor. Governor Poindexter's legal code, commonly known as "Poindexter's Code," was passed during the session, much of it written and finalized while at Columbia Springs.

The issue of the permanent site for the state capital was again discussed, and it was decided to appoint Thomas Hinds, William Lattimore and James Patton to select a permanent seat for Mississippi government, eventually settling on what is today Jackson, Mississippi. The close of the fifth legislative session on January 7, 1822 marked the end of Columbia Springs as the temporary capital of Mississippi.

== Dueling incidents ==
During the summer of 1826, Mississippi Attorney General Richard Stockton, son of a signer of the Declaration of Independence, was vacationing at Columbia Springs. Among others visiting that summer were the Payson family, merchants from New Orleans. One night at a formal dinner, Stockton and Payson had a disagreement with one another. As tempers flared, both men drew pistols on one another until a bystander defused the situation. Emotions festered for several days until a challenge was made for the men to settle their differences by fighting code duello.

=== Ross and Gibbs ===
Almost simultaneously, another argument ensued between two other men at the hotel, one named Ross and the other Gibbs. These two men, one a planter and the other a Jefferson County attorney, fought a duel in 1826 near Grand Gulf, Mississippi, on the west bank of the river. Both parties selected muskets for their weapons, and at first fire, both men fell mortally wounded. One man died after only a few hours while the other lingered for months. Richard Stockton was present when the Ross/Gibbs duel was fought in the capacity of a surgeon.

=== Stockton and Payson ===
Richard Stockton and Payson met in New Orleans in early 1827 to fight their duel. Using pistols, at first fire Stockton was struck in the head by Payson's ball, and Payson left the dueling field without injury. Stockton had left a note in his pocket which stated that he felt his "own conduct had been rash and wrong from the beginning" and it was his intention upon surviving the first fire to acknowledge his error and make amends with Payson. A New Orleans newspaper published on February 4, 1827 mentions the duel between Stockton and Payson and reported of the death of Stockton. It also refers to Payson as a "Bostonian." By 1830, Payson had accidentally drowned in the Mississippi River.

In his 1876 History of Hancock County, Mississippi, congressman John Frances Hamtramck Claiborne made reference to the Stockton and Payson duel and stated that Stockton had been shot in the heart;

"Richard Stockton resided in Natchez, was from New Jersey, son of one of the signers of the Declaration of Independence, graduated at the head of his class at Princeton, began a brilliant career in Mississippi, was attorney general I believe, quarreled with a New Orleans gentleman at Stovall's Springs, in Marion County, and in the duel that followed, was shot through the heart."

== Decline ==
Although neither the Ross and Gibbs nor the Stockton and Payson duels were fought at Columbia Springs, these tragic events were rooted there and tarnished the reputation of Columbia Springs enough that it never recovered. At least one source states that the hotel closed immediately after the duels and never reopened. The ruins of the hotel and outbuildings may have still been standing by 1891 when a writer then commented; "scarcely a vestige of the hotel now remains." Eventually the main building as well as the service buildings were dismantled.

== Poetry ==
The serenity of the springs proved inspirational to those who visited and vacationed there during its prime. At least one unknown poet was inspired to pen the following epic poem while at the springs, which was first published in the Louisiana Advertiser, October 7, 1826.

Written in the port folio of a Gentleman at the Columbia Springs, of Charles Stovall esq. on Pearl river, Mississippi, in 1826.

In this retired sequestered scene,
Where Dryads sport in mantles green;
Far from the noisy maddening throng;
The minstrel wakes his sylvan song.
What chastened beauties strike the eye
As flood and field commingling lie;
And verdant groves or flowery dell,
Where peace and pleasure love to dwell?
With circling course, Pearl pours his flood,
Through sunny glades and forests rude;
While glistening with the orient day,
Around his chrystal waters play.
And thus his gentle ode has run,
Since time his annual course begun;
And thus shall pour his lucid wave
To where old Ocean's billows lave;
'Till time shall cease his swift career,
And man and being disappear;
Immersed in the unfathomed sea,
Of boundless, vast eternity.
Now on his bank, lo beauty's form.
With soul enshrined, and feelings warm,
Delights the sparkling wave to trace,
And catch each wild surrounding grace;
O'er the clear tide behold her bend;
While Naiads on her steps attend;
And in the Mirror of the stream
Sees all her blushing beauties beam;
The rosy cheek, the sparkling eye;
The lips where Loves in ambush lie;
The snow white neck, the clustering hair,
Each valued charm reflected there:
Proud she exalts with conscious power
And reigns the sovereign of the hour.
Or haply in some pensive mood,
She pauses o'er the chrystal flood.
And views its circling current sweep,
In constant journey, to the deep;
Emblem of man, whose ceaseless wave
Is rolled to that dark gulf, the grave!
When starry evening pours her ray,
And mellows all the landscape gay;
These bowers so formed by nature's care,
Receive the constant, plighted pair,
Whose hearts are one, by feeling blent;
Whose souls (entwined each ligament)
Have breathed that vow which, heard on high,
E'en angels witness in the sky:-
Elate with joy, with rapture warm,
They gather every passing charm;
And o'er the future, spread each flower
Which hope can cull from fancy's bower;
And fondly view their years bestrewed
With roseate bliss and halcyon good.
Ah! Reckless they what griefs assail,
When bleak misfortune blows her gale:-
Affections crushed by wasting Death,
The eye bedimmed, and gasped the breath;
Beauty's bright form to dust returned,
And life's fond hopes with her enurned;
A solitary mourner's tread
Is heard o'er mansions of the dead;
The sad spectator of mankind,
Who lives without one joy behind.
But see, a gayer scene inspires,
Where love illumes his brightest fires;
And keener points his polished dart,
To carry captive all the heart.
The ballroom mopes, and high the blaze
Of radiant beauty, strikes the gaze:
Soft music floats upon the air,
And woman's charms shine doubly fair;
The dancer's steps drawn cut with art,
Their gay mysterious joys impart;
And mingling in the magic maze,
Each fair her brightest power displays;-
Now treading, to melodious sounds,
The blithe cotillion's graceful rounds;
Now, in the measured contra dance,
Shoots from her eye the thrilling glance,
Or, in the reel's fantastic measures
Trips the gay paths of sprightly pleasure;
While strains enamored breathe the sigh,
That magic chord of sympathy.
No wanton waltz shall here intrude,
With manners low and action rude-
Columbia's fair detest the art,
When siren song pollutes the heart;
And wakes its wild lascivious charms
To give to vice alluring forms.
With dimpled cheek, and laughing eye,
Their brightest gem is modesty.
Such are the scenes which, here awhile,
Shed o'er my lot joy's roseate smile;
As on the banks of Pearl I stray,
And laughing pass the hours away:
Here in these cool secluded shades,
These verdant lawns and sylvan glades;
How pleasure's beams, with brightening ray,
Illumine all the live long day;
And yield each bliss, whose charms impart
Their soothing solace to the heart
Friends I have found, but late made known,
Friends whom my feelings fondly own;
Beauty's high charms, and woman's worth;
All-all have poured their brilliance forth;
And wit and talents have bestrewed
Their flowrets on my solitude.
These dreams are o'er; again my way,
Is far from Pleasure's fading ray:
The tumult of the world I seek,
Its halcyon sky, or tempest bleak;
Alike prepared with purposed mind,
Its sunshine or its storm to find.
Then farewell Pearl, and friends adieu,
My destined path is far from you:
Yet oft in memory's bright array.
Will throng the hours while here I stray;
And oft in dreams the heart shall trace,
Friendship's loved forms and Beauty's grace.
