= K. J. Cloyd =

American football player (born 2001)

Profile
- Position: Linebacker

Personal information
- Born: February 19, 2001 (age 25); Columbia, Mississippi, U.S.
- Listed height: 6 ft 2 in (1.88 m)
- Listed weight: 228 lb (103 kg)

Career information
- High school: Columbia
- College: Jones (2019); Louisville (2020–2022); Miami (2023)
- NFL draft: 2024: undrafted

Career history
- Minnesota Vikings (2024)*; New York Giants (2024)*; Denver Broncos (2024)*; New York Giants (2025)*; Ottawa Redblacks (2026)
- * Offseason or practice squad member only

Career CFL statistics as of 2026
- Total tackles: 5
- Stats at Pro Football Reference

Kevon "K. J." Cloyd (born February 19, 2001) is an American professional football linebacker. He most recently played for the Ottawa Redblacks of the Canadian Football League (CFL). He played college football for the Louisville Cardinals and Miami Hurricanes.

== Early life ==
Cloyd was born in Columbia, Mississippi to Elsie Cowart and Kevin Cloyd, both former college basketball players. He played high school football at Columbia High School. While participating in an Oklahoma drill, Cloyd severed multiple nerves in his arm. Barely avoiding amputation, Cloyd would go on to miss his entire sophomore season and four games of his junior season due to the injury. Despite this, upon graduating he played JUCO football at Jones College for a season and eventually became a three-star recruit.

== College career ==
Ahead of the 2020 college football season, Cloyd committed to Louisville. In 2020, Cloyd mostly played on special teams and recorded 12 tackles. In 2021, he made his first college start and played in all 12 games, once again making 12 tackles. In 2022, he had 15 tackles and a fumble recovery.

In 2023, heading into his senior year, Cloyd transferred to Miami. During his sole season with the Hurricanes, Cloyd played in all 12 games and started six. He had the fifth most tackles on the team at 42, while also recording 6.5 tackles-for-loss, two sacks, and a pass breakup.

== Professional career ==
Pre-draft measurables
Height	Weight	Arm length	Hand span	40-yard dash	10-yard split	20-yard split	20-yard shuttle	Three-cone drill	Vertical jump	Broad jump	Bench press
6 ft 1 3/8 in (1.86 m)	228 lb (103 kg)	31 3/8 in (0.80 m)	9 3/4 in (0.25 m)	4.75 s	1.58 s	2.66 s	4.48 s	7.08 s	34 in (0.86 m)	10 ft 4 in (3.15 m)	19 reps
All values from Pro Day

=== Minnesota Vikings ===
After going undrafted in the 2024 NFL draft, Cloyd signed with the Minnesota Vikings as an undrafted free agent. On July 25, he was waived by the Vikings.

=== New York Giants (first stint) ===
On August 11, 2024, Cloyd was signed by the New York Giants. During Week 3 of the preseason, Cloyd's performance stood out against the New York Jets. On August 28, Cloyd was released and then re-signed to the practice squad. On August 31, Cloyd was released by the Giants once again to make room on the practice squad for Gervarrius Owens.

=== Denver Broncos ===
On December 10, 2024, Cloyd signed to the Denver Broncos' practice squad. He signed a reserve/future contract with Denver on January 13, 2025. Cloyd was waived by the Broncos on May 12.

=== New York Giants (second stint) ===
On August 4, 2025, Cloyd signed with the New York Giants. He was released by the Giants on August 22.

=== Ottawa Redblacks ===
On April 14, 2026, Cloyd signed with the Ottawa Redblacks of the Canadian Football League (CFL). He was released on May 30 as part of final roster cuts. On July 10, Cloyd was re-signed to the practice roster. He played in four games, starting in one, where he had five tackles. He was released on September 7, 2026.

== Personal life ==
Cloyd has a fear of butterflies. In college, he majored in liberal arts.
