= Columbia High School (Mississippi) =

High school in Mississippi, United States

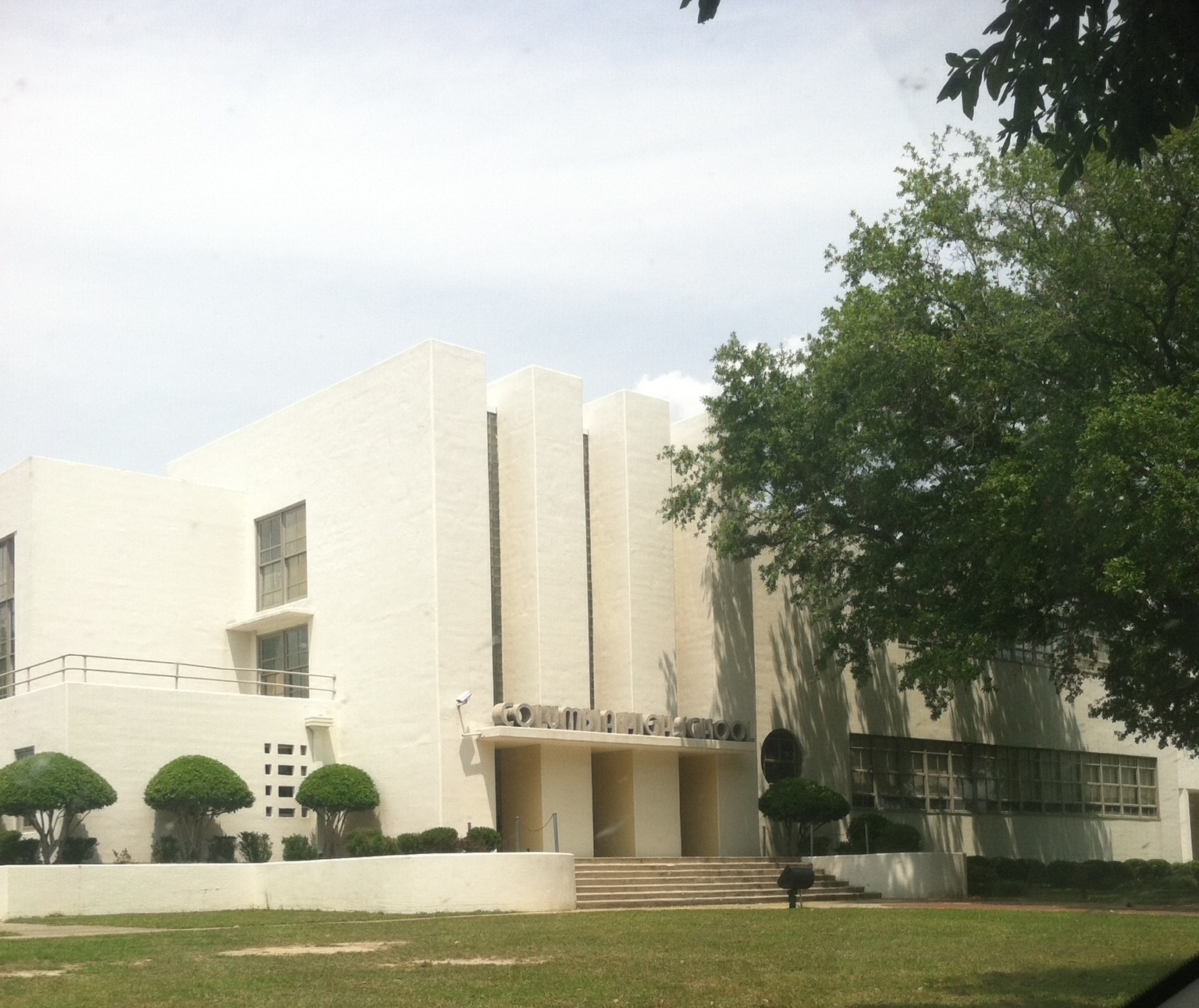

Location
- 1009 Broad St; Columbia, (Marion County), Mississippi 39429; United States; 31.2513°N 89.8197°W

Information
- School type: Secondary school
- Established: 1937
- School district: Columbia School District
- Superintendent: Jason Harris
- Principal: L.V. McNeal
- Teaching staff: 31.32 (on an FTE basis)
- Grades: 9th to 12th
- Enrollment: 471 (2023–2024)
- Student to teacher ratio: 15.04
- Colors: Blue and gold
- Mascot: Wildcat
- Website: chs.columbiaschools.org

Columbia High School is a 4A High School located in Columbia, Mississippi, United States. The principal is L.V. McNeal. It is in Columbia School District. It is a Mississippi Landmark.

The architecture of the building is an example of European-inspired modernism, and was featured in the French architectural journal l'architecture d'aujourd'hui. It was built in 1937 as a Works Progress Administration project.

In the 2021–2022 school year, the student body was 49.89 percent White and 45.37 percent African American.

== Notable alumni ==
- Kentrel Bullock, NFL running back for the Cincinnati Bengals
- K. J. Cloyd, professional football linebacker
- Ernest Duff (1931–2016), businessman, lawyer and Mormon bishop
- Gus Hunt, American cybersecurity expert, and former intelligence officer. He is the managing director and cyber strategy lead for Accenture Federal Services. He formerly served as the Chief Technology Officer for the Chief Information Officer at the Central Intelligence Agency (CIA).
- Jaheim Oatis (2022), offensive tackle for the Alabama Crimson Tide
- Walter Payton, hall of fame former Chicago Bears running back who died in 1999, and the namesake for the Walter Payton Award

== Extracurricular activities ==
=== Marching Band ===
The CHS Marching Band has won 11 MHSAA state championship titles in 2004, 2007, 2008, 2011, 2013, 2014, 2018, 2022, 2023, 2024, and 2025

== Athletics ==
=== Football ===
The CHS Football Team has won 3 MHSAA state championship titles in 1982, 2021, and 2025.

=== Baseball ===
The CHS Baseball team has won 1 MHSAA championship in 2011.
