= Ethelbert I. Singley =

American politician

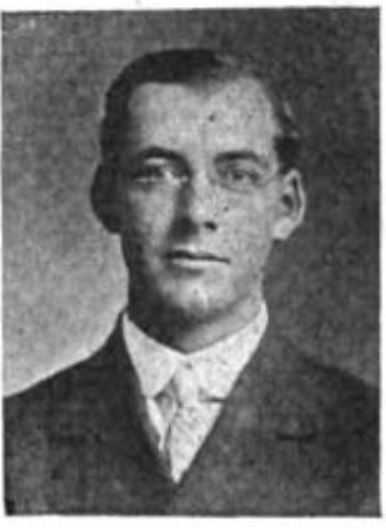
- c. 1917

Member of the Mississippi House of Representatives from the Marion County district
- In office January 1916 – January 1920

Personal details
- Born: December 2, 1888 Columbia, Mississippi
- Died: July 27, 1967 (aged 78) Columbia, Mississippi
- Resting place: Marion County, MS
- Party: Independent
- Children: 7

Ethelbert Isaac Singley (December 2, 1888 - July 27, 1967), also known as Elmer Singley, was an independent member of the Mississippi House of Representatives, representing Marion County, from 1916 to 1920.

== Biography ==
Ethelbert Isaac Singley was born near Columbia, Mississippi, on December 2, 1888. His parents were Seaborn Singley and Fannie (Lang) Singley. Ethelbert attended the rural schools of Marion County. He attended South Mississippi College and became a teacher. In November 1915, he entered politics, by running for the Mississippi House of Representatives. He was elected to represent Marion County for the 1916–1920 term, as an independent. During his term, he was the chairman of the House's Liquor Traffic committee. He was a Justice of the Peace from 1948 to 1955. He died after a three-week illness in Marion County General Hospital in Columbia, Mississippi, on July 27, 1967, and was buried northeast of Columbia.

== Personal life ==
Singley was a member of the Baptist Church. In 1912, he married Anna L. Hollaway. They had at least seven children, named Robert Luther Walter Singley, Seaborn Alex Singley, Ike Singley, Sennett Singley, and three daughters. Anna died in 1961. When Ethelbert died, he was also survived by 27 grandchildren and 28 great-grandchildren.
