= Jaheim Oatis =

American football player (born 2002)

Jeheim Oatis
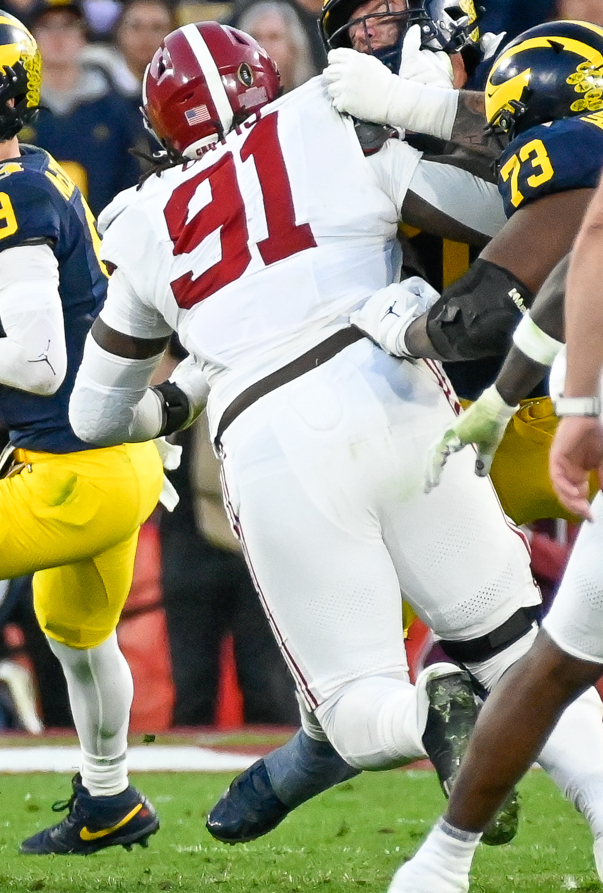

No. 9 – Ole Miss Rebels
- Position: Defensive tackle
- Class: (redshirt) Senior

Personal information
- Born: November 30, 2002 (age 23)
- Listed height: 6 ft 5 in (1.96 m)
- Listed weight: 340 lb (154 kg)

Career information
- High school: Columbia (Columbia, Mississippi)
- College: Alabama (2022–2024): Colorado (2025); Ole Miss (2026–present)
- Stats at ESPN

Jeheim Oatis (born November 30, 2002) is an American college football defensive tackle for the Ole Miss Rebels. He previously played for the Alabama Crimson Tide

== Early life ==
Otis attended Columbia High School in Columbia, Mississippi. He was selected to play in the 2022 Under Armour All-America Game. Oatis started receiving college football scholarship offers when he was in seventh grade. While in high school, he committed to the University of Alabama to play college football.

== College career ==
Oatis lost nearly 75 pounds prior to his true freshman year at Alabama in 2022. In his first year at Alabama he earned a starting job.
