= SS George Washington =

Ocean liner built in 1908 for the North German Lloyd

- George Washington in 1909, as built for Norddeutscher Lloyd

History

Germany
- Name: George Washington
- Namesake: George Washington
- Owner: Norddeutscher Lloyd
- Port of registry: Bremen
- Route: Bremen – Southampton – Cherbourg – New York
- Builder: AG Vulcan Stettin, Stettin
- Cost: US$6,000,000
- Yard number: 286
- Launched: 10 November 1908
- Sponsored by: David Jayne Hill, US Ambassador to Germany
- Maiden voyage: Bremen – Southampton – Cherbourg – New York, 12 June 1909
- Nickname(s): Called Washington by crew
- Fate: Interned, 3 August 1914; seized by US, 6 April 1917

United States
- Name: USS George Washington
- Operator: US Navy
- Acquired: 6 April 1917
- Commissioned: 6 September 1917
- Decommissioned: 28 November 1919
- Fate: Transferred to US Shipping Board

United States
- Name: George Washington
- Owner: United States Shipping Board
- Operator: 1921: United States Mail Steamship Line; 1921–1931: United States Lines
- Port of registry: New York
- Fate: Laid up, 1931

United States
- Name: USS Catlin
- Namesake: Albertus W. Catlin
- Operator: US Navy
- Commissioned: 13 March 1941
- Decommissioned: 26 September 1941
- Identification: Hull number: AP-19
- Fate: Lend-lease to United Kingdom for one voyage; to United States Army

United States
- Name: USAT George Washington
- Operator: US Army
- In service: 17 April 1943
- Out of service: 21 April 1947
- Fate: Laid up 1947; sold for scrap, 13 February 1951

General characteristics (as built)
- Type: Ocean liner
- Tonnage: 25,570 GRT
- Length: 213.07 m (699 ft 1 in) (between perpendiculars)
- Beam: 23.83 m (78 ft 2 in)
- Draft: 33 ft (10 m)
- Depth: 54 ft (16 m) (from upper saloon deck); 80 ft (24 m) (from awning deck)
- Propulsion: twin quadruple-expansion engines with coal-fired boilers; twin screws
- Speed: 18 to 19 knots (33 to 35 km/h; 21 to 22 mph)
- Capacity: Passengers: 520 first class; 377 second class; 2,000 third class
- Notes: two funnels, four masts

General characteristics (as USS George Washington)
- Type: transport
- Displacement: 33,000 t
- Length: 722 ft 5 in (220.19 m) (overall)
- Beam: 78 ft (24 m)
- Draft: 36 ft (11 m)
- Propulsion: coal fired later converted to oil fired boilers, steam turbine
- Speed: 19 knots (35 km/h; 22 mph)
- Complement: 749
- Armament: World War II: 4 × single 5"/38 caliber gun gun mounts; 4 × single 3"/50 caliber gun gun mounts; 8 × .50-caliber machine guns

SS George Washington was an ocean liner built in 1908 for the Bremen-based North German Lloyd and was named after George Washington, the first President of the United States. The ship was also known as USS George Washington (ID-3018) and USAT George Washington in service of the United States Navy and United States Army, respectively, in World War I. In the interwar period, she reverted to her original name of George Washington. During World War II, the ship was known as both USAT George Washington and, briefly, as USS Catlin (AP-19), in a short, second stint in the US Navy.

When George Washington was launched in 1908, she was the largest German-built steamship and the third-largest ship in the world. George Washington was built to emphasize comfort over speed and was sumptuously appointed in her first-class passenger areas. The ship could carry a total of 2,900 passengers, and made her maiden voyage in January 1909 to New York. In June 1911, George Washington was the largest ship to participate in the Coronation Fleet Review by the United Kingdom's newly crowned king, George V.

On 14 April 1912, George Washington passed a particularly large iceberg south of the Grand Banks of Newfoundland and radioed a warning to all ships in the area, including White Star Line ocean liner Titanic, which sank near the same location. Throughout her German passenger career, contemporary news accounts often reported on notable persons—typically actors, singers, and politicians—who sailed on George Washington.

At the outbreak of World War I, George Washington was interned by the then-neutral United States, until that country entered into the conflict in April 1917. George Washington was seized by the United States and taken over for use as a troop transport by the US Navy. Commissioned as USS George Washington (ID-3018), she sailed with her first load of American troops in December 1917.

In total, she carried 48,000 passengers to France, and returned 34,000 to the United States after the Armistice. George Washington also carried US President Woodrow Wilson to France twice for the Paris Peace Conference. George Washington was decommissioned in 1920 and handed over the United States Shipping Board (USSB), who reconditioned her for passenger service. George Washington sailed in transatlantic passenger service for both the United States Mail Steamship Company (one voyage) and United States Lines for ten years, before she was laid up in the Patuxent River in Maryland in 1931.

During World War II, the ship was re-commissioned by the US Navy as USS Catlin (AP-19) for about six months and was operated by the British under Lend-Lease, but her old coal-fired engines were too slow for effective combat use. After her boilers were converted to oil fuel, the ship was chartered to the US Army as USAT George Washington and sailed around the world in 1943 in trooping duties. The ship sailed in regular service to the United Kingdom and the Mediterranean from 1944 to 1947, and was laid up in Baltimore after ending her Army service. A fire in January 1951 damaged the ship severely, and she was sold for scrapping the following month.

== Design and construction ==
The George Washington under construction at AG Vulcan Stettin.

George Washington was an ocean liner built within two years (1907–1908) by AG Vulcan of Stettin, Germany (now Szczecin, Poland), for North German Lloyd (German: Norddeutscher Lloyd or NDL). Intended for Bremen – New York passenger service, the ship was named after George Washington, the first President of the United States as a way to make the ship more appealing to immigrants, who then made up the majority of transatlantic passengers and believed formalities on arrival would be easier on a ship with an American name. George Washington was launched on 10 November 1908 by the United States Ambassador to Germany, David Jayne Hill. (Note: The launching was originally scheduled for 31 October 1908, but was postponed due to low water in the Oder River. See: Drechsel, p. 374.) At the time of her launch, she was the third-largest ocean liner in the world, behind only Cunard Line ships Lusitania and Mauretania. George Washington also became the largest German-built steamship, surpassing the Hamburg America Line's Kaiserin Auguste Victoria, and held that distinction until the 1913 launch of Hamburg America's Vaterland.

After George Washington was completed, she was reported in contemporary news accounts as being 27,000 gross register tons (GRT), though present-day sources agree on a figure of 25,570 GRT. Her displacement was reported as being approximately 37,000 long tons (38,000 t), more than twice the 18420 t displacement of the British battleship Dreadnought. She was powered by two quadruple-expansion steam engines that generated 20,000 horsepower (15,000 kW) and propelled her considerably faster than the 18.5 knots (34.3 km/h) guaranteed by her builders. Because she was designed to emphasize comfort over speed, George Washington's engines consumed an economical 350 long tons (360 t) of coal daily, or about one-third as much as the Cunard speedsters Lusitania and Mauretania. By using less coal, and, consequently, needing less space to carry it, the liner was able to carry up to 13,000 long tons (13,000 t) of cargo. The liner also featured the Stone-Lloyd system of hydraulically operated bulkhead doors for her thirteen watertight compartments.

The George Washington upon being launched in 1908.

George Washington had accommodations for nearly 2,900 passengers, with 900 divided between first and second class and the balance as third class or steerage. The ship had only eight decks rather than a more typical nine, which gave her passenger accommodations a spacious feel. The first-class passenger section included 31 cabins with attached baths, and the liner's imperial suites were designed by German architect Rudolf Alexander Schröder. The second-class, third-class, and steerage compartments were fitted out in a "comfortable manner" suitable for each class.

The first class public rooms were "sumptuously appointed", and included murals by German fresco artist Otto Bollhagen that commemorated the life and times of George Washington. First-class passengers could visit a separate lounge, a reading room decorated by Bruno Paul, a two-story smoking room, and their own dining room that spanned the width of the ship. The upper and lower floors of the smoking room were joined by a broad staircase which helped, according to a report in The New York Times, make it "one of the most attractive parts" of the first-class areas. The dining saloon seated 350 diners at small tables designed for between two and six diners in "roomy and moveable" red Morocco chairs. The dining room was decorated in white and gold, with a gilded dome rising above, while its walls featured floral designs executed against a blue background.

Other first-class passenger amenities aboard George Washington included a gymnasium with machines for "Swedish exercises", and two electric elevators for those who did not want to exercise at all. There was also a darkroom open to amateur photographers; 20 dog kennels, along with a kennel master; a 70-by-50-foot (21 by 15 m) solarium decorated with green and gold tapestry, palms, and flowers of all kinds; and an open air cafe on the awning deck for taking after-dinner coffee. Second-class passengers had a separate dining room, a drawing room, and a smoking room, and third-class passengers had similar amenities.

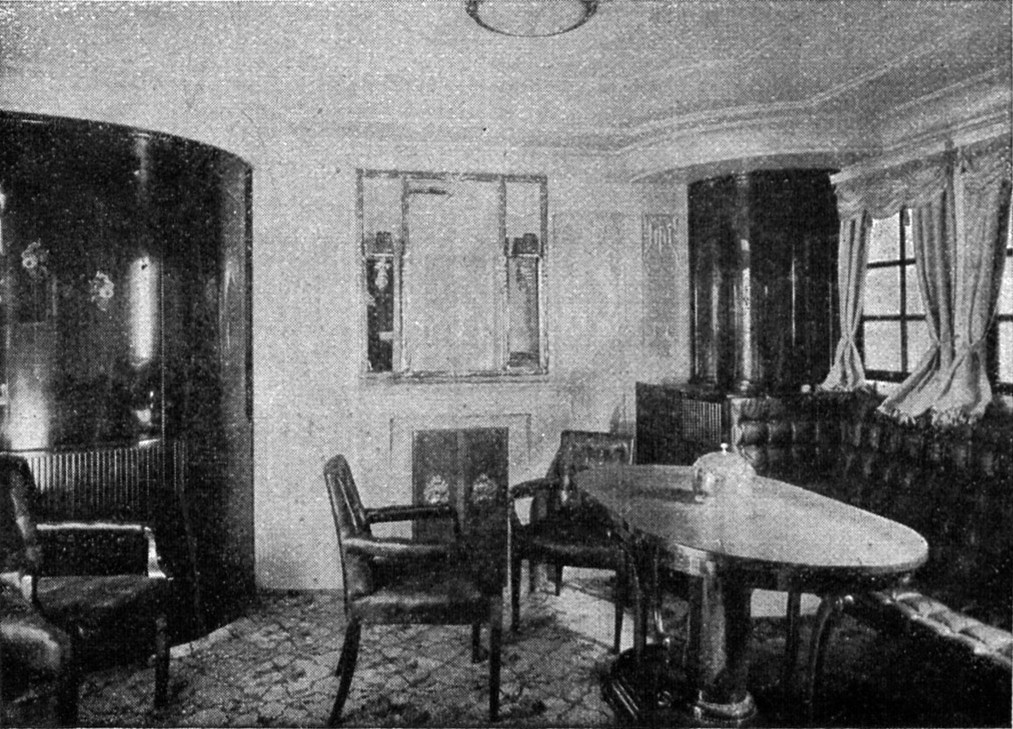
1st Class cabin, 1909

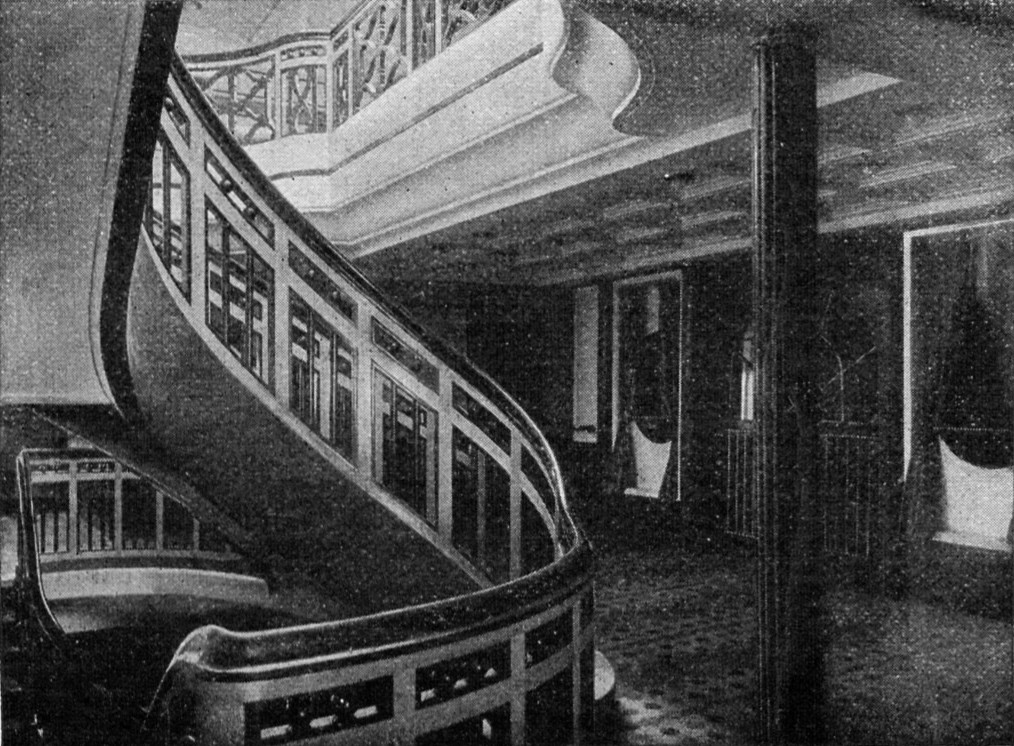
Staircase, 1909

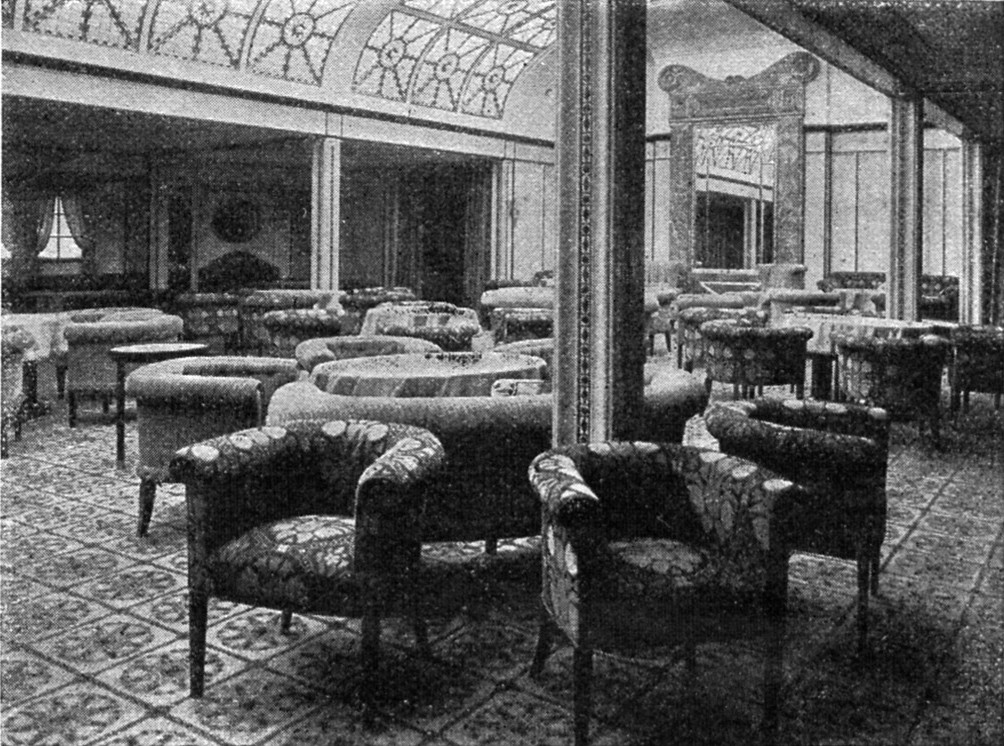
Wintergarden and Saloon, 1909

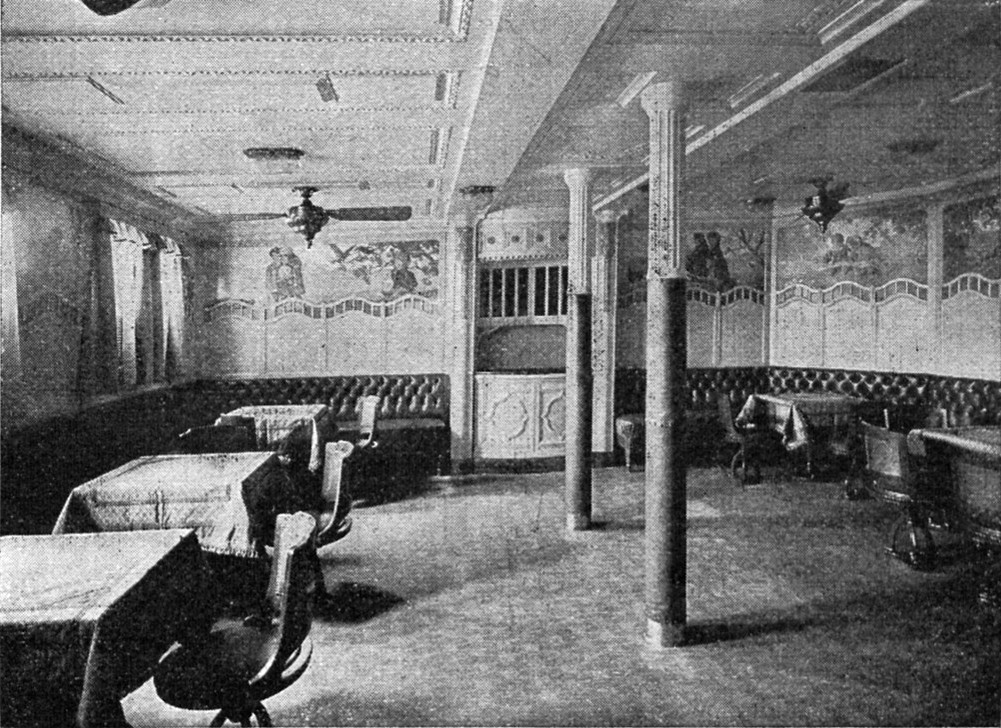
Children's playroom, 1909

== North German Lloyd passenger service ==
George Washington began her maiden voyage on 12 June 1909, sailing from Bremen to New York via Southampton and Cherbourg. On board were 1,169 passengers which included a German press contingent; Philipp Heineken, the Generaldirektor of North German Lloyd; and a chimpanzee named Consul, billed as "his Darwinian Highness", the "Almost Monkey-Man", who was coming to America under contract for the William Morris Vaudeville circuit.

Upon her arrival in New York on 20 June, George Washington was greeted by the unfurling of the official banner of the League of Peace from the Singer Building, (Note: The Singer Building, then the world's tallest building at 612 feet (187 m), was 110 feet (34 m) shorter than George Washington was long. See: "Singer Building". Emporis. Archived from the original on 2 June 2004.) and docked at 18:30 at the North German Lloyd piers in Hoboken, New Jersey. Coincidentally, Martha Washington, an ocean liner of the unrelated Austro-American Line, was in port when George Washington docked in New York for the first time.

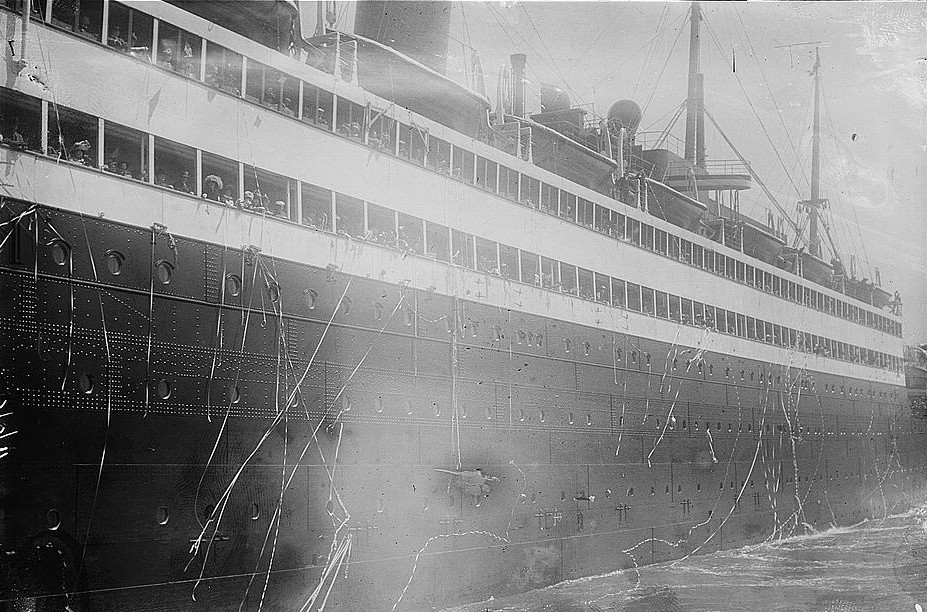
George Washington departs from New York City c. 1910, as confetti is thrown from her decks.

On 22 June, the liner hosted a press luncheon, and, the next afternoon, hosted some 3,000 members of the Daughters of the American Revolution who presented a commemorative bronze tablet. Stewart L. Woodford, a former Congressman and ambassador, spoke at the ceremony dedicating the tablet, which was placed at the base of the staircase in the first-class smoking room. Beginning 24 June, the North German Lloyd opened George Washington to the public for five days of viewing of the new ship.

Sailing on her first eastbound journey on 1 July, George Washington commenced regular service between Bremen and New York with intermediate stops in Southampton and Cherbourg. North German Lloyd considered the Washington, as her crew affectionately called her, such a success that they soon ordered another liner of similar, but slightly larger, size. (Note: The new ship, SS Columbus, was launched in 1913 and scheduled for her maiden voyage on 11 August 1914. The outbreak of the war cancelled her completion and the ship never sailed in passenger service for North German Lloyd. She was awarded to the United Kingdom as a war reparation and was renamed Homeric and sailed for the White Star Line. See: Drechsel, p. 433.)

On 24 June 1911, George Washington participated in the Coronation Fleet Review by the United Kingdom's newly crowned king, George V. Stationed at the head of the second row of merchant ships, George Washington full dressed for the occasion—was reported by The Times as "by far the largest ship present".

While headed to New York on the morning of 14 April 1912, crew aboard George Washington observed a large iceberg as the ship passed south of the Grand Banks of Newfoundland. By noon the ship passed within a half-mile (900 m) of the iceberg, estimated by the crew at 112 feet (34 m) above the waterline and 410 feet (120 m) long. After recording the ship's position, George Washington radioed a warning to all ships in the area. The White Star steamship Titanic, some 250 nautical miles (460 km) east of George Washington's position, acknowledged receipt of the warning, one of several her radio operators received. On 15 April, George Washington received garbled transmissions that informed that Titanic had struck an iceberg less than twelve hours later, and in nearly the same position as the one that George Washington had reported. Edwin Drechsel, in his two-volume chronicle of North German Lloyd, draws comparisons between the iceberg photographed by George Washington (and first published in his book), (Note: Drechsel's father, Willy Drechsel, was the Second Officer on George Washington in April 1912.) and a better-known photo taken from the Hamburg America Line ship Prinz Adalbert, purportedly of the Titanic iceberg. Drechsel suggests that the iceberg photographed and reported by George Washington may have been one and the same.

=== Notable passengers ===
Throughout her Lloyd transatlantic career George Washington carried notable passengers to and from Europe. In August 1909 Sigmund Freud sailed from Bremen bound for New York on his one and only trip to the US. He was accompanied by his colleagues Carl Jung and Sándor Ferenczi. In February 1910, banker Edgar Speyer, a Privy Counsellor appointed by Edward VII of the United Kingdom, arrived for a visit to the United States. Prince Tsai Tao, the uncle of the Emperor of China, departed in one of George Washington's imperial suites after a four-day visit to New York in May; the Chinese Imperial flag flew from the mainmast in his honor as the ship departed. In October, Henry W. Taft, brother of US President William Howard Taft returned from a visit to Europe. In December, disgraced Arctic explorer Frederick Cook arrived on the liner; conflicting opinions on the veracity of his claims of reaching the North Pole nearly caused a fight to erupt on board. On the same voyage as Cook, German actor Ernst von Possart arrived for his first stage performances in New York in over 20 years.

Composer Engelbert Humperdinck, after attending the debut of his opera Königskinder at the Metropolitan Opera, sailed on George Washington in early January 1911 in order to attend the opera's Berlin premiere. US sculptor George Grey Barnard returned to New York in April amidst controversy over some of his works. An organization called the National Society for Protection of Morals was protesting the presence of nude figures in sculptures he executed for the Pennsylvania State Capitol in Harrisburg. July saw George Washington transporting a menagerie of sorts. The liner was carrying a shipment from India of 6 white peacocks, 2 lions, 2 elephants, 150 monkeys, and some 2,000 canaries destined for the recently organized Saint Louis Zoological Park. In August, two men of note—both headed for Berlin—sailed on George Washington. Nathan Straus, co-owner with his brother Isidor of R.H. Macy & Company, sailed as the US delegate to the third world congress for the protection of infants held in Berlin. Congressman Richard Bartholdt, charged by President Taft to deliver a statue of Friedrich Wilhelm von Steuben to the German government, sailed with the statue, which was a gift from the American people.

Financier and philanthropist J. P. Morgan, Jr. returned from a two-month trip to Europe in November 1912; his wife followed him home the next month. Also arriving on George Washington's November crossing was Mary Garden, a Scottish-born soprano, who was returning from a sabbatical in Scotland. The next month, opera singers Frieda Hempel and Leon Rains, both headed for appearances with the Metropolitan Opera, arrived on the same voyage as Mrs. Morgan. Hempel, a German soprano, was with the Berlin Royal Opera, and American tenor Rains was with the Saxon Royal Opera of Dresden.

Newlyweds Francis B. Sayre, an assistant district attorney in New York, and Jessie Woodrow Wilson Sayre, the daughter of US President Woodrow Wilson, sailed in November 1913 for a European honeymoon. The couple, wed at the White House, traveled in one of George Washington's imperial suites. The following January, English playwright W. Somerset Maugham quietly slipped out of New York on George Washington. Maugham had arrived in New York in mid November to see Billie Burke in the New York premiere of his play, The Land of Promise.

Socialite and philanthropist Sarah Polk Fall, left for a six-month tour of Europe in August 1923. She was traveling First Class to England. Her daughter Saidee Grant and her husband New York Banker Rollin Grant, along with their servants accompanied her for the journey. They returned to New York in February 1924.

== World War I ==
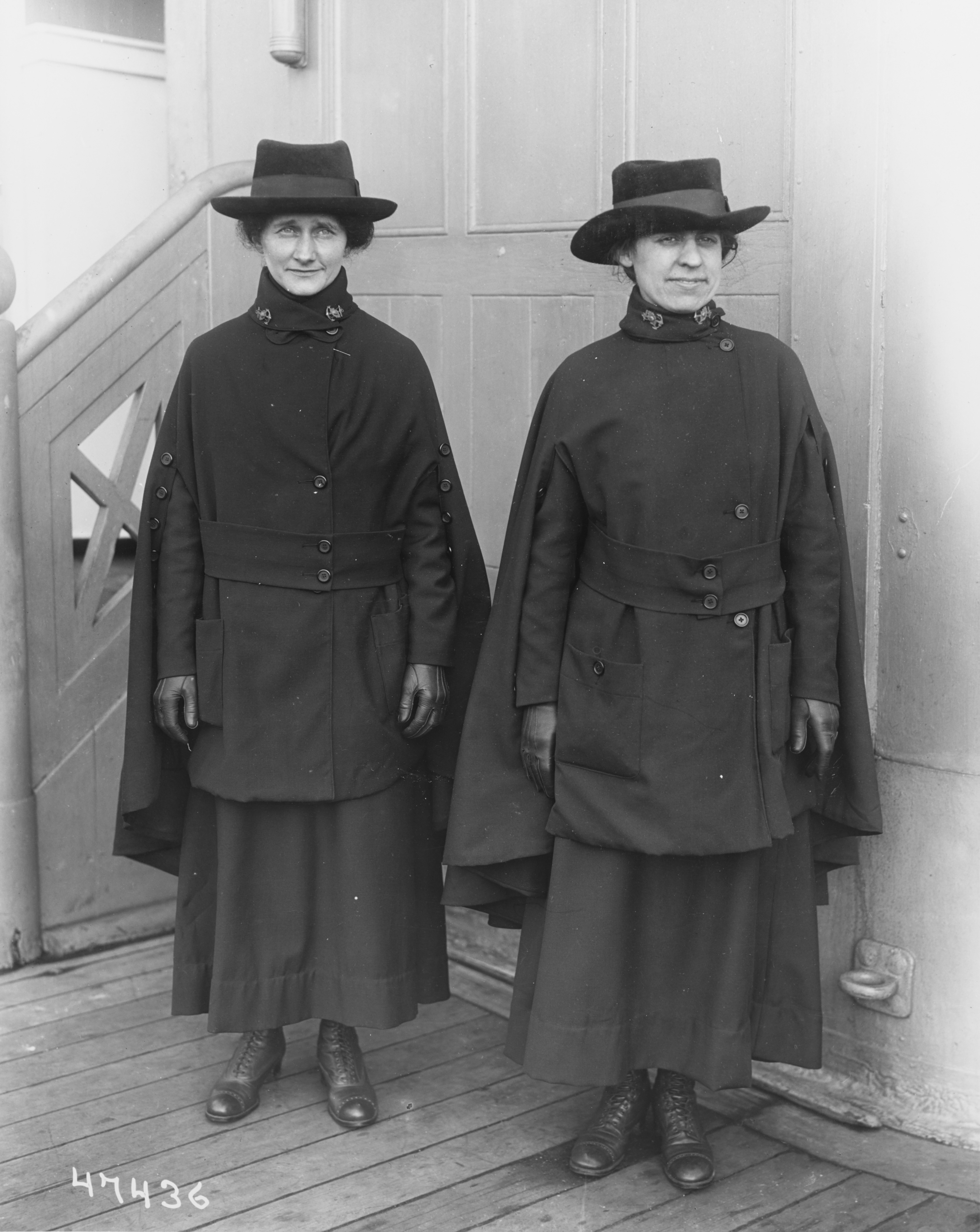
US Navy nurses crossing the Atlantic, December 1918

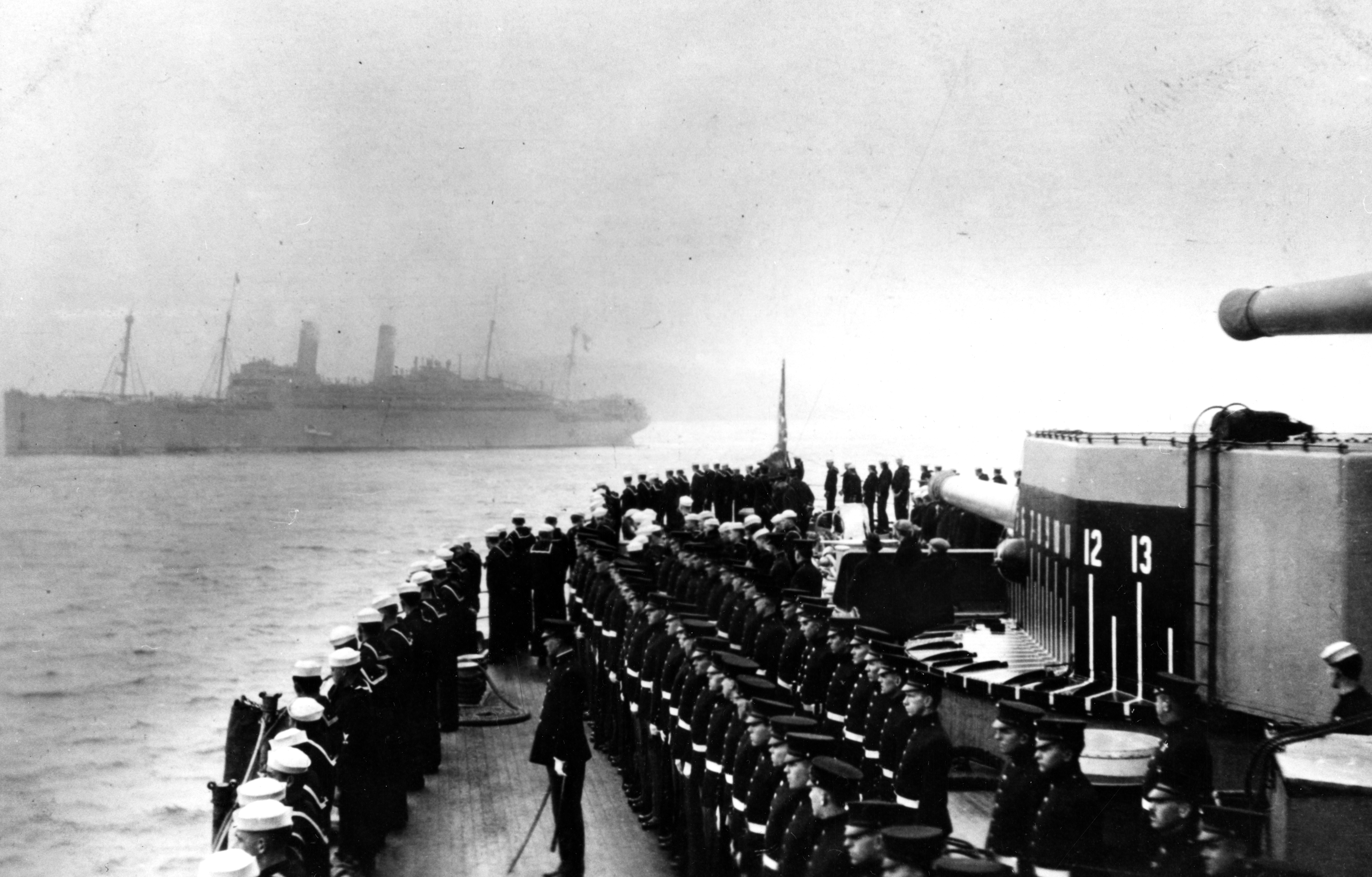
USS George Washington entering Brest harbor with President Wilson on board, 13 December 1918. Taken from USS Florida, with the crew manning the rails.

George Washington continued operating on the Bremen – New York route until World War I when she sought refuge in New York, a neutral port in 1914. With the American entry into the war in 1917, George Washington was taken over 6 April and towed to the New York Navy Yard for conversion into a transport. She commissioned 6 September 1917.

George Washington sailed with her first load of troops 4 December 1917 and during the next 2 years made 18 round trip voyages in support of the American Expeditionary Forces. During this period she also made several special voyages. President Woodrow Wilson and the American representatives to the Paris Peace Conference sailed for Europe in George Washington 4 December 1918. On this crossing she was protected by Pennsylvania, and was escorted into Brest, France, 13 December by ten battleships and twenty-eight destroyers in an impressive demonstration of American naval strength. After carrying 4000 soldiers back home to the US, George Washington carried Assistant Secretary of the Navy Franklin Roosevelt and the Chinese and Mexican peace commissions to France in January 1919. On 24 February, she returned President Wilson to the United States.

The President again embarked on board George Washington in March 1919; arriving France 13 March, and returned at the conclusion of the historic conference 8 July 1919. During this voyage, the ship carried radiotelephone equipment, then a new technology, and during much of the trip Wilson was able to converse with officials back in Washington. The radio transmitter was also used to broadcast entertainment to the troops, and it was planned to broadcast Wilson's 4 July Independence Day speech to accompanying vessels, which would have been the first radio address by a US president. However, Wilson stood too far from the microphone, and the technicians were too intimidated to try to get him to stand in the correct spot.

During the fall of 1919, George Washington carried another group of distinguished passengers—King Albert and Queen Elizabeth of Belgium and their party. Arriving New York 2 October, the royal couple paid a visit before returning to Brest 12 November. Subsequently, the ship was decommissioned 28 November 1919 after having transported some 48,000 passengers to Europe and 34,000 back to the United States. The ship was turned over to the United States Shipping Board on 28 January 1920.

=== The Hatchet newspaper ===
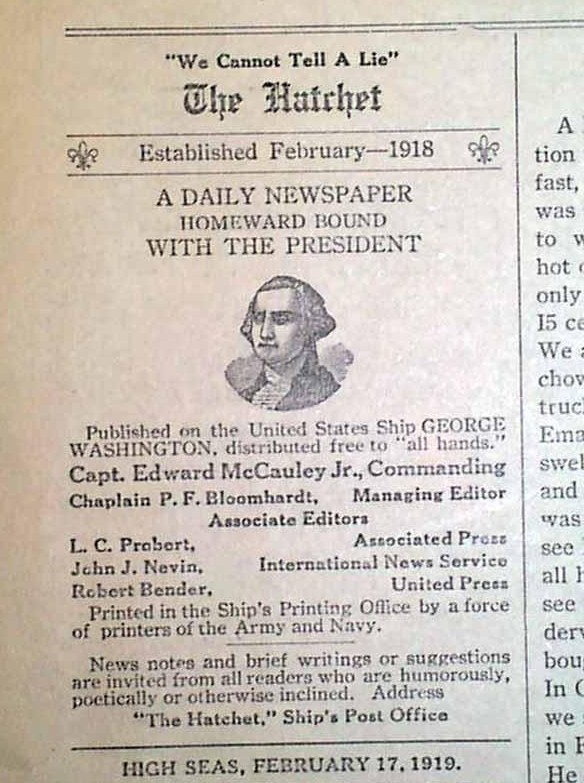
The masthead of The Hatchet from February 1919, showing the newspaper writers involved.

Started in February 1918; as a means to relieve the stress the troops, sailors, and officers were under aboard a ship in the danger zone; it was written by officers who had previous literary experience and produced by men who had printing and publishing experience. It was printed on a small hand press – 5,000 copies with the first issue but this was increased to 7,000 – and titled The Hatchet (a reference to the tale about George Washington and the cherry tree). News from the ship and news received by radio were in the single-sheet newspaper. The masthead in 1919 listed the ship chaplain as managing editor and three reporters—one each from the Associated Press, International News Service and the United Press as "associate editors". The newspaper pages, printed on a shipboard press, measured about 9 by 8 inches (23 by 20 cm). The newspaper's motto: "We Cannot Tell a Lie". Its front page claimed it had "The Largest Circulation on the Atlantic Ocean".

== Interwar passenger service ==
After her delivery to the United States Shipping Board (USSB), George Washington was used to transport 250 members of the American Legion to France as guests of the French Government in 1921. The ship was then reconditioned by the USSB for transatlantic service, and chartered by the U.S. Mail Steamship Company, for whom she made one voyage to Europe in March 1921. The company was taken over by the government August 1921 and its name changed to the United States Lines. In 1930, she transported the first group of American Gold Star Mothers to France to visit the graves of their sons. George Washington served the Line on the transatlantic route until 1931 when she was laid up in the Patuxent River, Maryland.

== World War II ==
George Washington was reacquired for Navy use from the United States Maritime Commission on 28 January 1941 and commissioned as USS Catlin (AP-19) on 13 March 1941. She was named in honor of Brigadier General Albertus W. Catlin, USMC. It was found, however, that the coal-burning engines did not give the required speed for protection against submarines, and she was decommissioned on 26 September 1941. Because of their great need for ships in 1941, Great Britain took the ship over under Lend-Lease on 29 September 1941 as George Washington, but they found after one voyage to Newfoundland that her aging boilers could not safely maintain sufficient steam pressure to drive her otherwise serviceable engines. A secondary contributing factor was the difficulty in manning her with sufficient skilled stokers – the role having been supplanted with the steady introduction of oil fired ships in the 1930s. With the ship unfit for combat service the British returned her to the War Shipping Administration (WSA) on 17 April 1942.

The ship was next operated under General Agency Agreement by the Waterman Steamship Co., Mobile, Alabama, and made a voyage to Panama. After her return on 5 September 1942 the WSA assigned George Washington to be converted to an oil-burner at Todd Shipbuilding's Brooklyn Yard. When she emerged on 17 April 1943, the transport was bareboat chartered by the United States Army and made a voyage to Casablanca and back to New York with troops between April and May 1943. (Note: A coastal transport, George Washington built 1924 5,284 GRT, was WSA operated from East Coast ports to the islands of the Caribbean. That ship was dubbed little George Washington.)

In July, George Washington sailed from New York to the Panama Canal, thence to Los Angeles and Brisbane, Australia. Returning to Los Angeles, she sailed again in September to Bombay and Cape Town, and arrived at New York to complete her round-the-world voyage in December 1943. In January 1944 George Washington began regular service to the United Kingdom and the Mediterranean, again carrying troops in support of the Allies in Europe. She made frequent stops at Le Havre, Southampton, and Liverpool.

George Washington was taken out of service and returned to the Maritime Commission 21 April 1947. She remained tied to a pier at Baltimore, until a fire damaged her 16 January 1951. She was subsequently sold for scrap to the Boston Metals Corporation of Baltimore on 13 February 1951.

== Awards ==
- World War I Victory Medal
- American Defense Service Medal
- Asiatic-Pacific Campaign Medal
- European-African-Middle Eastern Campaign Medal
- World War II Victory Medal
- Army of Occupation Medal with "Germany" clasp

== Bibliography ==
- Bonsor, N. R. P. (1978) [1955]. North Atlantic Seaway. Vol. 2 (Enlarged and completely revised ed.). Saint Brélade, Jersey: Brookside Publications. ISBN 0-905824-01-6. OCLC 29930159.
- Drechsel, Edwin (1994). Norddeutscher Lloyd, Bremen, 1857–1970: History, Fleet, Ship Mails. Vol. 1. Vancouver, BC: Cordillera Pub. Co. ISBN 978-1-895590-08-1. OCLC 30357825.
- Naval Historical Center. "George Washington". Dictionary of American Naval Fighting Ships. Navy Department, Naval History and Heritage Command.
- 70 Years North German Lloyd Bremen, 1857–1927. Berlin: Atlantic-Verlag. 1927. OCLC 6333314.
- Putnam, William Lowell (2001). The Kaiser's Merchant Ships in World War I. Jefferson, North Carolina: McFarland. ISBN 978-0-7864-0923-5. OCLC 46732396.
