= Hub, Mississippi =

- Unincorporated community
- Location within Mississippi Location within the United States
- Coordinates: 31°8′44″N 89°45′00″W
- Country: United States
- State: Mississippi
- County: Marion
- Elevation: 144 ft (44 m)
- Time zone: UTC-6 (Central (CST))
  - Summer (DST): UTC-5 (CDT)
- GNIS feature ID: 691947

Hub is an unincorporated community in Marion County, Mississippi, United States.

South of Hub is the Lower Little Creek, a tributary of the Pearl River.

Hub was never incorporated, and had a post office from 1899 to 1954.

A shortline logging railroad, constructed by Camp & Hinton Brothers in the 1880s, began in Hub and extended several miles south. The Gulf and Ship Island Railroad, a mainline railroad, was built through Hub in 1899.

Hub once had two operating sawmills and had a population of 25 in 1900.

In 1945, Humble Oil discovered the Hub Field. It eventually produced 350 billion cubic feet of natural gas and eight million barrels of oil. The California Oil Company and the Pan American Petroleum Corporation also operated wells in the Hub Field.
