= Benjamin Lee (general) =

Benjamin Lee (1774 – December 27, 1828) was an American military leader and political figure. He was born in Robeson County, North Carolina in 1774 to Jesse Lee Sr., a soldier who served in the North Carolina State Militia during the American Revolution. In 1802 and 1803, Benjamin Lee served as the representative of Robeson County in the lower House of the North Carolina General Assembly and from 1804 to 1810 he was the senator for Robeson County.

== Life ==
In 1807 Lee was commissioned as the Brigadier General of the 14th Brigade of the North Carolina State Militia, a post he still held as late as 1812.

Lee moved to Marion County, Mississippi, where his family was living at the time. In 1818, he served as a Justice of the Marion County Orphans Court and from 1819 to 1820 he served as the Chief Justice.

In 1825, Lee bought 600 acres from John Lott Sr. for $2,000, located in Columbia, Mississippi from 2nd Street to behind the Marion County courthouse.

Lee died two days after Christmas on December 27, 1828. He was buried in Old Columbia City Cemetery, in Columbia, Mississippi.
