= Carey B. Maddox-Preston =

American social worker

- Maddox-Preston, c. 1965
- Born: Carey Belle Maddox; April 28, 1915; Columbia, Mississippi
- Died: December 1, 2000 (aged 85); Burbank, Illinois
- Occupations: Executive director, Alpha Kappa Alpha

Carey Belle Maddox-Preston (April 28, 1915 – December 1, 2000) was an American social worker. From 1949 to 1974, she was the first executive director of Alpha Kappa Alpha sorority. She was also president of the board of directors of the Chicago Urban League, from 1970 to 1973, and an appointed member of the Chicago Board of Education from 1968 to 1980.

== Early life and education ==
Maddox was born in Columbia, Mississippi, the daughter of Richard M. Maddox and Mattie Hendricks Maddox. Both of her parents were also born in Mississippi; her father was a fireman on the railroad. She graduated from Tougaloo College and earned a master's degree in social work from Atlanta School of Social Work. She was a member of Alpha Kappa Alpha.

== Career ==
Maddox-Preston worked at the National Training School in Washington, D.C. as a young woman. She was executive director of Alpha Kappa Alpha from 1949 to 1974. She led the organization's purchase of its national headquarters in Chicago, known as the "Ivy Center", and then oversaw the headquarters' expansion. She was also president of the board of directors of the Chicago Urban League from 1970 to 1973. She was nominated for an appointment on the Chicago Board of Education in 1965, and served on the school board from 1968 to 1980. During her time on the school board, her simultaneous leadership role in the Urban League was questioned as a possible conflict of interest. She supported a controversial plan to desegregate the schools by reassigning teachers and principals. "I"m willing to go through the upheaval because I think in the long run the greater lesson is one not taught in the textbook," she said. "That lesson is that all people have to live and work together."

== Personal life ==
Carey Maddox married John W. Preston; he died in 1971. Maddox-Preston died in 2000, at the age of 85, at a nursing home in Burbank, Illinois. A resolution in the Illinois House of Representatives paid tribute to Maddox-Preston soon after she died.
