= Attorney General Lee =

Attorney General Lee may refer to:

- Charles Lee (Attorney General) (1758–1815), Attorney General of the United States
- Howard B. Lee (1879–1985), Attorney General of West Virginia
- John Lee (Attorney-General) (1733–1793), Attorney General for England and Wales
- N. Warner Lee (born 1937), Attorney General of Arizona

== See also ==
- General Lee (disambiguation)
