= Albertus W. Catlin =

United States Marine Corps general (1868–1931)

Albertus Wright Catlin
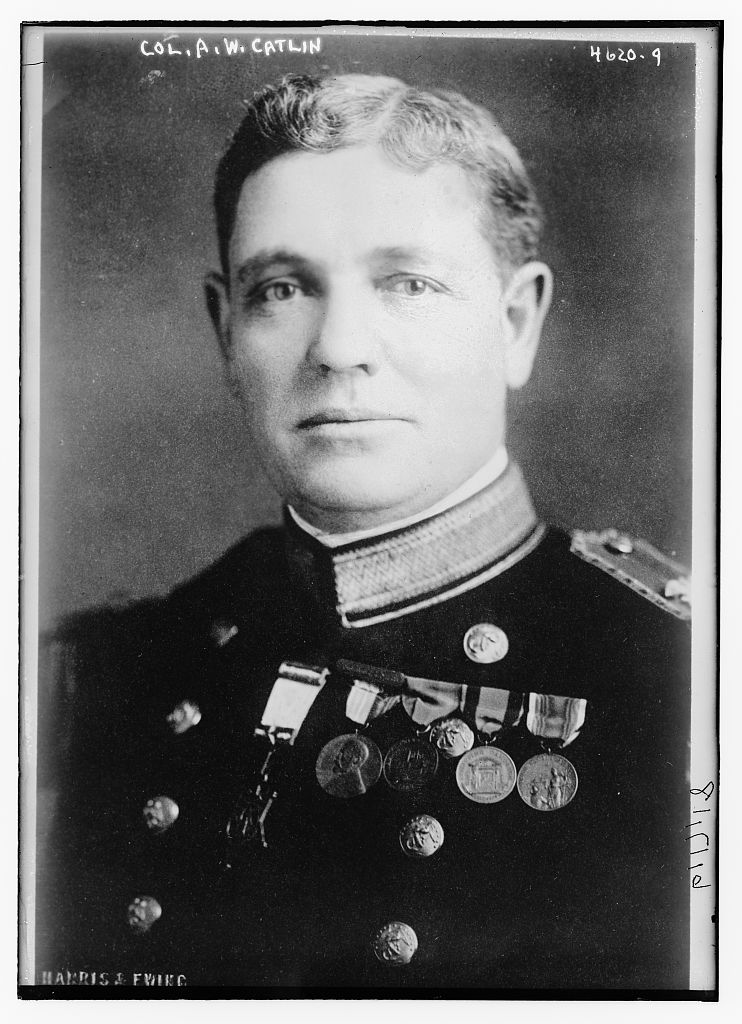
- Brigadier General Albertus W. Catlin
- Born: December 1, 1868; Gowanda, New York, US
- Died: May 31, 1933 (aged 64); Culpeper, Virginia, US
- Burial place: Arlington National Cemetery
- Military career
- Allegiance: United States
- Branch: United States Navy; United States Marine Corps
- Service years: 1886–1892 (Navy); 1892–1919 (Marine Corps)
- Rank: Brigadier General
- Commands: 3rd Marine Regiment; Marine Corps Base Quantico; 6th Marine Regiment
- Conflicts: Spanish–American War; Occupation of Veracruz; World War I: Battle of Belleau Wood; Banana Wars: Occupation of Haiti
- Awards: Medal of Honor; Legion of Honour; Croix de Guerre (2)

Brigadier General Albertus Wright Catlin (December 1, 1868 – May 31, 1933) was a United States Marine Corps general. He also was a recipient of the Medal of Honor for his services during the Occupation of Veracruz in 1914.

== Biography ==
=== Early career ===
Born December 1, 1868, in Gowanda, New York, Catlin was appointed to the U.S. Naval Academy from Minnesota in May 1886. He captained the football team at Annapolis and played left halfback for three years. After graduating with the Class of 1890, he served on board USS Charleston for required two years sea duty as a midshipman.

The Marines seemed to offer the best chance for active service, so Catlin applied for and was commissioned a second lieutenant in the Marine Corps on July 1, 1892. In September 1892 he reported for duty at the Marine Corps School of Application and graduated first in his class in April 1893. In April 1893, Catlin was promoted to first lieutenant and transferred that December to Marine Barracks, League Island, Philadelphia Navy Yard, Pennsylvania. Returning to sea in August 1895, he reported to USS Cincinnati.

=== Spanish–American War ===
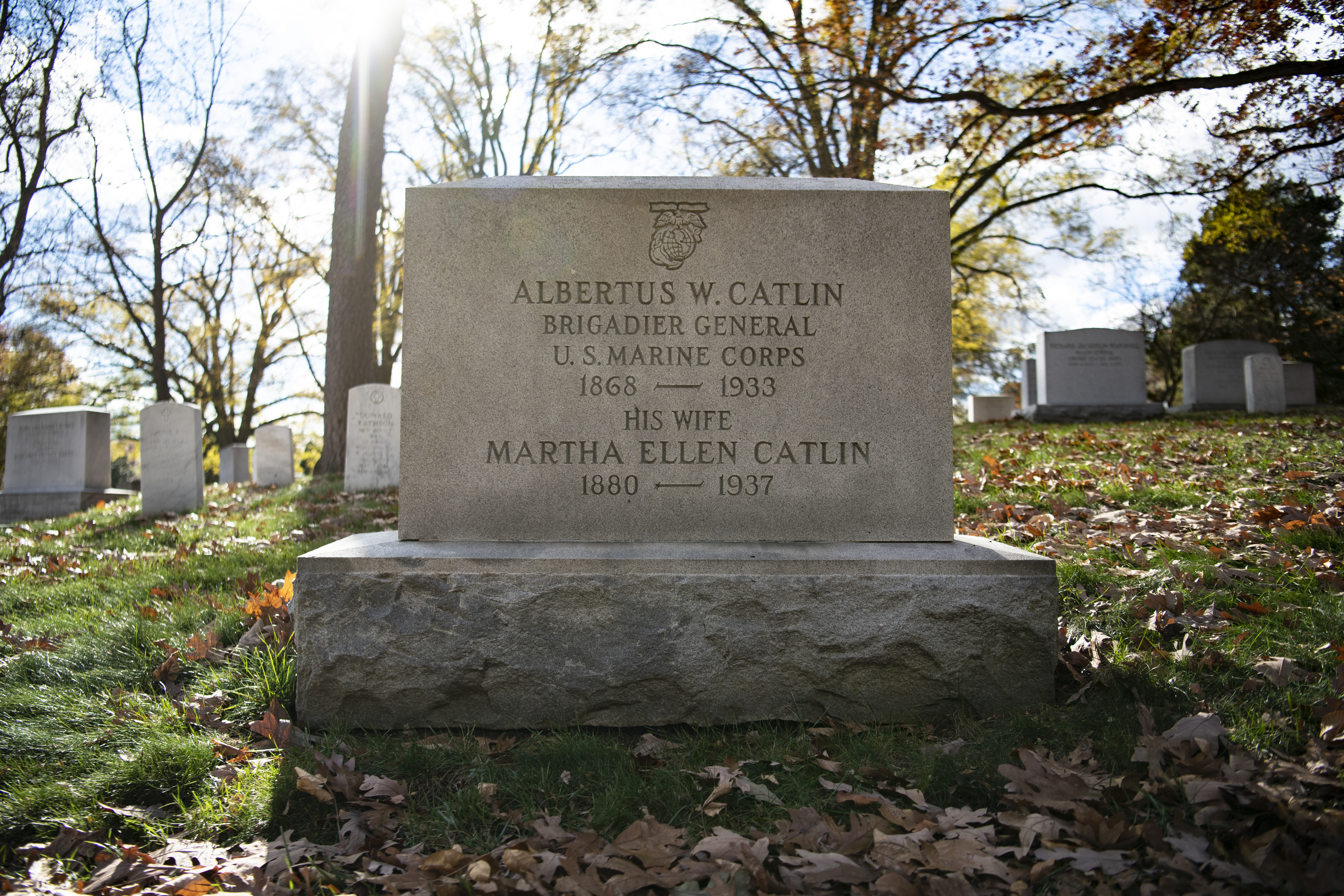
Grave at Arlington National Cemetery

Catlin then transferred to USS Maine and was in command of her Marine Detachment when the ship was destroyed in Havana Harbor in February 1898. During the Spanish–American War that followed, he served aboard the auxiliary cruiser St. Louis, which participated in the blockade of the harbor at Santiago de Cuba, and led a group of Marines and Sailors in an attempt to cut the undersea telegraph cable linking Cuba with Jamaica.

In June 1911, during salvaging operations of the Maine, Catlin's Mamaluke Sword was recovered "in a fair state of preservation," along with a penknife, from his quarters.

=== 1899–1913 ===
After serving in the Spanish–American War, he was ordered to the Marine Barracks at the Brooklyn Navy Yard, New York. In March 1899, he was promoted to captain and assigned to the Marine Barracks at Port Royal, South Carolina. In February 1902, Catlin received orders to the Marine Barracks at Cavite, Philippines. He was the first commanding officer of the Marine Barracks, Naval Station, Honolulu, Territory of Hawaii, serving there from February to July 1904. He then served in recruiting duty at Buffalo, New York from October 1904 until returning to the Marine Barracks at the Brooklyn Navy Yard the following spring. In June 1905, he was promoted to major.

On June 30, 1906, owing to the disturbed political conditions in the Dominican Republic, a battalion of Marines consisting of 7 officers and 204 enlisted men, under the command of Major Catlin, was assembled, embarked and sailed on board the USS Dixie, from the League Island Navy Yard for Monte Cristi. In the fall of 1906, he served with the First Provisional Regiment in Guantanamo Bay, Cuba, where he served until May 1909.

Catlin was then assigned to the Marine Barracks at Boston, Massachusetts, where he served the Post Quartermaster, and was later transferred to the Marine Barracks at the Philadelphia Navy Yard. Following that tour, in 1911, he returned to serve in Cuba where he commanded a battalion of the 1st Regiment, which formed at Guantanamo Bay on 8 March 1911. Beginning in the fall of 1911, Catlin served in succession on board USS Connecticut, USS Utah and USS Wyoming.

=== Medal of Honor action ===
While on board Wyoming, he participated in the intervention at Vera Cruz, Mexico. On 22 April 1914, Catlin bravely led the 3rd Marine Regiment, newly formed from shipboard Marine detachments, to capture the city. For his "distinguished conduct in battle" on this occasion, he was awarded the Medal of Honor for bravery.

==== Medal of Honor citation ====
CATLIN, Albertus Wright
Major, U. S. Marine Corps
G. O. Navy Department, No. 177
December 4, 1915

Citation:

For distinguished conduct in battle, engagement of VERA CRUZ, April 22, 1914. Was eminent and conspicuous in command of his battalion. He exhibited courage and skill in leading his men through the action of the 22nd and in the final occupation of the city.

=== World War I ===
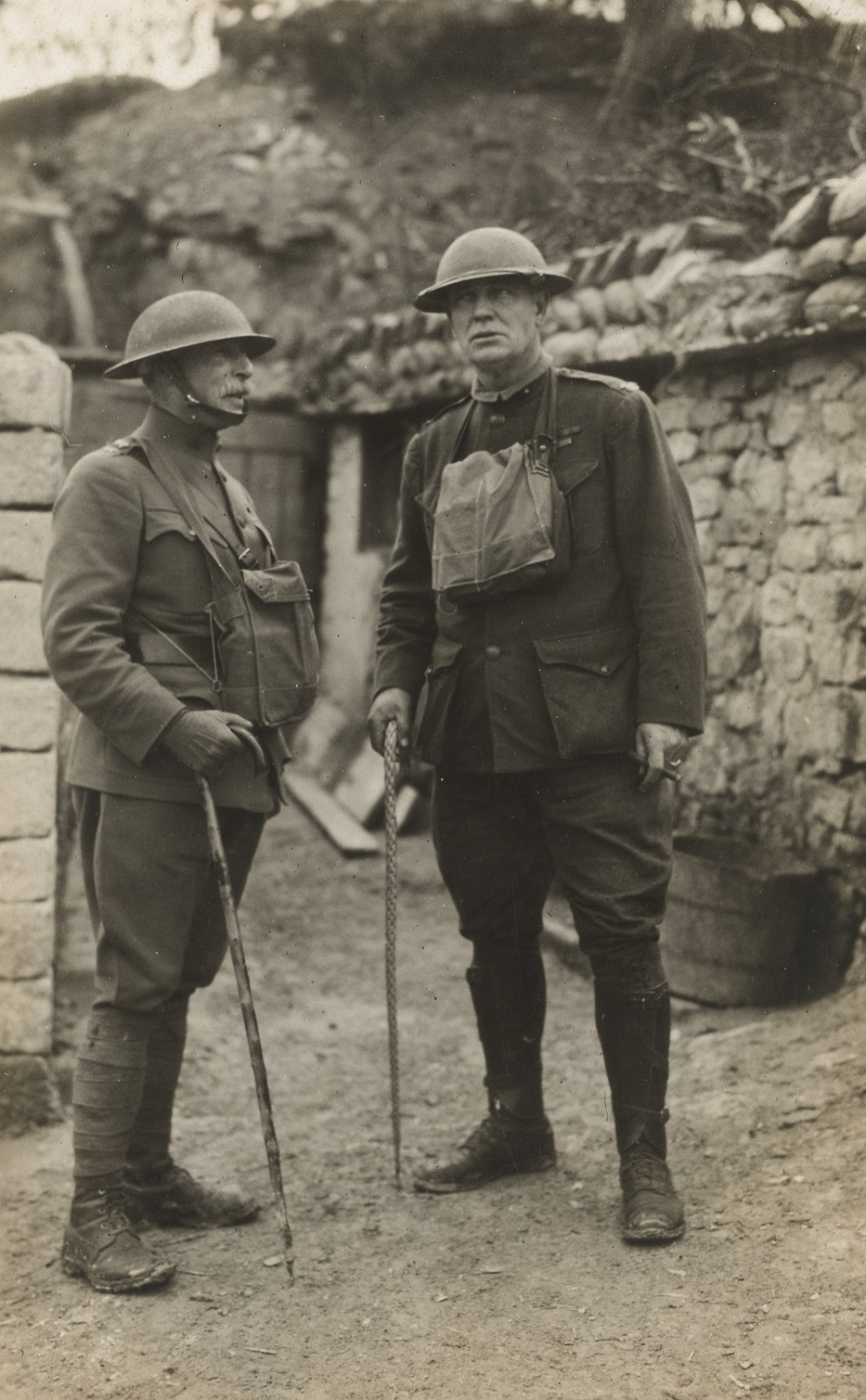
Major General Omar Bundy (left), commanding the 2nd Division, and Colonel Albertus W. Catlin, a recipient of the Medal of Honor, commanding the 6th Marine Regiment, at the front near Sommedieue, France, April 30, 1918.

In December 1914, Catlin commanded the Naval Prison at Portsmouth Navy Yard, Maine, while also having temporary duty at the Army Service Schools at Fort Leavenworth, Kansas. While at Portsmouth Navy Yard, he was promoted to lieutenant colonel in October 1915, which was followed with a promotion to colonel in February 1917.

Catlin graduated from the Army War College in May, one month after the American entry into World War I. Subsequently, he was placed in charge of the Marine overseas training camp at Quantico, Virginia.

In October 1917, Catlin was sent to France as commanding officer of the 6th Marine Regiment. The 6th Marines, together with the 5th Marine Regiment under Hiram I. Bearss, formed the 4th Marine Brigade, commanded by Charles A. Doyen, which itself formed part of the United States Army's 2nd Division of the American Expeditionary Forces.

From June 1–6, 1918, the 6th Marines saw action in the front lines from Paris-Metz Road through Lucy-le-Bocage to Hill 142. On June 6, with his regiment attacking Bois de Belleau, he was wounded in the chest by a sniper and evacuated to a hospital the next day. It was the first time he had been wounded in 28 years of active service. Harry Lee took over command of the 6th Marines in Catlin's place.

=== Final years and retirement ===
Upon returning to the United States, Colonel Catlin served at Headquarters Marine Corps and was appointed brigadier general on August 30, 1918. Following his tour at Headquarters, he was assigned to the Marine Barracks at Quantico, and in November 1918, he sailed for Haiti where he assumed command of the First Brigade of Marines until September 1919.

In December 1919, Brigadier General Catlin retired from the Marine Corps. As a result of his wound, he was in ill health until his death in Culpeper, Virginia, on May 31, 1933. Brigadier General Catlin is buried in Arlington National Cemetery. His wife, Martha Ellen Shultz Catlin (1880–1937) is buried with him.

== Honors and awards ==
In addition to the Medal of Honor, Catlin was awarded two Croix de Guerre, one with palms and one with gilt star for gallantry in action against the enemy at Belleau Wood. He was also made an Officer of the Legion of Honour for his services in the same sector.

Soon after his return from France, he summarized his war experiences in a book called With the Help of God and a Few Marines.

On Marine Corps Base Quantico, the base headquarters building in Lejeune Hall is on Catlin Avenue, which is named for him.

During World War II, in the Salt Lake area of Oʻahu, Hawaiʻi, Camp Catlin was formed to train Marines for fighting in the Pacific and became the first home for Headquarters, Fleet Marine Force, Pacific. As well, the SS George Washington was renamed the USS Catlin (AP-19) in his honor.

On December 1, 2006, Rear Admiral Harry Harris Jr., Captain Mark Leary, and Marine Major George Nunez, unveiled a monument dedicating Quarters M101 on Guantanamo Bay to the memory of Catlin. From that day forward, the flag quarters at the Marine Site will be known as Catlin House.

== See also ==
- List of Medal of Honor recipients (Veracruz)
