= Harry Lee (United States Marine) =

United States Marine Corps general

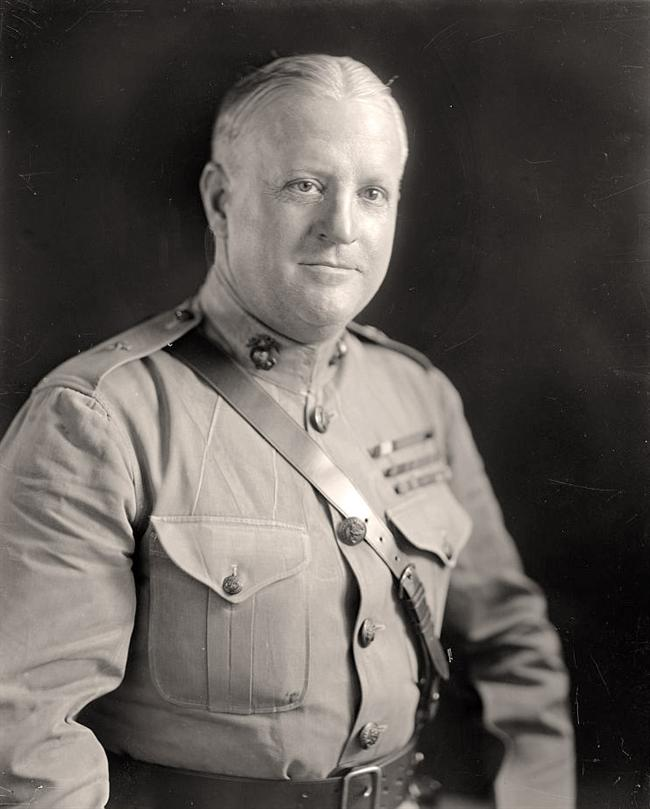
- Born: June 4, 1872; Washington, D.C., U.S.
- Died: May 13, 1935 (aged 62); Marine Corps Base Quantico, Virginia, U.S.
- Military career
- Allegiance: United States of America
- Branch: United States Marine Corps
- Service years: 1898–1933
- Rank: Major general
- Commands: 6th Marine Regiment; MB Parris Island; Marine Corps Base Quantico
- Conflicts: Spanish–American War; World War I: Battle of Château-Thierry (1918); Battle of Saint-Mihiel; Meuse-Argonne Offensive
- Awards: Navy Distinguished Service Medal; Army Distinguished Service Medal; Silver Star; Legion of Honor

Harry Lee (June 4, 1872 – May 13, 1935) was a decorated major general in the United States Marine Corps and a military governor of Santo Domingo.

== Early life and education ==
Harry Lee was born in Washington, D.C., on 4 June 1872.

== Career ==
Lee was appointed as a second lieutenant in the U.S. Marine Corps for the Spanish–American War on 2 August 1898. He served at the Havana Naval Station during the war, and following it, aboard various ships of the United States Navy and many Marine Corps stations.

Lee took command of the 6th Marine Regiment in June 1918, a year after the American entry into World War I, in succession to Albertus W. Catlin, who had been badly wounded. He led the unit through the battles at Château-Thierry, St. Mihiel, and the Meuse-Argonne Offensive, marching with the Army to the Rhine.

After the war, he commanded the Marine brigade in Santo Domingo, sent in 1921 to pacify the Dominican Republic and establish constitutional government. For 3 years, he served as military governor of the country.

Later, Lee commanded Marine Barracks, Parris Island. On 1 March 1933, he assumed command of the Marine Corps Base Quantico.

== Later life and death ==
Lee died on May 13, 1935, at age 62, at the Quantico Marine Base.

== Awards and decorations ==
For World War I service, Lee was awarded the Silver Star, Navy and also Army versions of the Distinguished Service Medal, the French Legion of Honor, and other decorations.

== Legacy ==
- USS Harry Lee (APA-10) was named after Lee.
- Harry Lee Hall on Marine Corps Base Quantico is named for MajGen Lee. Harry Lee Hall initially served as the Officer's Club, it is currently the home to the promotions branch of Headquarters Marine Corps.
