= Columbia School District (Mississippi) =

School district in Mississippi, United States

Address
- 613 Wildcat Way Columbia, Mississippi, 39429; United States

District information
- Type: Public
- Grades: PreK–12
- NCES District ID: 2801170

Students and staff
- Students: 1,635
- Teachers: 117.06
- Staff: 112.8
- Student–teacher ratio: 13.97

Other information
- Website: www.columbiaschools.org

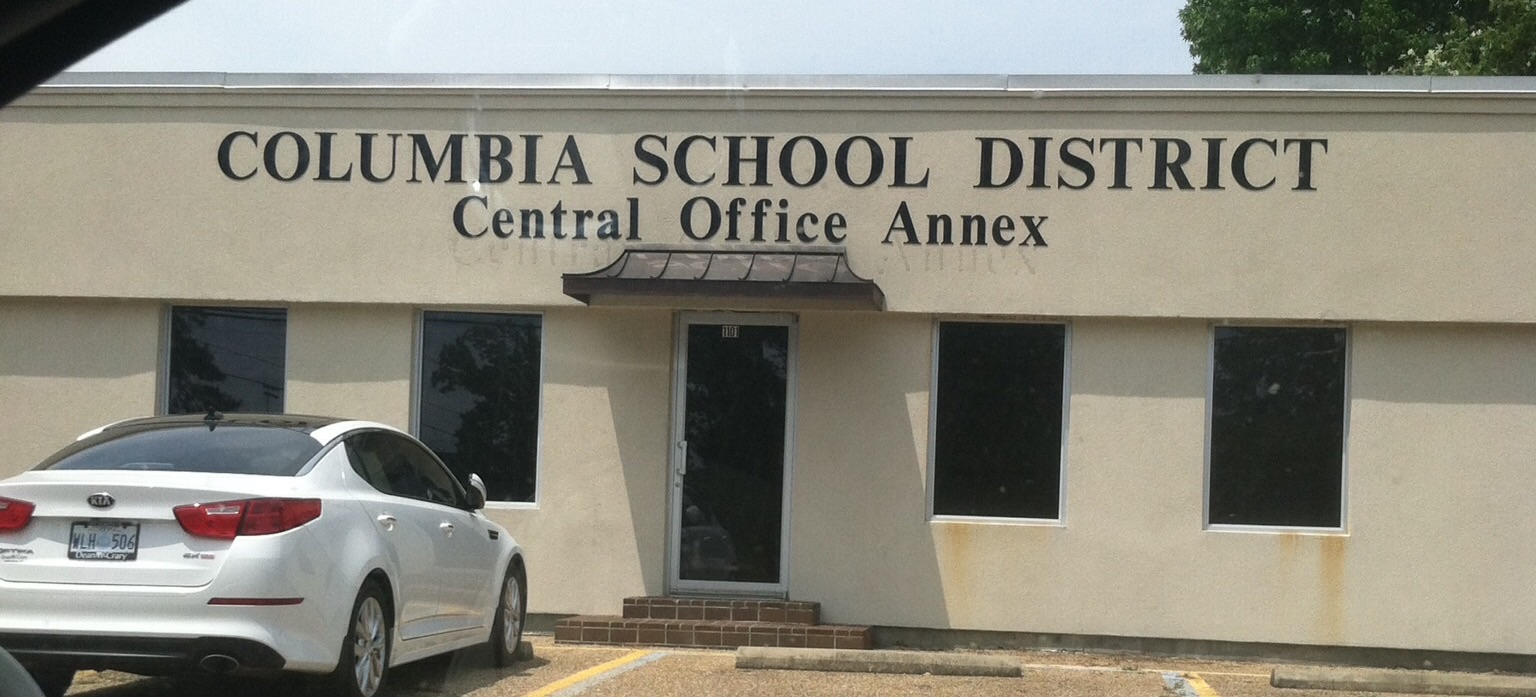
School district annex

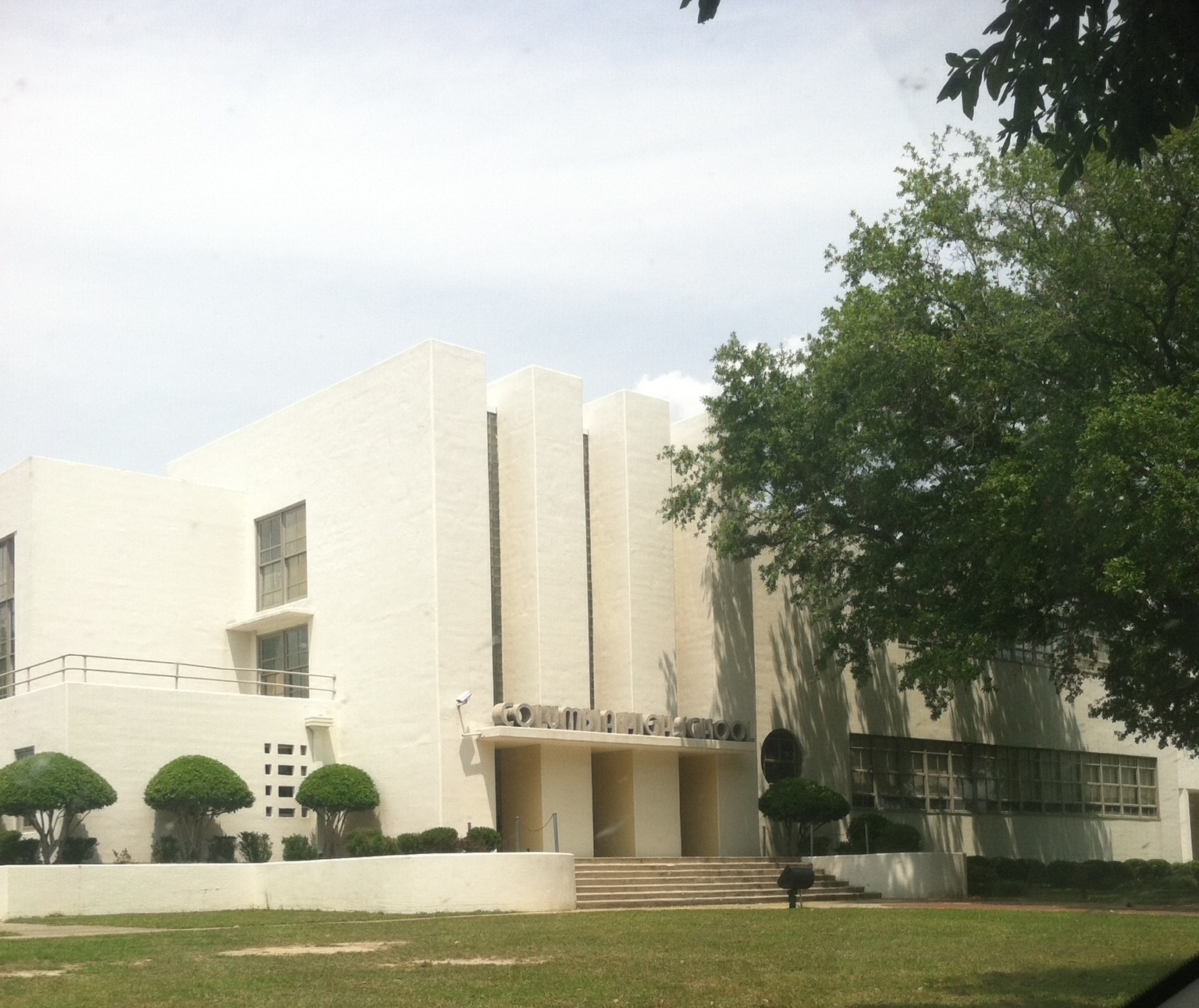
Columbia High School

The Columbia School District is a public school district based in Columbia, Mississippi (USA). Superintendent is Mr. Jason Harris. He has served since 2017, he is formerly the principal of Tupelo High School. Dr. Otha Belcher serves as the Director of Operations in the capacity of an assistant superintendent. He is known for his controversial years as the superintendent of the Cleveland School District 2019-2022, which he was dismissed from in the Fall of 2022.

== Schools ==
- Columbia High School (Grades 9–12)
- Jefferson Middle School (Grades 6–8)
- Columbia Elementary School (Grades 4–5)
- Columbia Primary School 2–3 (Grades 2–3)
- Columbia Primary School PK–1 (Grades PK–1)

== Demographics ==
=== 2006–07 school year ===
There were a total of 1,895 students enrolled in the Columbia School District during the 2006–2007 school year. The gender makeup of the district was 51% female and 49% male. The racial makeup of the district was 49.23% African American, 49.18% White, 1.11% Asian, 0.42% Hispanic, and 0.05% Native American. 67.1% of the district's students were eligible to receive free lunch.

=== Previous school years ===
School Year	Enrollment	Gender Makeup		Racial Makeup				
School Year	Enrollment	Female	Male	Asian	African American	Hispanic	Native American	White
2005–06	1,919	51%	49%	0.88%	50.18%	0.36%	–	48.57%
2004–05	1,900	50%	50%	0.84%	48.42%	0.37%	0.11%	50.26%
2003–04	1,873	50%	50%	0.69%	47.30%	0.37%	0.05%	51.58%
2002–03	1,863	48%	52%	0.64%	45.14%	0.48%	0.05%	53.68%

== Accountability statistics ==
	2006-07	2005-06	2004-05	2003-04	2002-03
District Accreditation Status	Accredited	Accredited	Accredited	Accredited	Accredited
School Performance Classifications
Level 5 (Superior Performing) Schools	0	1	1	1	1
Level 4 (Exemplary) Schools	4	3	2	3	0
Level 3 (Successful) Schools	0	0	1	0	3
Level 2 (Under Performing) Schools	0	0	0	0	0
Level 1 (Low Performing) Schools	0	0	0	0	0
Not Assigned	0	0	0	0	0

== See also ==
- List of school districts in Mississippi
