= Marion County School District (Mississippi) =

School district in Mississippi

Coordinates: 31.258688°N 89.834899°W

The Marion County School District is a public school district based in Marion County, Mississippi (USA). The superintendent is Mr. Brian Foster, appointed March 1, 2025.

== Schools ==
=== High Schools and Middle Schools ===
- East Marion High School Eagles
- East Marion Middle school Eagles
- West Marion High School Trojans
- West Marion Middle School Trojans

=== Elementary Schools ===
- East Marion Elementary School
- West Marion Primary School

== Demographics ==
=== 2006-07 school year ===
There were a total of 2,534 students enrolled in the Marion County School District during the 2006–2007 school year. The gender makeup of the district was 47% female and 53% male. The racial makeup of the district was 44.12% African American, 55.33% White, 0.43% Hispanic, 0.08% Asian, and 0.04% Native American. 71.0% of the district's students were eligible to receive free lunch.

=== Previous school years ===
School Year	Enrollment	Gender Makeup		Racial Makeup				
School Year	Enrollment	Female	Male	Asian	African American	Hispanic	Native American	White
2005-06	2,556	47%	53%	0.16%	45.11%	0.59%	0.04%	54.11%
2004-05	2,521	48%	52%	0.04%	45.30%	0.67%	–	53.99%
2003-04	2,523	48%	52%	0.04%	44.99%	0.67%	0.04%	54.26%
2002-03	2,594	48%	52%	0.08%	46.22%	0.42%	–	53.28%

== Accountability statistics ==
	2006-07	2005-06	2004-05	2003-04	2002-03
District Accreditation Status	Accredited	Accredited	Accredited	Accredited	Accredited
School Performance Classifications
Level 5 (Superior Performing) Schools	0	0	0	0	0
Level 4 (Exemplary) Schools	0	0	1	2	1
Level 3 (Successful) Schools	4	7	6	5	5
Level 2 (Under Performing) Schools	2	0	0	0	0
Level 1 (Low Performing) Schools	0	0	0	0	0
Not Assigned	0	0	0	1	2

== See also ==
- List of school districts in Mississippi
- Foxworth, Mississippi
