= Columbia, Mississippi =

- City
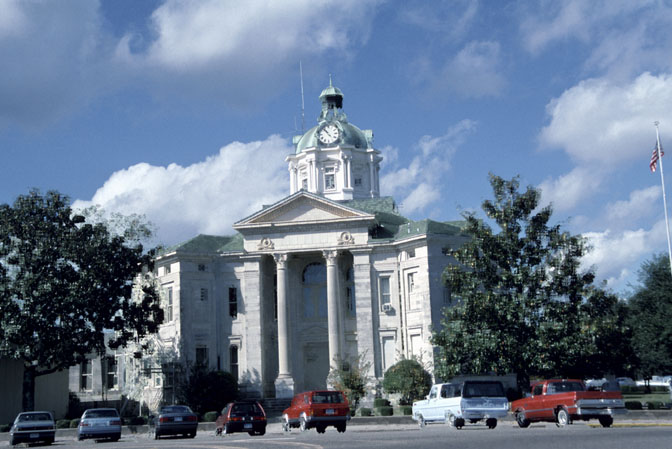
- Marion County courthouse in Columbia

- Flag Seal

- Location in Marion County and the state of Mississippi

- Location in the United States
- Coordinates: 31°15′24″N 89°49′44″W
- Country: United States
- State: Mississippi
- County: Marion

Government
  - Mayor: Justin McKenzie (R)

Area
  - Total: 6.76 sq mi (17.50 km^{2})
  - Land: 6.75 sq mi (17.49 km^{2})
  - Water: 0.0039 sq mi (0.01 km^{2})
- Elevation: 148 ft (45 m)

Population (2020)
  - Total: 5,864
  - Density: 868/sq mi (335.2/km^{2})
- Time zone: UTC-6 (Central (CST))
  - Summer (DST): UTC-5 (CDT)
- ZIP code: 39429
- Area code: 601
- FIPS code: 28-15340
- GNIS feature ID: 0668715
- Website: www.cityofcolumbiams.com

Columbia is a city in and the county seat of Marion County, Mississippi, United States. Formed six years before Mississippi was admitted to statehood, Columbia was named for Columbia, South Carolina, from which many of the early settlers had migrated. The population was 5,864 as of the 2020 census, down from 6,582 in 2010.

== History ==
Columbia is the county seat of Marion County, which was created out of Amite County in 1811, encompassing the southwest quarter of the current state of Mississippi. Before statehood in 1816, there were three territorial census/poll tax records taken of what was deemed Marion County at the time. These records reveal that during 1813, several Lott men arrived and settled on the Pearl River in what is now Columbia. In 1813, William Lott was the largest slave holder near present-day Columbia, owning 28 people. Five mensettled south of present-day Columbia on 2,789 acres (1,129 ha) of land with 65 enslaved people. North of present-day Columbia, on what was the earliest attempt at a town, Timothy Terrell enslaved 32 people on 3,151 acres (1,275 ha).

The land on which the current city of Columbia resides was first purchased for cash on April 18, 1820, by William Lott and John Lott. This land is Township 3 East, Range 18 West, Section 5 (640 acres), which is now the center of Columbia. Other early patent holders of Columbia include James Phillips, Jr., and John Cooper (1825), in Section 4 next to John and William Lott.

Columbia was officially incorporated on June 25, 1819, becoming the fourth municipality in the state of Mississippi. It served as the temporary capital of Mississippi from November 1821, when the 5th session of the Mississippi Legislature first met there, until 1822. In that year, a special session of the legislature met in Columbia, inaugurating Governor Walter Leake, and selecting LeFleur's Bluff (now Jackson) as the permanent capital.

Columbia, "The City of Charm on the River Pearl", has always been in danger of flooding, due to its bordering the Pearl River. The county courthouse, with its records dating back to pre-statehood, has managed to survive war, floods, tornadoes and hurricanes. In its first 100 years, Columbia relied on the Pearl River for transportation of goods. The river was much deeper and wider than it is now. Steamboat captains, such as John Black, lived in Columbia.

During the Civil War, Union troops under the command of General John Wynn Davidson camped outside Columbia, taking provisions from the local population. The courthouse was spared. The Southern Claims Commission Files detail these events.

During the civil rights movement, Columbia and Marion County were the site of peaceful demonstrations, due to the diligent insistence of non-violence by Sheriff John Homer Willoughby. . In 2014, a tornado measuring EF3 on the Enhanced Fujita scale struck Columbia, causing widespread damage. Mutual aid took place between Columbia, Mississippi, and Columbia, South Carolina, following this natural disaster and the 1,000 year flood in South Carolina,

== Geography ==
Columbia is in southern Mississippi, on the east bank of the Pearl River. It is in north-central Marion County, 84 miles (135 km) by highway south of Jackson, the state capital, and 118 miles (190 km) north of New Orleans. U.S. Route 98 passes through the south side of the city, leading east 33 miles (53 km) to Hattiesburg and west 41 miles (66 km) to McComb. Mississippi Highway 13 passes through the center of Columbia, leading north 25 miles (40 km) to Prentiss and southeast 31 miles (50 km) to Lumberton. State Highway 44 leads northeast from Columbia 21 miles (34 km) to Sumrall.

According to the U.S. Census Bureau, the city of Columbia has a total area of 6.8 square miles (18 km^{2}), of which 0.004 square miles (0.010 km^{2}), or 0.06%, are water.

== Climate ==
According to the Köppen Climate Classification system, Columbia has a humid subtropical climate, abbreviated "Cfa" on climate maps. The hottest temperature recorded in Columbia was 113 °F (45.0 °C) on June 7, 1915, while the coldest temperature recorded was 4 °F (−15.6 °C) on January 11, 1982 and January 21, 1985.

Climate data for Columbia, Mississippi, 1991–2020 normals, extremes 1903–present
Month	Jan	Feb	Mar	Apr	May	Jun	Jul	Aug	Sep	Oct	Nov	Dec	Year
Record high °F (°C)	85 (29)	88 (31)	90 (32)	98 (37)	102 (39)	113 (45)	107 (42)	107 (42)	108 (42)	99 (37)	91 (33)	85 (29)	113 (45)
Mean maximum °F (°C)	76.2 (24.6)	79.7 (26.5)	84.0 (28.9)	86.8 (30.4)	92.3 (33.5)	96.2 (35.7)	97.3 (36.3)	97.8 (36.6)	95.5 (35.3)	90.2 (32.3)	82.7 (28.2)	78.1 (25.6)	99.1 (37.3)
Mean daily maximum °F (°C)	59.9 (15.5)	64.1 (17.8)	71.3 (21.8)	77.5 (25.3)	84.6 (29.2)	90.0 (32.2)	91.6 (33.1)	91.8 (33.2)	88.1 (31.2)	79.7 (26.5)	69.1 (20.6)	61.9 (16.6)	77.5 (25.3)
Daily mean °F (°C)	48.8 (9.3)	52.8 (11.6)	59.6 (15.3)	66.1 (18.9)	73.9 (23.3)	80.1 (26.7)	82.0 (27.8)	81.9 (27.7)	77.7 (25.4)	67.7 (19.8)	56.9 (13.8)	51.0 (10.6)	66.5 (19.2)
Mean daily minimum °F (°C)	37.6 (3.1)	41.5 (5.3)	47.9 (8.8)	54.6 (12.6)	63.2 (17.3)	70.2 (21.2)	72.4 (22.4)	72.0 (22.2)	67.2 (19.6)	55.6 (13.1)	44.7 (7.1)	40.0 (4.4)	55.6 (13.1)
Mean minimum °F (°C)	21.9 (−5.6)	26.3 (−3.2)	30.6 (−0.8)	38.6 (3.7)	48.9 (9.4)	61.7 (16.5)	67.0 (19.4)	65.5 (18.6)	54.4 (12.4)	38.8 (3.8)	29.6 (−1.3)	26.1 (−3.3)	20.1 (−6.6)
Record low °F (°C)	4 (−16)	11 (−12)	16 (−9)	23 (−5)	37 (3)	46 (8)	53 (12)	54 (12)	36 (2)	22 (−6)	17 (−8)	5 (−15)	4 (−16)
Average precipitation inches (mm)	6.52 (166)	5.21 (132)	5.72 (145)	5.22 (133)	4.35 (110)	5.77 (147)	6.05 (154)	6.04 (153)	3.60 (91)	3.75 (95)	3.86 (98)	5.79 (147)	61.88 (1,571)
Average precipitation days (≥ 0.01 in)	11.2	10.1	9.8	8.0	8.7	11.1	12.5	10.9	7.9	6.9	8.1	10.1	115.3
Source 1: NOAA
Source 2: National Weather Service

== Demographics ==
Historical population
Census	Pop.	Note	%±
1870	66		—
1900	507		—
1910	2,029		300.2%
1920	2,826		39.3%
1930	4,833		71.0%
1940	6,064		25.5%
1950	6,124		1.0%
1960	7,117		16.2%
1970	7,587		6.6%
1980	7,733		1.9%
1990	6,815		−11.9%
2000	6,603		−3.1%
2010	6,582		−0.3%
2020	5,864		−10.9%
U.S. Decennial Census

=== 2020 census ===
As of the 2020 census, Columbia had a population of 5,864. There were 1,155 families residing in the city.

The median age was 39.5 years. 22.9% of residents were under the age of 18 and 19.0% of residents were 65 years of age or older. For every 100 females there were 100.1 males, and for every 100 females age 18 and over there were 97.0 males age 18 and over.

98.2% of residents lived in urban areas, while 1.8% lived in rural areas.

There were 2,201 households in Columbia, of which 30.3% had children under the age of 18 living in them. Of all households, 33.0% were married-couple households, 19.9% were households with a male householder and no spouse or partner present, and 42.0% were households with a female householder and no spouse or partner present. About 34.8% of all households were made up of individuals and 16.4% had someone living alone who was 65 years of age or older.

There were 2,650 housing units, of which 16.9% were vacant. The homeowner vacancy rate was 3.3% and the rental vacancy rate was 9.8%.

Columbia racial composition as of 2020
Race	Num.	Perc.
White (non-Hispanic)	3,042	51.88%
Black or African American (non-Hispanic)	2,483	42.34%
Native American	15	0.26%
Asian	26	0.44%
Other/Mixed	154	2.63%
Hispanic or Latino	144	2.46%

== Government and infrastructure ==
The Mississippi Department of Human Services's Division of Youth Services operated the Columbia Training School in unincorporated Marion County, near Columbia.

The mayor of Columbia is Justin McKenzie.

== Education ==
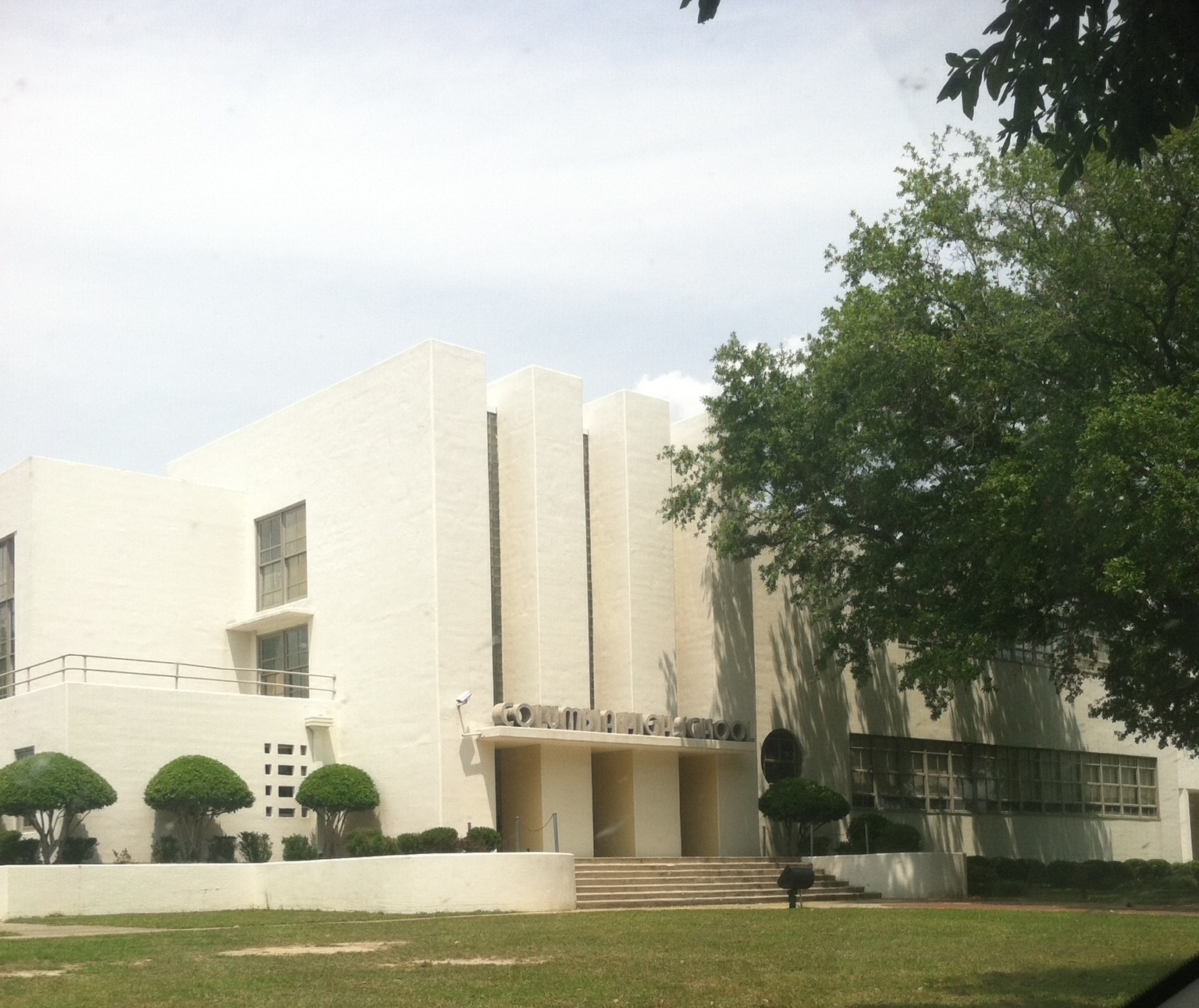
Columbia High School

Almost all of the city of Columbia is within the Columbia School District, with Columbia High School as the public high school. Prior to January 1970, black students were educated in a separate system with sub-par facilities, including John J. Jefferson High school, which became the middle school in January 1970 when the schools were integrated. White politicians called for a public boycott of the school system. At that time, around 100 white students left the public school system to attend the newly founded whites-only Columbia Academy, which was created in September 1969 as a segregation academy to avoid racial integration. A few students also left to attend Improve Academy, another segregation academy founded by the Improve Baptist Church.

A small portion of the city limits is within the Marion County School District. There are also two other public schools that are in the county, East Marion High School and West Marion High School. Both of these schools are under the Marion County School District. East Marion High school is located just outside of the Columbia city limits on the East side of the Pearl River, and it has a Columbia postal address, while West Marion is located on the West side of the Pearl River next to Foxworth. East Marion is one largely connected building that houses grades K-12, but West Marion has a primary school as well as a high school.

Marion County is in the service area of Pearl River Community College.

== Notable people ==
- Johnathan Abram, National Football League (NFL) safety for the Las Vegas Raiders
- Anthony Alford, former Major League Baseball player
- Ted Alford, former Canadian Football League (CFL) player
- James W. Ball, 24th Chief of Ordnance for the United States Army Ordnance Corps
- Earl W. Bascom, rodeo champion, Hollywood actor, artist/sculptor, inventor, Mississippi Rodeo Hall of Fame inductee
- Texas Rose Bascom, rodeo performer, trick roper, Hollywood actress, Mississippi Rodeo Hall of Fame inductee
- Buddy Blair, former Major League Baseball player
- Terrell Buckley, American football coach and former player
- L. Russ Bush, theologian and author
- Gil Carmichael, businessman and political candidate
- Logan Cooke, NFL punter for the Jacksonville Jaguars
- Maurice Dantin, attorney and political candidate
- Eagle Day, former NFL and CFL quarterback
- Peggy Dow, film actress and philanthropist
- Jim Dunaway, former NFL defensive tackle
- Joey Gathright, former Major League Baseball player
- Bobby Hamilton, former NFL defensive end, two-time Super Bowl winner with New England Patriots
- S. J. Hathorn, member of the Mississippi House of Representatives from 1904 to 1908 and the Mississippi Senate from 1917 to 1918
- Terry Irvin, former CFL cornerback
- Claudis James, former NFL player
- Kenny Johnson, former NFL player
- General Benjamin Lee, military leader and early political figure
- Carey B. Maddox-Preston, social worker
- Sylvester Magee, reputedly the last living American slave, died in Columbia in 1971
- Ken Morgan, member of the Mississippi House of Representatives
- Jaheim Oatis, American football defensive tackle
- Joseph T. "Joe" Owens, former NFL defensive end
- Eddie Payton, former NFL running back
- Walter Payton, former NFL player
- Johnny Sims, former Arena Football League player
- Ethelbert I. Singley, member of the Mississippi House of Representatives from 1916 to 1920
- Jackie Smith, former NFL tight end and member of the Pro Football Hall of Fame
- Ruby Terry, gospel musician
- Hugh L. White, former Columbia mayor and two-term Governor of Mississippi
