= Marion County, Mississippi =

County in Mississippi, United States

- County
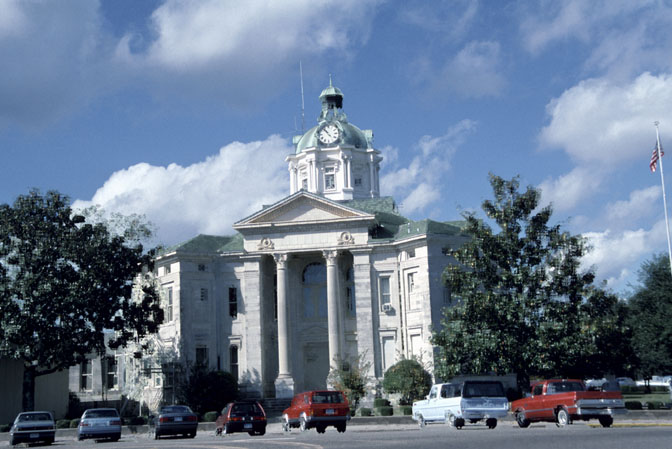
- Marion County Courthouse in Columbia

- Flag

- Location within the U.S. state of Mississippi
- Coordinates: 31°14′N 89°49′W
- Country: United States
- State: Mississippi
- Founded: 1811
- Named for: Francis Marion
- Seat: Columbia
- Largest city: Columbia

Area
  - Total: 549 sq mi (1,420 km^{2})
  - Land: 542 sq mi (1,400 km^{2})
  - Water: 6.2 sq mi (16 km^{2}) 1.1%

Population (2020)
  - Total: 24,441
  - Estimate (2025): 24,001 ▼
  - Density: 45.1/sq mi (17.4/km^{2})
- Time zone: UTC−6 (Central)
  - Summer (DST): UTC−5 (CDT)
- Congressional district: 3rd
- Website: www.marioncountyms.com

Marion County is a county located in the U.S. state of Mississippi. As of the 2020 census, the population was 24,441. Its county seat is Columbia. Marion County is named for American Revolutionary War guerrilla leader Francis Marion also known as The Swamp Fox.

== Geography ==
According to the U.S. Census Bureau, the county has a total area of 549 square miles (1,420 km^{2}), of which 542 square miles (1,400 km^{2}) is land and 6.2 square miles (16 km^{2}) (1.1%) is water.

=== Major highways ===
- U.S. Highway 98
- Mississippi Highway 13
- Mississippi Highway 35
- Mississippi Highway 43
- Mississippi Highway 44

=== Adjacent counties ===
- Jefferson Davis County (north)
- Lamar County (east)
- Pearl River County (southeast)
- Washington Parish, Louisiana (south)
- Walthall County (west)
- Lawrence County (northwest)

== Demographics ==
Historical population
Census	Pop.	Note	%±
1820	3,116		—
1830	3,691		18.5%
1840	3,830		3.8%
1850	4,410		15.1%
1860	4,686		6.3%
1870	4,211		−10.1%
1880	6,901		63.9%
1890	9,532		38.1%
1900	13,501		41.6%
1910	15,599		15.5%
1920	17,144		9.9%
1930	19,923		16.2%
1940	24,085		20.9%
1950	23,967		−0.5%
1960	23,293		−2.8%
1970	22,871		−1.8%
1980	25,708		12.4%
1990	25,544		−0.6%
2000	25,595		0.2%
2010	27,088		5.8%
2020	24,441		−9.8%
2025 (est.)	24,001	▼	−1.8%
U.S. Decennial Census; 1790-1960 1900-1990; 1990-2000 2010-2013

=== Racial and ethnic composition ===
Marion County, Mississippi – Racial and ethnic composition Note: the US Census treats Hispanic/Latino as an ethnic category. This table excludes Latinos from the racial categories and assigns them to a separate category. Hispanics/Latinos may be of any race.
Race / Ethnicity (NH = Non-Hispanic)	Pop 1980	Pop 1990	Pop 2000	Pop 2010	Pop 2020	% 1980	% 1990	% 2000	% 2010	% 2020
White alone (NH)	17,872	17,651	17,063	17,661	15,721	69.52%	69.10%	66.67%	65.20%	64.32%
Black or African American alone (NH)	7,558	7,683	8,106	8,729	7,583	29.40%	30.08%	31.67%	32.22%	31.03%
Native American or Alaska Native alone (NH)	23	23	58	42	42	0.09%	0.09%	0.23%	0.16%	0.17%
Asian alone (NH)	14	44	53	84	65	0.05%	0.17%	0.21%	0.31%	0.27%
Native Hawaiian or Pacific Islander alone (NH)	x	x	1	9	0	x	x	0.00%	0.03%	0.00%
Other race alone (NH)	0	6	6	10	46	0.00%	0.02%	0.02%	0.04%	0.19%
Mixed race or Multiracial (NH)	x	x	150	217	578	x	x	0.59%	0.80%	2.36%
Hispanic or Latino (any race)	241	137	158	336	406	0.94%	0.54%	0.62%	1.24%	1.66%
Total	25,708	25,544	25,595	27,088	24,441	100.00%	100.00%	100.00%	100.00%	100.00%

=== 2020 census ===
As of the 2020 census, the county had a population of 24,441. The median age was 40.8 years. 23.6% of residents were under the age of 18 and 19.3% of residents were 65 years of age or older. For every 100 females there were 96.0 males, and for every 100 females age 18 and over there were 94.2 males age 18 and over.

The racial makeup of the county was 64.7% White, 31.2% Black or African American, 0.2% American Indian and Alaska Native, 0.3% Asian, <0.1% Native Hawaiian and Pacific Islander, 0.9% from some other race, and 2.7% from two or more races. Hispanic or Latino residents of any race comprised 1.7% of the population.

25.5% of residents lived in urban areas, while 74.5% lived in rural areas.

There were 9,520 households in the county, of which 31.3% had children under the age of 18 living in them. Of all households, 45.3% were married-couple households, 18.8% were households with a male householder and no spouse or partner present, and 31.0% were households with a female householder and no spouse or partner present. About 28.3% of all households were made up of individuals and 13.8% had someone living alone who was 65 years of age or older.

There were 11,080 housing units, of which 14.1% were vacant. Among occupied housing units, 78.1% were owner-occupied and 21.9% were renter-occupied. The homeowner vacancy rate was 1.5% and the rental vacancy rate was 10.5%.

== Government and infrastructure ==
The Mississippi Department of Human Services's Division of Youth Services operated the Columbia Training School in unincorporated Marion County. The facility was closed in 2008.

== Politics ==
Marion County is a Republican stronghold, having only voted for a Democrat once since the 1960s. Its Republican tilt has been increasingly evident in recent years, with the 2024 presidential election showing the strongest Republican support in the county since 1972.

United States presidential election results for Marion County, Mississippi
Year	Republican		Democratic		Third party(ies)	
Year	No.	%	No.	%	No.	%
1912	12	2.51%	438	91.44%	29	6.05%
1916	51	6.01%	792	93.40%	5	0.59%
1920	143	18.52%	613	79.40%	16	2.07%
1924	99	8.70%	1,039	91.30%	0	0.00%
1928	526	36.33%	922	63.67%	0	0.00%
1932	94	3.71%	2,429	95.97%	8	0.32%
1936	37	1.88%	1,932	98.07%	1	0.05%
1940	45	2.11%	2,083	97.89%	0	0.00%
1944	54	2.16%	2,441	97.84%	0	0.00%
1948	49	1.79%	205	7.47%	2,491	90.75%
1952	1,420	35.35%	2,597	64.65%	0	0.00%
1956	611	20.15%	1,751	57.75%	670	22.10%
1960	698	22.92%	1,082	35.53%	1,265	41.54%
1964	5,469	91.55%	505	8.45%	0	0.00%
1968	763	9.16%	1,722	20.66%	5,848	70.18%
1972	6,805	79.40%	1,693	19.75%	72	0.84%
1976	5,300	49.36%	5,283	49.20%	154	1.43%
1980	5,218	48.73%	5,366	50.12%	123	1.15%
1984	7,355	66.11%	3,757	33.77%	13	0.12%
1988	7,019	61.87%	4,240	37.38%	85	0.75%
1992	5,776	49.74%	4,654	40.08%	1,183	10.19%
1996	5,023	50.39%	4,334	43.48%	611	6.13%
2000	6,796	61.79%	4,114	37.41%	88	0.80%
2004	7,999	66.95%	3,888	32.54%	60	0.50%
2008	8,513	65.43%	4,422	33.99%	75	0.58%
2012	8,237	64.71%	4,393	34.51%	99	0.78%
2016	7,836	67.01%	3,677	31.45%	180	1.54%
2020	8,273	67.94%	3,787	31.10%	117	0.96%
2024	7,874	70.38%	3,215	28.74%	99	0.88%

== Communities ==
=== City ===
- Columbia (county seat & only incorporated place)

=== Census-designated places ===
- Foxworth
- Kokomo

=== Unincorporated communities ===
- Bunker Hill
- Cheraw
- Expose, an unincorporated area of Marion County that was founded by Harry Solomon Expose (born 1861), a community leader who owned a general store and served as postmaster. Monroe Work's Negro Yearbook listed it among "Negro Towns and Settlements in the United States." Football great Walter Payton's mother Alyne Sibley Payton was born in Expose on January 14, 1926.
- Good Hope
- Goss
- Hopewell
- Hub
- Morgantown
- Sandy Hook

== Education ==
There are two school districts in the county: Columbia School District and Marion County School District.

The county is in the service area of Pearl River Community College.

== Notable people ==
- Earl W. Bascom (1906–1995), "Father of Modern Rodeo," Mississippi Rodeo Hall of Fame inductee, producer of Marion County's first rodeo in 1935
- Charles C. Bass (1875–1975), "Father of Preventive Dentistry"; researcher in tropical medicine
- Charles Coleman (American football) (born 1963), American football player
- Logan Cooke - NFL punter
- Peggy Dow, American actress
- Walter Payton, American football player

== See also ==
- National Register of Historic Places listings in Marion County, Mississippi
