= 1916–1920 Mississippi Legislature =

The 1916-1920 (or 84th) Mississippi Legislature met in three sessions, from January to April 1916, from September to October 1917, and from January to March 1918. 45 senators and 133 representatives were in each session.

== District apportionment ==
=== Senate ===
In the 1916 session, the Senate was made of 38 senatorial districts. After the constitutional amendment of 1916, 4 more districts were added. Some districts had more than one representative.

=== House ===
From 1916 to 1920, each county served as a district with representatives. There were some floater representatives that served between two different counties.

== Party breakdown ==
=== Senate ===
Affiliation	Members
Democratic Party	45
Other party^{*}	0
Seat Vacant^{**}	0
Total	45

=== House of Representatives ===
Affiliation	Members
Democratic Party	132
Other party^{*}	1
Seat Vacant^{**}	0
Total	133

== Officers ==
=== Senate ===
==== Presiding Officer ====
Position	Name	Party	District
President	Lee M. Russell	Democratic Party	n/a
President Pro Tempore	Carroll Kendrick	Democratic Party	37

=== House of Representatives ===
==== Presiding Officer ====
Position	Name	Party	County
Speaker of the House	Martin S. Conner	Democratic Party	Covington

== Members of the Mississippi State Senate, 1916-1920 ==
District	Name	Party	Residence
1	Francis Marion Johnson (1916)	D	Ford
1	Zachary Taylor Champlin (1918)	D	Biloxi
2	Columbus W. Walley	D	Waynesboro
3	John W. White	D	Rose Hill
4	Henry Clay Yawn (1916)	D	Lumberton
4	Bee King (1918)	D	Mendenhall
5	Edgar M. Lane	D	Taylorsville
6	Charles E. Thompson	D	Garden City
7	Daniel W. Huff	D	Centerville
8	E. Harvey McGehee	D	Monticello
9	William C. Bowman	D	Natchez
10	Battaille H. Wade	D	Tillman
11	James M. Coen	D	Mizpah
12	Joseph A. Baker	D	Jackson
12	G. Edward Williams (1916)	D	Jackson
12	George Anderson (1918)	D	Vicksburg
12	H. K. Murray	D	Vicksburg
13	Lamar Q. C. Williams	D	Union
14	Richard E. Thompson	D	Toomsuba
15	John A. Clark	D	DeKalb
16	John Q. Poindexter	D	Ravine
17	Earl S. Richardson	D	Philadelphia
18	Clarence B. Greaves	D	Flora
19	Peter Stubblefield	D	Yazoo City
20	Lorraine C. Dulaney	D	Grace
21	Homer H. Casteel	D	Pickens
22	David E. Crawley	D	Kosciusko
23	William R. Chrismond	D	Ackerman
24	Scheller A. Miller	D	West Point
25	William P. Stribling	D	Columbus
26	Lewis S. Hemphill	D	Valley Hill
27	William M. Whittington	D	Greenwood
28	James A. Blount	D	Grenada
29	Van Buren Boddie (1916)	D	Greenville
29	Walton Shields (1918)	D	Greenville
29	John F. Burrow	D	Ruleville
30	Walter B. Parks	D	Merigold
31	N. W. Bradford	D	Houston
31	Marshal T. Adams	D	Pontotoc
32	James C. Eskridge	D	DeLay
33	Calvin B. Vance	D	Batesville
34	Lester C. Franklin	D	Clarksdale
35	John W. Barbee (1916) (Note: Resigned before 1918 session)	D	Hernando
35	Joseph N. Brown (1918)	D	Olive Branch
36	William H. Dyson	D	Hickory Flat
36	Sam C. Mims, Jr.	D	Holly Springs
36	Henry Clay Collins	D	Myrtle
37	Carroll Kendrick	D	Kendrick
38	Thomas K. Boggan	D	Tupelo
38	Anthony J. Cox	D	Smithville
39	S. J. Hathorn (1918)	D	Columbia
40	Henry Clay Yawn (1918)	D	Lumberton
41	Francis M. Johnson (1918)	D	Ford
42	Claude E. Hill (1918)	D	Hattiesburg

== Members of the Mississippi State House of Representatives, 1916-1920 ==
County	Name	Party	Full terms of office	Residence
Adams	Walter G. Green	D	1916–1920	Natchez
Adams	L. T. Kennedy	D	1918–1932	Natchez
Adams	Albert B. Sojourner	D	1916–1924	Natchez
Alcorn	Robert B. Cotton (Note: Died in 1917) (1916)	D	1911–1917	Corinth
Alcorn	J. R. Hill (1918)	D	1917-1920	
Alcorn	John B. Splann	D	1916–1920	Kendrick
Amite	John F. Cassels	D	1916–1920	Gloster
Amite	Drury Wall	D	1916–1920	Peoria
Attala	James C. Wasson	D	1916–1920	Ethel
Attala	Icey W. Day	D	1916–1920; 1932–1940; 1944–1952	Ethel
Benton	Roderick McGill	D	1916–1920	Falkner
Bolivar	Walter Sillers, Jr.	D	1916–1966	Rosedale
Bolivar	Stanley F. Gaines	D	1916–1920	Boyle
Calhoun	John B. Going	D	1908–1920, 1940-1948	Calhoun City
Calhoun	Dennis Murphree	D	1911–1924	Pittsboro
Carroll	George I. Redditt	D	1916–1920	McCarley
Carroll	Lafayette J. Lott	D	1916–1920	Grenada
Chickasaw	Irvin Abernathy	D	1916-1925	Okolona
Chickasaw	Eugene Verrell	D	1916-1920	Houston
Choctaw	Carlton A. Lindsey	D	1908-1920; 1928-1932	Eupora
Claiborne	Talbert Luster	D	1912-1920	Utica
Clarke	Howard L. Miller	D	1916-1920	Quitman
Clay	Barney S. Semmelman (1916) (Note: Resigned to fight in World War I)	D	1916-1917	West Point
Clay	J. A. McArthur (1918)		1917-1920	West Point
Clay	Frank B. Stephens	D	1916-1920	West Point
Coahoma	Oscar G. Johnston	D	1908-1920	Clarksdale
Coahoma	Robert L. Ralston	D	1916-1920	Coahoma
Copiah	John A. Smylie	D	1916-1920	Crystal Springs
Copiah	Benjamin King	D	1916-1920	Hazlehurst
Copiah	George W. Russell	D	1916-1924	Hazlehurst
Covington	Martin Sennet Conner	D	1916-1924	Seminary
DeSoto	Dalton F. Warren	D	1916-1920	Olive Branch
DeSoto	John C. Lauderdale	D	1916-1920	Bright
Forrest	Elisha A. Anderson	D	1912-	Hattiesburg
Franklin	Charles A. Everett	D	1916-1920	Monroe
George	Luther W. Maples	D	1916-1920	Clarence
Greene	William I. McLain	D	1916-1920	Richton
Grenada	William Aylmer Winter	D	1916-1924	Grenada
Hancock	Robert L. Genin	D	1912-1920; 1926-1928	Bay St. Louis
Harrison	Ernest E. O'Neal	D	1916-	Saucier
Hinds	Verell P. Ferguson	D	1912-1923	Learned
Hinds	Edward H. Green	D	1916-	Jackson
Hinds	John Sivley Rhodes	D	1916-	Jackson
Holmes	Thomas G. Stephenson	D	1912-	Lexington
Holmes	Leland N. White	D	1916-	Lexington
Holmes	Henry H. Johnson	D	1916-	Lexington
Issaquena	Robert E. Foster	D	1912-1931	Shiloh
Itawamba	William C. Gray	D	1916-	Fulton
Jackson	William R. David	D	1916-	Carterville
Jasper	Henry Lloyd Finch	D	1916-1924	Heidelberg
Jefferson	William M. Darden	D	1912-	McNair
Jefferson Davis	Oliver C. Luper	D	1916-	Prentiss
Jones	James H. Bush	D	1912-	Laurel
Kemper	Joseph J. Daniel	D	1916-	DeKalb
Kemper	Edmund J. Irby	D	1916-	Scooba
Lafayette	David F. Hoyle	D	1916-	Paris
Lafayette	Henry L. Davis	D	1916-1920; 1924-1928	Tula
Lamar	John A. Yeager	D	1916-1932	Lumberton
Lauderdale	Thomas L. Bailey	D	1916-1940	Meridian
Lauderdale	Willis M. Taylor	D	1916-1920	Meridian
Lauderdale	Jesse D. Bounds	D	1916-1920; 1928-1932	Bailey
Lawrence	Charles E. Gibson	D	1916-	Monticello
Leake	Martin M. Miller	D	1916-1920	Edinburg
Lee	Frank L. Kincannon	D	1916-	Tupelo
Lee	James S. Howerton	D	1912-	Baldwyn
Leflore	William S. Barry	D	1888-1892; 1916-1920	Greenwood
Lincoln	John F. Cole	D	1916-	Bogue Chitto
Lowndes	John F. Frierson	D	1916-	Columbus
Lowndes	Dabney L. Ervin	D	1912-	Columbus
Lowndes	Joseph R. Thomas	D	1916-	Columbus
Madison	John B. Dendy	D	1912-	Pickens
Madison	Tip Ray	D	1916-	Canton
Marion	Ethelbert I. Singley	I	1916-1920	Columbia
Marshall	William W. Stamps	D	1916-	Colliersville, TN
Marshall	Wilfred I. Spears	D	1916-	Byhalia
Marshall	John A. Hardin	D	1916-	Potts Camp
Monroe	William H. Kolb	D	1916-	Aberdeen
Monroe	William L. C. Bailey	D	1916-	Aberdeen
Monroe	Arna A. Tubb	D	1916-	Amory
Montgomery	Elijah M. Thompson	D	1912-	Winona
Neshoba	Thomas B. Williams	D	1916-	Philadelphia
Newton	Nathan M. Everett	D	1912-	Hickory
Newton	Bennie W. Dearing	D	1916-	Newton
Noxubee	Thomas W. Brame	D	1912-	Macon
Noxubee	Clinton E. Dorroh	D	1916-	Macon
Noxubee	Prince DeWitt Hubbard	D	1916-	Shuqualak
Oktibbeha	Joseph S. Rice	D	1916-	Starkville
Oktibbeha	John D. Greene Jr.	D	1916-	Sturgis
Panola	Albert Sidney Kyle	D	1900-1912; 1916-	Batesville
Panola	Felix H. Nelson	D	1916-	Pope
Panola	Robert T. Keys	D	1916-	Sardis
Pearl River	Jess E. Stockstill	D	1916-	Picayune
Perry	Gabriel D. Draughn	D	1916-	New Augusta
Pike	Joseph E. Norwood	D	1916-	Magnolia
Pike	Fenelon D. Hewitt	D	1916-	McComb
Pontotoc	William T. Stegall	D	1896-	Pontotoc
Pontotoc	Frank Roberson	D	1916-1917	Pontotoc
Pontotoc	Thomas J. Wingo	D	1917-	Toccopola
Prentiss	Robert E. L. Sutherland	D	1916-	Wheeler
Prentiss	Bartho L. Breedlove	D	1916-	Booneville
Quitman	Ula B. Ross	D	1916-1920	Lambert
Rankin	William E. McIntyre	D	1916-	Brandon
Rankin	Richard H. Watts	D	1916-	Pelahatchie
Scott	William L. Weems	D		Sun
Sharkey	Samuel B. Alexander	D	1916-	Rolling Fork
Simpson	William F. Stroud	D	1916-	Pinola
Smith	Henry C. Thornton	D	1916-	Taylorville
Stone	A. Batson	D	1916-1920	
Sunflower	Arthur B. Clark	D	1916-1924	Indianola
Tallahatchie	Rowe Hays	D	1916-	Sumner
Tate	William J. East	D	1896-1900; 1904-1908; 1916–1920	Senatobia
Tate	Servetus L. Crockett	D	1916-	Tyro
Tippah	William R. Wildman	D	1916-	Ripley
Tishomingo	James R. Mann	D	1916-	Iuka
Tunica	James M. Anderson	D	1916-	Tunica
Union	John N. Magill	D	1916-	Bethany
Union	Sam J. Purvis	D	1916-	Blue Springs
Walthall	William W. Pope	D		Tylertown
Warren	Thomas R. Foster	D	1902-1912; 1916-	Vicksburg
Warren	George R. Hawkins	D	1908-1912; 1916-	Vicksburg
Warren	Robert L. C. Barret	D	1916-	Vicksburg
Washington	Alfred H. Stone	D	1916-1924	Dunleith Plantation
Washington	Alexander G. Paxton	D	1916-	Greenville
Washington	Walter S. Knotts	D	1916-	Belzoni
Wayne	Grover C. Clark	D	1916-	Heidelberg
Webster	Solon S. Gore	D	1916-	Embry
Wilkinson	James R. Hutcheson	D	1916-	Centerville
Wilkinson	C. T. Netterville, Jr.	D	1916-	Wilkinson
Winston	Frank McGehee Glenn	D	1916-	Noxapater
Yalobusha	George E. Denley	D	1916-	Coffeeville
Yalobusha	William A. Nolen	D	1916-	Water Valley
Yazoo	Benjamin F. Roberts	D	1916-	Satartia
Yazoo	Patrick C. Meagher	D	1916-1920	Yazoo City
Yazoo	Excell Coody	D	1916-	Phoenix
Franklin & Lincoln	Fred A. Wright	D	1916-	Lucien
Tippah & Benton	Frederick B. Smith	D	1916-	Ripley
Claiborne & Jefferson	Samuel R. Young	D	1916-	Pattison
Clarke & Jasper	William L. West	D	1916-	Vossburg
Grenada & Montgomery	William H. Dyre	D	1916-1920	Winona
Leake & Winston	John C. Holton	D	1916-	Louisville
Harrison & Jackson	John M. Hairston	D	1916-	Gulfport
Lee & Itawamba	Robert S. Sheffield	D	1916-	Dorsey
Yazoo & Hinds	Dr. Virgil M. Perry	D	1916-	Satartia
Yazoo & Hinds	R. S. Bowman	D	1916-	Benton
