= John Lawrence Hebron Jr. =

American lawyer and politician (1864–1945)

President pro tempore of the Mississippi State Senate
- In office January 1908 – January 1912
- Preceded by: E. H. Moore
- Succeeded by: Albert C. Anderson

Member of the Mississippi State Senate from the 29th district
- In office January 1928 – January 1936 Serving with P. W. Allen (1932–1936); L. G. North (1928–1932)
- Preceded by: A. L. Marshall; Walton Shields
- Succeeded by: J. A. Lake Jr. P. W. Allen
- In office January 1904 – January 1912 Serving with Thomas R. Baird (1908–1912); W. W. Stone (1904–1908)
- Preceded by: Robert B. Campbell; William B. Martin
- Succeeded by: V. B. Boddie; N. W. Sumrall

Personal details
- Born: July 6, 1864 Vicksburg, Mississippi, U.S.
- Died: March 17, 1945 (aged 80) Jackson, Mississippi, U.S.
- Party: Democratic
- Children: 3

John Lawrence Hebron Jr. (July 6, 1864 – March 17, 1945) was an American lawyer and Democratic Party politician who represented Washington County in the Mississippi State Senate from 1904 to 1912 and from 1928 to 1936 and was its President Pro Tempore from 1908 to 1912.

== Biography ==
John Lawrence Hebron Jr. was born on July 6, 1864, at the Bovina Plantation near Vicksburg, Mississippi. He was the son of John Hebron Sr., who became a Mississippi state senator, and his wife, Ellen (Ellington) Hebron, a poet. Hebron Jr. attended Mississippi College from 1877 to 1879. He then entered the University of Mississippi in 1881 and received a Freshman Medal in declamation from there in 1883. He graduated from "several of the literary departments" in June 1885. Hebron graduated the University of Mississippi School of Law in 1887, receiving a L.L.B. degree. In July 1887, Hebron began practicing law in Leland, Mississippi.

== Political career ==
Hebron was elected the County Attorney for Washington County, Mississippi and served from January 1896 to January 1900. In August 1903, Hebron was elected to be the Chairman of Washington County's Democratic Executive Committee. On November 3, 1903, Hebron was elected to represent the 29th District as a Democrat in the Mississippi State Senate for the 1904–1908 session. During this term, Hebron was a member of the Senate's Levees; Temperance; Railroads & Franchises; Printing; and Military Committees. In January 1904, Governor J. K. Vardaman appointed Hebron to the Board of Trustees of the University of Mississippi. In March 1906, Hebron was appointed to the office of Washington County's Levee Commissioner. In July 1906, he was appointed to be the President of the Board of Mississippi Levee Commissioners.

Hebron was re-elected to the Senate on November 5, 1907, for the 1908–1912 term. During this term, Hebron served as the Senate's president pro Tempore. He was also the Chairman of the Senate's Levees Committee, and served on the following committees: Rules, Finance, and Unfinished Business. After his term ended at the start of 1912, he was succeeded in the Senate by V. B. Boddie and N. W. Sumrall.

In 1927, Hebron was once again re-elected to represent the 29th District in the Senate for the 1928–1932 term. During this term, Hebron was the Chairman of the Fees and Salaries Committee, and also was a member of the following committees: Constitution; County Affairs; Levees; Railroads & Franchises; and Temperance. In 1931, Hebron was re-elected to the Senate for the 1932–1936 term. He was succeeded in the Senate by J. A. Lake Jr. and P. W. Allen.

Hebron died at the Jackson Infirmary on March 17, 1945, after a long illness. He was survived by two of his children: Corrine and Dean.

== Personal life ==
Hebron was a member of Delta Psi. He was a Presbyterian. Hebron married Lula Dean on July 6, 1893. They had three children: Corrine, Dean, and Cora. Corinne married Joseph Henry Morris in 1918. Cora was married to John Moore.
