= King Bee =

King Bee and Kingbee may refer to:

- Queen bee
- King Bees, American, mid-1960s
- King Bee (band), American band
- The Kingbees, American rockabilly band formed by Jamie James
- King Bee (album), a 1981 blues album by Muddy Waters
- Kingbee, Missouri, a ghost town in the United States
- King-Bee Films, an American silent film era production company
- "I'm a King Bee", a song composed by Slim Harpo, and covered by Muddy Waters, The Rolling Stones and Pink Floyd
- Kingbee, Nickname for the Vietnam Air Force Sikorsky H-34 helicopter

== See also ==
- Bee King (1866-1949), politician in Mississippi
