= Senator Thompson =

Senator Thompson may refer to:

== Members of the United States Senate ==
- Fountain L. Thompson (1854–1942), U.S. Senator from North Dakota from 1909 to 1910
- Fred Thompson (1942–2015), U.S. Senator from Tennessee from 1994 to 2003
- John Burton Thompson (1810–1874), U.S. Senator from Kentucky from 1853 to 1859
- Thomas W. Thompson (1766–1821), U.S. Senator from New Hampshire from 1814 to 1817
- William Henry Thompson (1853–1937), U.S. Senator from Nebraska from 1933 to 1934
- William Howard Thompson (1871–1928), U.S. Senator from Kansas from 1913 to 1919

== United States state senate members ==
=== Alabama State Senate ===
- C. W. Thompson (1860–1904)

=== Arizona State Senate ===
- T. P. Thompson (Arizona politician) (fl. 1910s)

=== Arkansas State Senate ===
- J. Ed Thompson (1886–1976)
- Robert F. Thompson (born 1971)

=== California State Senate ===
- Mike Thompson (born 1951)

=== Colorado State Senate ===
- Newton W. Thompson (1865–1936)

=== Florida State Senate ===
- Geraldine Thompson (1948–2025)

=== Georgia State Senate ===
- Bruce Thompson (Georgia politician) (1965–2024)
- Curt Thompson (born 1968)
- Fletcher Thompson (1925–2022)
- Steve Thompson (Georgia politician) (born 1950)
- Wiley Thompson (1781–1835)

=== Illinois State Senate ===
- Wallace Thompson (1896–1952)

=== Indiana State Senate ===
- Richard Allen Thompson (1934–2024)
- Richard W. Thompson (1809–1900)

=== Iowa State Senate ===
- John W. Thompson (Iowa politician) (1823–1883)
- William George Thompson (1830–1911)

=== Kansas State Senate ===
- Charles W. Thompson (Kansas politician) (1867–1950)
- Mike Thompson (Kansas politician, born 1957) (born 1957)

=== Louisiana State Senate ===
- Francis C. Thompson (born 1941)

=== Massachusetts State Senate ===
- Benjamin Thompson (politician) (1798–1852)

=== Michigan State Senate ===
- William G. Thompson (1840–1904)

=== Minnesota State Senate ===
- Clark W. Thompson (Minnesota politician) (1825–1885)
- Dave Thompson (Minnesota politician) (born 1961)

=== Mississippi State Senate ===
- Charles E. Thompson (1889–1986)
- Mike Thompson (Mississippi politician) (born 1976)
- Richard E. Thompson (1871–1928)

=== Nebraska State Senate ===
- Dudley E. Thompson (1909–1981)
- Nancy Thompson (politician) (born 1947)

=== New Jersey State Senate ===
- Samuel D. Thompson (born 1935)

=== New York State Senate ===
- Antoine Thompson (born 1970)
- George F. Thompson (1870–1948)
- George L. Thompson (1864–1941)
- James A. Thompson (New York politician) (1873–1923)
- James G. Thompson (New York politician) (1829–1892)
- William C. Thompson (New York judge) (1924–2018)

=== North Carolina State Senate ===
- Cyrus Thompson (1855–1930)
- William Thompson (North Carolina politician) (1772–1802)

=== Oklahoma State Senate ===
- Joseph B. Thompson (1871–1919)
- Kristen Thompson (born 1984/85)
- Roger Thompson (politician) (born 1956/57)

=== Oregon State Senate ===
- David P. Thompson (1834–1901)
- W. Lair Thompson (1880–1940)

=== Pennsylvania State Senate ===
- Joseph H. Thompson (1871–1928)
- Robert J. Thompson (1937–2006)

=== Rhode Island State Senate ===
- Brian Thompson (politician) (born 1981)

=== Vermont State Senate ===
- Laforrest H. Thompson (1848–1900)

=== Virginia State Senate ===
- Robert A. Thompson (1805–1876)
- William Carrington Thompson (1915–2011)

=== Washington State Senate ===
- Alan Thompson (Washington politician) (1927–2019)
- L. F. Thompson (1827–1894)

=== Wisconsin State Senate ===
- Carl W. Thompson (1914–2002)

== See also ==
- Senator Thomson (disambiguation)
