= John Cassels =

John Cassels may refer to:

- J. W. S. Cassels (John William Scott Cassels), British mathematician
- John F. Cassels, member of the Mississippi House of Representatives
- Sir John Cassels (civil servant), English civil servant and educationalist
