= Walter Green =

Walter Green may refer to:

- Walter Green (MP for Bridgnorth), in 1406/07, MP for Bridgnorth (UK Parliament constituency)
- Walter Green (died 1456), MP for Middlesex (UK Parliament constituency)
- Walter Green (politician) (1878–1958), British politician, MP for Deptford 1935-1945
- Walter G. Green (1892–1962), member of the Mississippi House of Representatives
- J. Walter Green (born 1964), American attorney
- Wally Green (1918–2006), international motorcycle speedway rider
- Wally Green (table tennis), table tennis player

== See also ==
- Walter Greene (disambiguation)
