= Howard Miller =

Howard Miller may refer to:

- Howard Miller (minister) (1894–1948), minister and general superintendent in the Church of the Nazarene
- Howard Shultz Miller (1879–1970), U.S. Representative from Kansas
- Howard Lee Miller (1888-1977), member of the Mississippi House of Representatives
- Howard Miller Clock Company
- J. Howard Miller, the artist who made the We Can Do It! poster
