= Robert Ralston =

Robert Ralston may refer to:

- Robert Ralston (philanthropist) (1761–1836), American merchant and philanthropist
- Robert L. Ralston (1860–1926), member of the Mississippi House of Representatives
- Bob Ralston (1938–2025), American pianist and organist
