= Senator Wade =

Senator Wade may refer to:

== Members of the United States Senate ==
- Benjamin Wade (1800–1878), U.S. senator from Ohio

== United States state senate members ==
- Battaille H. Wade (1856–1926), Mississippi State Senate
- Clifton Wade (1910–1974), Arkansas State Senate
- Decius Wade (1835–1905), Montana State Senate
- George N. Wade (1893–1974), Pennsylvania State Senate
- Harrie Wade (1905–1964), Australian senator from Victoria
- Sherman W. Wade (1895–1969) Wisconsin State Senate
- Trudy Wade (born 1951), North Carolina State Senate
