= Senator Stubblefield =

Senator Stubblefield may refer to:

- Gary Stubblefield (1951–2025), Arkansas State Senate
- Peter Stubblefield (1888–1966), Mississippi State Senate

== See also ==
- Senator Stubbs (disambiguation)
