= John Smylie =

John Smylie may refer to:

- John Sheridan Smylie, American Episcopal bishop
- John A. Smylie, member of the Mississippi House of Representatives
