= Senator Thomson =

Senator Thomson may refer to:

- Edward Hughes Thomson (1810–1886), Michigan State Senate
- John Renshaw Thomson (1800–1862), U.S. Senator from New Jersey from 1853 to 1862
- John Thomson (Ohio politician) (1780–1852), Ohio State Senate
- Manlius Valerius Thomson (1802–1850), Kentucky State Senate

== See also ==
- Senator Thompson (disambiguation)
- Hugh French Thomason (1826–1893), Arkansas State Senate
- Chuck Thomsen (born 1957), Oregon State Senate
