= John C. Lauderdale =

American politician

Member of the Mississippi Senate from the 35th district
- In office January 1940 – January 1944
- Preceded by: C. P. Winn
- Succeeded by: Carl C. Allen

Member of the Mississippi House of Representatives from the DeSoto County district
- In office January 1916 – January 1920 Serving with Dalton F. Warren

Personal details
- Born: September 20, 1872 Lewisburg, Mississippi
- Died: June 4, 1951 (aged 78) Hernando, Mississippi
- Party: Democrat

John Cobb Lauderdale (September 20, 1872 - June 4, 1951) was an American teacher, farmer, and Democratic politician. He was a member of the Mississippi legislature in the early-to-mid 20th century.

== Biography ==
John Cobb Lauderdale was born in Lewisburg, Mississippi, on September 20, 1872. He was the son of Eli Benton Lauderdale and Leonora (Cobb) Lauderdale. He was educated in the schools of DeSoto County, Mississippi. He became a teacher and a farmer. He was elected to represent DeSoto County as a Democrat in the Mississippi House of Representatives in 1915 and served from 1916 to 1920. He represented Mississippi's 35th senatorial district in the Mississippi Senate from 1940 to 1944. Lauderdale died on June 4, 1951, at his home in Hernando, Mississippi.
