= Hazlewood Power Farish =

Mississippi politician

Member of the Mississippi State Senate from the 20th district
- In office January 1908 – January 1912

Personal details
- Born: September 15, 1880 Mayersville, MS
- Died: January 4, 1958 (aged 77) Des Moines, IA
- Party: Democrat

Hazlewood Power Farish (September 15, 1880 – January 4, 1958) was a Democratic Mississippi state senator, representing the 20th district, which composed of Issaquena and Sharkey counties, from 1908 to 1912.

== Biography ==
Hazlewood Power Farish was born on September 15, 1880, in Mayersville, Mississippi. He was the son of Confederate Army veteran Robert Davis Farish and his wife, Carolyn Harrison (Power) Farish. Hazlewood attended the public schools of Issaquena County. In 1897, he was the Lieutenant of the First Regiment of the Mississippi National Guard. He graduated from the University of Mississippi Law School with a L.L.B. in 1899. He was admitted to the bar the same year and started practicing law. Then, he was an attorney in the Board of Supervisors of Issaquena County. He was elected to represent the 20th district, which was composed of Issaquena and Sharkey Counties, of the Mississippi State Senate, as a Democrat, in 1907 for the 1908 to 1912 term. In 1919, he was partners in a law firm with fellow former state senator Van Buren Boddie. He died on January 4, 1958, in Des Moines, Iowa.

== Personal life ==
Farish was a member of the Episcopalian Church. He was a member of the Knights of Pythias. Farish married Mildred Henrietta Lillard on November 14, 1906 in New Orleans, Louisiana. Mildred died on June 9, 1907.
