= Southaven High School =

Public school in Mississippi, United States

- Southaven High School, May 2007

Location
- 735 Rasco Road; Southaven, Mississippi 38671; United States; 34°58′35″N 90°00′21″W

Information
- Type: Public secondary
- Established: 1971
- School district: DeSoto County School District
- CEEB code: 252823
- Principal: Adam Sikes
- Teaching staff: 112.01 (FTE)
- Grades: 9–12
- Enrollment: 1,825 (2023-2024)
- Student to teacher ratio: 16.29
- Colors: Orange and Blue
- Team name: Chargers
- Rival: DeSoto Central High School
- Accreditation: Southern Association of Colleges and Schools
- Publication: Mélange (Literary Magazine)
- Yearbook: Charger Yearbook
- Website: Southaven High School

The former High School, now Southaven Middle School

Southaven High School is a suburban public high school located in Southaven, Mississippi, United States. It opened in the fall of 1971, when construction was completed enough so that students could start the first classes. The original school taught 6th through 12th.

== History ==
Construction of Southaven High school was completed in 1972. The original building added a junior high in 1996. In 2004, the citizens of Southaven voted to build a new high school (where it is currently located) and make the original building a middle school. The new building was completed in the fall of 2006, and classes started at the new building in 2007.

== Athletics ==
=== Teams ===
Southaven High School's athletic teams are nicknamed the Chargers and the school's colors are blue and orange. Southaven High, as a member of the Mississippi High School Activities Association(MHSAA), and classified as a 7A School in terms of enrollment, participates in the following sports:

- Archery (Co-ed)
- Baseball (Boys)
- Basketball (Co-ed)
- Bowling (Co-ed)
- Cheer (Co-ed)
- Color guard (Co-ed)
- Football (Boys)
- Golf (Co-ed)
- Marching band (Co-ed)
- Powerlifting (Co-ed)
- Soccer (Co-ed)
- Softball (Girls)
- Swimming (Co-ed)
- Tennis (Co-ed)
- Track and field (Co-ed)
- Volleyball (Girls)
- Winter guard (Co-ed)

== Performing and Visual Arts ==
The Southaven High School Theatre program performs a play during the fall and a musical during the spring. The other performing and visual arts courses offered are Music Appreciation, AP Studio Art, AP Art History, Ceramics, Photography, and General Art.

== Clubs and organizations ==
- Anime Club
- Band
- Beta Club
- Book Club
- Choir
- Debate Club
- Diamond Girls
- Fellowship of Christian Athletes
- Fellowship of Christian Students
- Government Club
- International Thespian Society
- Knowledge Bowl
- Mayor's Youth Council
- National Art Honor Society
- National Honors Society
- Photography Club
- Rho Kappa
- Superintendent's Youth Leadership Council
- Student Council

== Demographics ==
As of the class of 2022- 2023, Southaven High school has 1,758 students, 55% of the students are black, 28% are White, 9% are Hispanic, 2% are Asian, and 6% are multiracial.

== Notable alumni ==
- Kahlil Benson, professional football player in the NFL for the Kansas City Chiefs, 2026 College Football Playoff national champion with the Indiana Hoosiers
- Carl Byrum, former professional football player in the NFL for the Buffalo Bills, Houston Oilers, and New York Jets
- Terence Davis, professional basketball player, formerly in the NBA for the Toronto Raptors and Sacramento Kings
- Brandin Echols, professional football player in the NFL for the Pittsburgh Steelers
- John Grisham, author
- Tazé Moore, professional basketball player, formerly in the NBA for the Portland Trail Blazers
- Mackenzie Morgan, professional wrestler signed to the National Wrestling Alliance
- Caleb Offord, professional football player in the NFL for the Las Vegas Raiders
- Reagan Rust, former professional hockey player in the PWHPA
- Terry Williams, former professional football player
