= Troy, Mississippi =

- Unincorporated community
- Troy's position in Mississippi
- Coordinates: 34°07′08″N 88°53′06″W
- Country: United States
- State: Mississippi
- County: Pontotoc
- Elevation: 505 ft (154 m)
- Time zone: UTC-6 (Central (CST))
  - Summer (DST): UTC-5 (CDT)
- GNIS feature ID: 695008

Troy is an unincorporated community in Pontotoc County, Mississippi, around the intersection of Mississippi Highway 41 and County Road 82, roughly two miles west of the Natchez Trace Parkway, due west of Shannon.

== History ==
Troy was established in the 1830s at a site about two miles north of its present coordinates (later referred to as Old Troy), and moved to its current location in 1881. In the late 1800s, this was the site of Troy Normal College, which at times was also known as Mississippi Normal College. The college was founded by professor H.B. Abernethy in 1882. but moved to Houston in 1888. Troy is also the site of a Civil War Union Cemetery containing several unmarked graves.

== Notable people ==
- Irvin Abernathy, member of the Mississippi House of Representatives from 1916 to 1925
- DeVan Dallas, member of the Mississippi House of Representatives from 1964 to 1976
- John Longest, member of the Mississippi House of Representatives from 1900 to 1902
