= DeVan Dallas =

American politician (1926–2016)

Edward DeVan Dallas

Member of the Mississippi House of Representatives from the 6th district
- In office 1964–1976

Personal details
- Born: DeVan Dallas; March 4, 1926 Troy, Mississippi, U.S.
- Died: November 4, 2016 (aged 90) Pontotoc, Mississippi
- Party: Democratic
- Children: 3
- Occupation: Automobile and farm equipment dealer

DeVan "Van" Dallas (March 4, 1926 – November 4, 2016) was an American politician in the state of Mississippi. He served in the Mississippi House of Representatives from 1964 to 1976. Dallas was an automobile and farm equipment dealer. He attended Troy Grammar School and Pontotoc High School. Dallas served in the United States Navy from 1944 to 1946, partaking in World War II. From 1972 to 1976, he sat on the Mississippi State Sovereignty Commission, among other various boards.
