= Lewisburg, Mississippi =

- Unincorporated community
- Location within Mississippi Location within the United States
- Coordinates: 34°51′43″N 89°50′00″W
- Country: United States
- State: Mississippi
- County: Desoto
- Elevation: 125 ft (38 m)
- Time zone: UTC-6 (Central (CST))
  - Summer (DST): UTC-5 (CDT)
- ZIP code: 38611, 38654
- Area code: 662
- GNIS feature ID: 690920

Lewisburg is an unincorporated community located in DeSoto County, Mississippi, United States. Lewisburg is approximately 5 miles (8.0 km) south of Olive Branch and approximately 12 miles (19 km) north of Independence along Mississippi Highway 305.

A post office began operation under the name Lewisburg in 1872.

== Education ==
Lewisburg is served by the DeSoto County School District

Lewisburg Primary School serves students from Kindergarten to 1st grade. Lewisburg Elementary School serves students grades 2-3. Lewisburg Intermediate School serves grades 4-5. Lewisburg Middle School serves grades 6-8, and Lewisburg High School serves grades 9-12.

== Notable person ==
- John C. Lauderdale, member of the Mississippi House of Representatives from 1916 to 1920 and the Mississippi Senate from 1940 to 1944
