= John Longest =

American politician

John Isbell Longest (April 24, 1860 – March 21, 1933) was a teacher, farmer and Democratic legislator from Troy, Mississippi.

Longest was born on April 24, 1860, in Lee County, the son of Ruffin Longest and Sarah Louis (Thompson) Longest. His paternal ancestors came from Virginia; his great-grandfather, James Longest, served in the American Revolutionary War; the maternal line was Scotch-Irish, and settled in Alabama. Mr. Longest attended country schools assiduously in youth, a paternal order always keeping him at his desk throughout the ten months' session; he entered and graduated from Iuka Normal Institute in 1889, with an A.M. degree.

He taught school for ten years. On September 5. 1893 he married Leah Thompson (daughter of James Thomas and Carrie Thompson) in her home town of Houlka, Mississippi. Her family came from South Carolina.

In 1899 he became a farmer in Pontotoc County.

== Legislative service ==
He served as a member of the State Legislature in 1900–1902, and was again elected November 5, 1907, as a Democrat.

== Personal life ==
Longest was a member of the Missionary Baptist Church and a Freemason.
