= W. W. Stone =

Former American politician

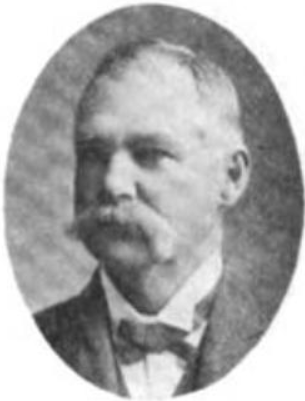
- c. 1904

18th State Auditor of Mississippi
- In office January 1886 – January 1896
- Governor: Robert Lowry; John Marshall Stone
- Preceded by: Sylvester Gwin
- Succeeded by: W. D. Holder

Member of the Mississippi State Senate from the 29th district
- In office January 1904 – January 1908 Serving with John L. Hebron Jr.

Member of the Mississippi House of Representatives from the Washington County district
- In office January 3, 1882 – January 1884

Personal details
- Born: July 20, 1840 Boone County, Missouri, U.S.
- Died: June 5, 1930 (aged 89) Greenville, Mississippi, U.S.
- Party: Democratic
- Children: 4, including Alfred

Walter Wilson Stone (July 20, 1840 – June 5, 1930) was an American politician. He was the 18th State Auditor of Mississippi, serving from 1886 to 1896. He also served in both houses of the Mississippi Legislature.

== Early life ==
Walter Wilson Stone was born on July 20, 1840, in Boone County, Missouri. He was the fifth of 12 children of Caleb S. Stone and Ann Wilson. Wilson attended a log cabin school and in 1854 entered the University of Missouri, graduating in 1859. He then served as Professor of Greek and Latin at that college. In 1861 he joined the Confederate Army, as he sympathized with the South. In December 1862 he joined the army of General Thomas C. Hindman, where he served as lieutenant and then captain. He served in the Battles of Prairie Grove, Mansfield, and Pleasant Hill. Stone was part of the force that surrendered at Shreveport in 1865.

== Career ==
Stone moved to Mississippi in 1866. He began operating a store in Greenville and then turned to planting. By 1891 he had cleared 2500 acres of land and owned 6000.

In 1877, Stone served as Justice of the Peace. In 1881, Stone was elected to represent Washington County as a Democrat in the Mississippi House of Representatives for the 1882 session. In 1885, Stone was elected State Auditor of Mississippi. In 1889, he was re-elected for a term that expired in 1896.

On November 3, 1903, Stone was elected to represent the 29th District (Washington County) in the Mississippi State Senate for the 1904-1908 term.

== Personal life and death ==
Stone was a member of the Knights of Honor, the Freemasons, and the Christian Church. He married Eleanor Holt on October 2, 1869, in New Orleans. They had nine children, of whom five survived: Alfred Holt, Annie, Lilian, Eleanor, and Aimee. Stone died at Greenville on June 5, 1930.
