= Lewisburg High School =

Location
- 1755 Craft Road; Olive Branch, MS 38654; United States
- Coordinates: 34.8738°N 89.8684°W

Information
- Established: Autumn 2006
- School district: DeSoto County School District
- Principal: Kris Perkins
- Teaching staff: 77.48 (FTE)
- Grades: 9–12
- Enrollment: 1,286 (2023-2024)
- Average class size: 20–30
- Student to teacher ratio: 16.60
- Colors: Red and Navy
- Mascot: Pat the Patriot
- Nickname: The Children of the Corn
- Team name: Patriots
- Website: lhs.desotocountyschools.org

Lewisburg High School is a suburban public high school located in Lewisburg, Mississippi, United States (with an Olive Branch postal address). It opened in the fall of 2006, with there being no graduating class for the first two years. Its mascot is the Patriot, and its school colors are red and navy. It is operated by the DeSoto County School District.

== History ==
In 2006, Lewisburg High School opened under the direction of Principal James Brady. The school opened with few extra-curricular activities to offer. The first graduating class was in 2009, a few years later. A population boom hit the area in 2012, with the number of enrolled students rising to 691 students. In 2013, Principal Brady retired and was replaced by the principal at the middle school, Chris Fleming.

== Academics ==
Lewisburg offers 12 Advanced Placement academic courses, as well as 6 Honors Courses. It also offers the National Honor Society, Mu Alpha Theta, a Beta Club, the Spanish National Honor Society, National English Honor Society, International Thespian Society, and German National Honor Society.

== Athletics ==
The sports Lewisburg has to offer are as follows:

- Archery (Co-ed)
- Baseball (Boys)
- Bowling (Co-ed)
- Basketball (Co-ed)
- Cheerleading (Co-ed)
- Cross Country Running (Co-ed)
- Dance (Girls)
- Football (Boys)
- Golf (Co-ed)
- Powerlifting (Co-ed)
- Soccer (Co-ed)
- Softball (Girls)
- Swimming (Co-ed)
- Tennis (Co-ed)
- Track & Field (Co-ed)
- Volleyball (Girls)
- Wrestling (Co-ed)
- Sparkles

== Performing arts ==
- The Lewisburg High School Choral Department has been in operation since 2008.
- The Lewisburg High School Drama Department has performed many productions, including Through The Storybook (2011), The Wizard of Oz (2013), Rodgers and Hammerstein's Cinderella (2014), and Beauty and the Beast (2016). It has been in operation since 2009.

== Clubs and organizations ==
- Art Club
- Band
- Beta Club
- Choir
- Diamond Girls
- Explorer's Club
- Fellowship of Christian Athletes
- Fellowship of Christian Students
- Interact Club
- International Thespian Society
- Knowledge Bowl
- Mu Alpha Theta
- National Honors Society
- SADD
- Science Club
- Senior Class
- Sign Language Club
- Spanish Club
- Speech/Debate Club
- Student Council
- Yearbook
- Youth Health Council
