= DeSoto Central High School =

Location
- 2911 Central Parkway; Southaven, Mississippi 38672; United States; 34.9403°N 89.9390°W

Information
- Type: Public high school
- Established: 1999
- School district: DeSoto County School District
- Principal: Shane Jones
- Teaching staff: 112.36 (FTE)
- Grades: 9–12
- Enrollment: 2,004 (2024-2025)
- Student to teacher ratio: 17.84
- Colors: Purple and Gold
- Mascot: Jaggie the Jaguar
- Team name: Jaguars
- Rival: Southaven High School
- Accreditation: Southern Association of Colleges and Schools
- Website: dch.desotocountyschools.org

DeSoto Central High School is a suburban public high school in Southaven, Mississippi, United States. It is a part of the DeSoto County School District and serves students from Southaven, Olive Branch, and Nesbit.

== History ==
DeSoto Central High School opened in August 1999 as a Kindergarten-6th grade campus in the current DeSoto Central Middle School Building to relieve crowding at Southaven High School and Olive Branch High School. DeSoto Central received a new high school building in August 2003. The first senior class graduated in May 2006.

== Athletics ==
=== Teams ===
Desoto Central's athletic teams are nicknamed the Jaguars and the school's colors are purple and gold. DeSoto Central teams compete in the following sports:

- Archery
- Band
- Baseball
- Basketball
- Bowling
- Cheer
- Cross Country
- Dance
- Football
- Golf
- Powerlifting
- Soccer
- Softball
- Swimming
- Tennis
- Track and Field
- Volleyball
- Wrestling

=== State championships ===
- Baseball
  - 2015 Mississippi 6A State Champions
  - 2019 Mississippi 6A State Champions
- Marching Band
  - 2010 Mississippi 6A State Champions
  - 2011 Mississippi 6A State Champions
  - 2021 Mississippi 6A State Champions

== Demographics ==
64.5% of the student population at DeSoto Central High School identify as Caucasian, 28.8% identify as African American, 3.5% identify as Asian, and 3% identify as Hispanic. The student body makeup is 49.25% male and 50.75% female.

== Notable alumni ==
- Blaze Jordan – MLB player for the St. Louis Cardinals
- Austin Riley – MLB player for the Atlanta Braves, 2-time All-Star selection, 2021 World Series champion
- Ricky Stenhouse Jr. – NASCAR Cup Series driver
