= Walter Greene (disambiguation) =

Walter Greene was a composer.

Walter Greene may also refer to:

- Sir Raymond Greene, 2nd Baronet (Walter Raymond Greene), British politician
- Walter S. Greene, American politician
- Walter Greene (multihull designer), multihull sailboat designer and builder

== See also ==
- Walter Massy-Greene
- Walter Green (disambiguation)
