= Scheller A. Miller =

American politician

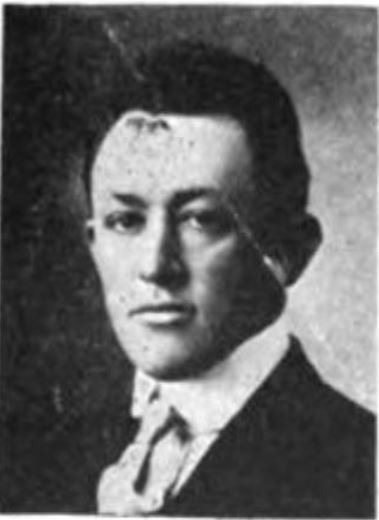
- c. 1917

Member of the Mississippi State Senate from the 24th district
- In office January 1916 – January 1920

Personal details
- Born: June 1, 1885 Una, Mississippi
- Died: January 1925 (aged 39) Memphis, Tennessee
- Party: Democratic

Scheller Alexander Miller (June 1, 1885 - January 1925) was an American Democratic politician. He was a member of the Mississippi State Senate from 1916 to 1920.

== Biography ==
Scheller Alexander Miller was born on June 1, 1885, in Una, Clay County, Mississippi. He was the son of Thomas Wesley Miller and his wife, Jimmie Adrian (Shell) Miller. Miller attended the public schools in his area. He graduated from Mississippi Agricultural & Mechanical College with a B. Sc. degree in 1907. He taught at rural schools for the next three years. He graduated from Cornell University with another degree, and then worked in agriculture. He worked as an agricultural and industrial agent for railroad companies, and then worked for the state of New York in the dairy industry. In November 1915, Miller was elected to represent the 24th District as a Democrat in the Mississippi State Senate for the 1916–1920 term. During his term, Miller fought in World War I. He was a candidate to represent Mississippi's 4th District in the U. S. House of Representatives in 1922. Miller died in January 1925, in a hospital in Memphis, Tennessee.
