= Blaze Jordan =

American baseball player (born 2002)

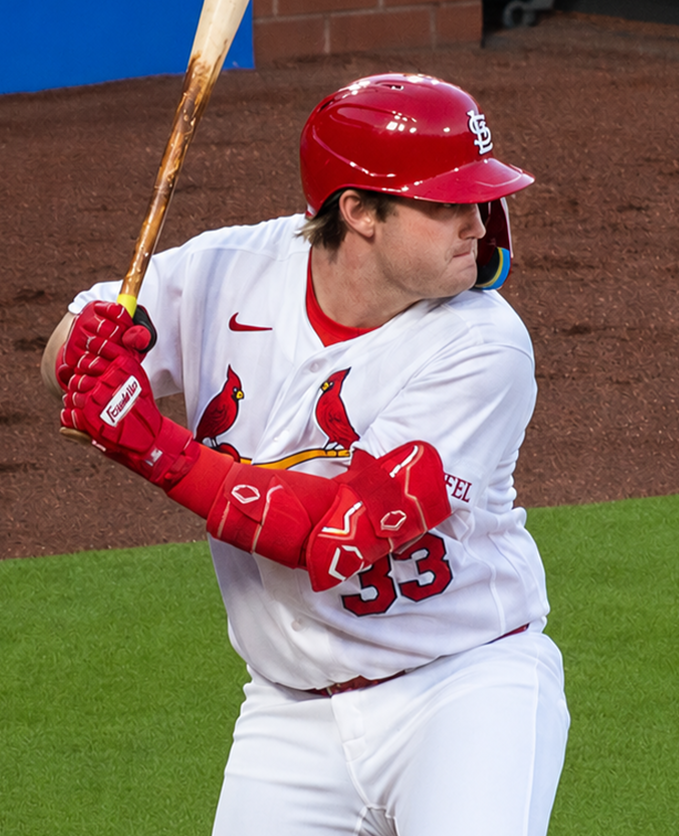
- Jordan with the St.Louis Cardinals in 2026

St. Louis Cardinals – No. 33
- Third baseman / First baseman
- Born: December 19, 2002 (age 23); Southaven, Mississippi, U.S.
- Bats: Right Throws: Right

MLB debut
- June 12, 2026, for the St. Louis Cardinals

MLB statistics (through 2026 season)
- Batting average: .247
- Home runs: 3
- Runs batted in: 28
- Stats at Baseball Reference

Teams
- St. Louis Cardinals (2026–present)

Blaze Jordan (born December 19, 2002) is an American professional baseball third baseman and first baseman for the St. Louis Cardinals of Major League Baseball (MLB). He made his MLB debut in 2026.

== Amateur career ==
Jordan rose to prominence as a child when he went viral after hitting a 395-foot (120 m) home run at Globe Life Park in Arlington at age 11 and a 500-foot (150 m) home run at age 13. In eighth grade, he committed to play college baseball at Mississippi State University. He attended DeSoto Central High School in Southaven, Mississippi.

In 2019, he hit .440 with ten home runs and 46 RBIs. Following the season, he reclassified from the class of 2021 to the class of 2020. That summer, he won the 2019 High School Home Run Derby at Progressive Field, hitting a total of 27 home runs over three rounds. He also played in the Under Armour All-America Baseball Game and the Perfect Game All-American Classic. In 2020, his senior year, he batted .422 with six doubles, five triples and four RBIs before the season was cancelled due to the COVID-19 pandemic; he was named the Gatorade Mississippi Baseball Player of the Year.

== Professional career ==
=== Boston Red Sox ===
Jordan was selected by the Boston Red Sox in the third round (89th overall) of the 2020 Major League Baseball draft. He signed for $1.75 million. Due to the cancellation of the 2020 minor league season, he spent the summer working out and practicing in his home state of Mississippi. Following that summer, he spent time at Fenway South participating in Boston's instructional league. Jordan began the 2021 season in extended spring training before being assigned to the Rookie-level Florida Complex League Red Sox in late June. In early August, after batting .362 with four home runs and seven doubles over 19 games, he was promoted to the Salem Red Sox of the Low-A East. Over nine games with Salem, Jordan hit .250 with two home runs and seven RBI.

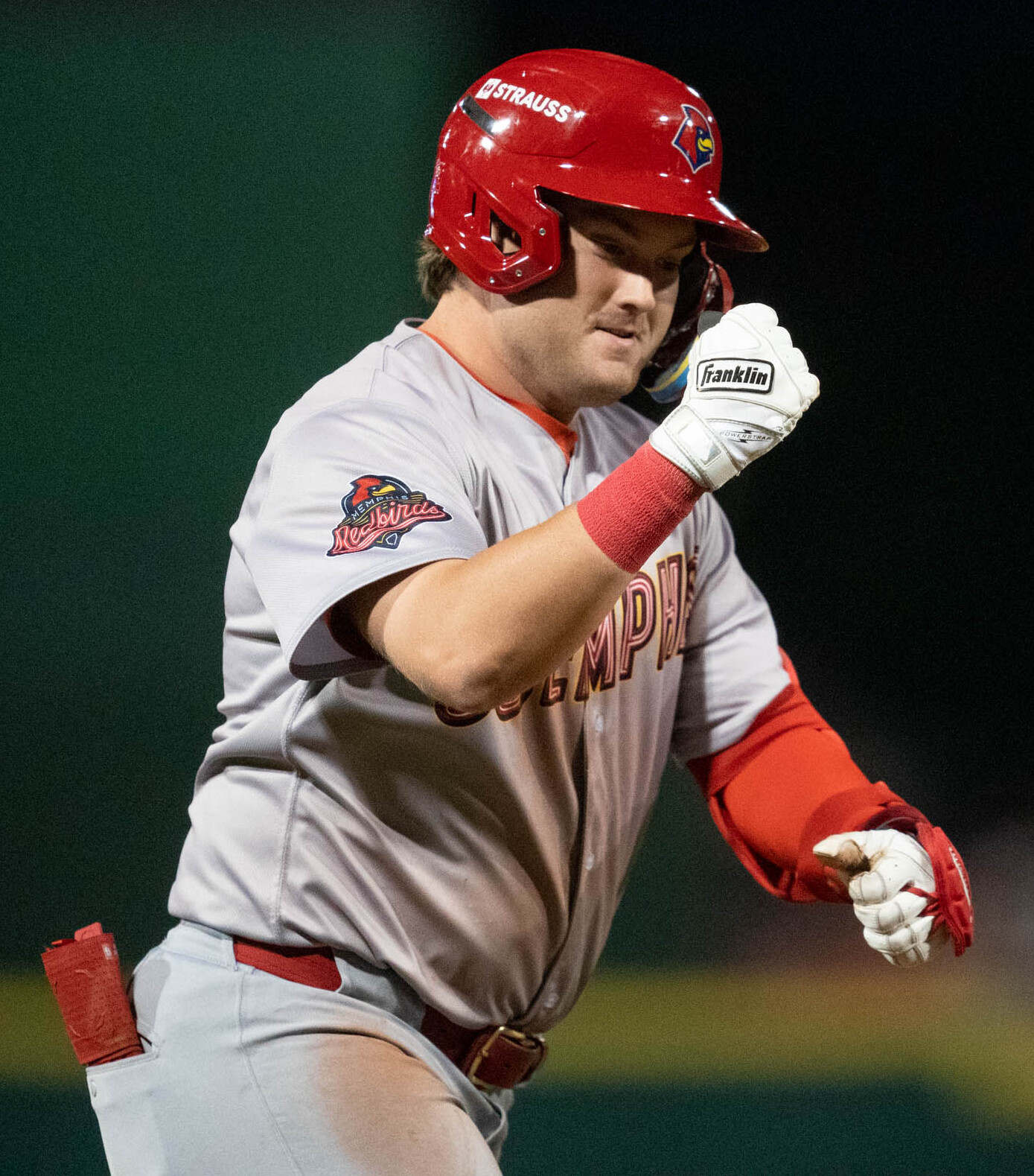
Jordan with the Memphis Redbirds in 2026

Jordan returned to Salem to open the 2022 season. In early August, he was promoted to the Greenville Drive of the High-A South Atlantic League. Over 120 games between both teams, he slashed .289/.363/.445 with 12 home runs, 68 RBI, and thirty doubles. During the 2023 season, Jordan batted .324 in 73 games with Greenville, and batted .254 with six home runs and 31 RBI in 49 games with the Portland Sea Dogs.

In early October 2023, Jordan wrote on Twitter about "dealing with anxiety and depression after seeing so many stories about it." Jordan returned to Portland to begin the 2024 season, ranked as the Red Sox' number 21 minor league prospect by Baseball America. Over 89 games for Portland, he hit .261 with seven home runs and 61 RBI. He missed time during the season due to a hand injury.

Jordan started the 2025 season with the Double-A Portland Sea Dogs before his promotion to the Triple-A Worcester Red Sox in June. He hit .320 with six home runs over 44 games with Portland and .298 with six home runs over another 44 games with Worcester.

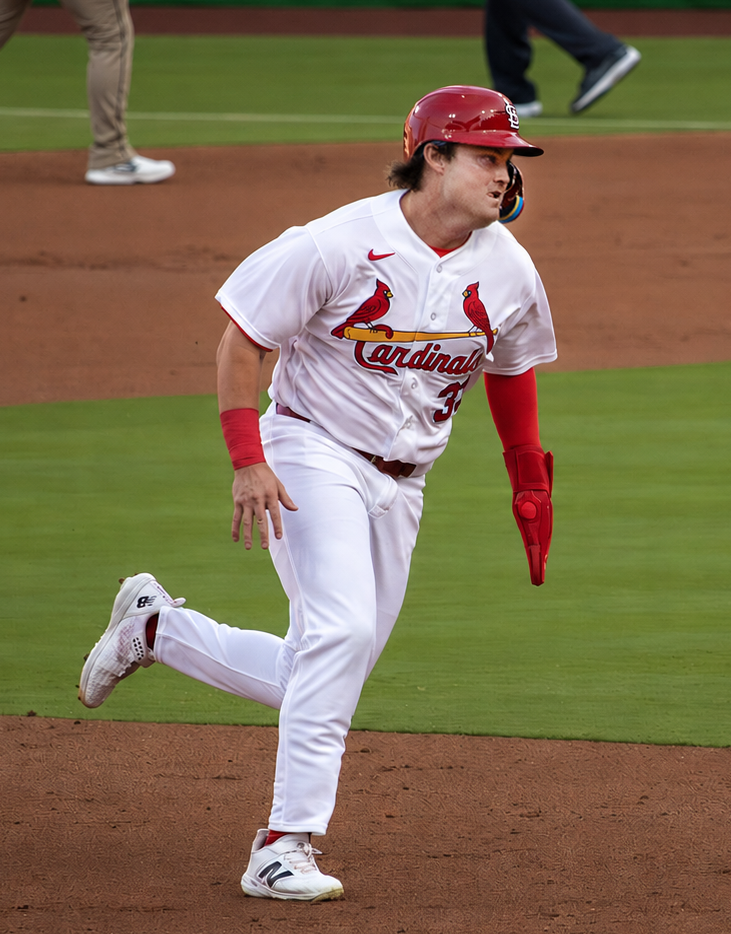
Jordan with St.Louis in 2026

=== St. Louis Cardinals ===
On July 31, 2025, Jordan was traded to the St. Louis Cardinals in exchange for pitcher Steven Matz. The Cardinals assigned him to the Triple-A Memphis Redbirds. Over 41 games with the Redbirds, Jordan batted .198 with seven home runs and 37 RBI. He was assigned back to Memphis to open the 2026 season. In 57 appearances for the Redbirds, Jordan slashed .313/.373/.548 with 11 home runs and 35 RBI.

On June 12, 2026, Jordan was selected to the 40-man roster and promoted to the major leagues for the first time. He made his MLB debut that night as the Cardinals' starting third baseman and recorded his first MLB hit, an RBI single off of Minnesota Twins pitcher Joe Ryan, in his first at-bat and finished the game 2-for-4. The next day, Jordan hit his first MLB home run, a three-run home run, off of Travis Adams, while also recording his first MLB triple in the game. On August 28, the Cardinals placed him on the injured list with a left ankle sprain, and he missed the remainder of the season. Jordan ended his rookie season with a .247 batting average, three home runs, and 28 RBI across 58 games.
