= Percy W. Allen =

Former Mississippi politician

Member of the Mississippi State Senate from the 29th district
- In office January 1932 – January 1940 Serving with J. A. Lake Jr.
- Preceded by: L. G. North; John L. Hebron Jr.
- Succeeded by: J. A. Lake Jr. Howard Jones

Personal details
- Born: July 30, 1889 Sardis, Mississippi, U.S.
- Died: December 31, 1943 (aged 54) Biloxi, Mississippi, U.S.
- Party: Democratic

Percy Wilmore Allen (July 30, 1889 - December 31, 1943) was an American lawyer and politician. He served in the Mississippi State Senate from 1932 to 1940.

== Biography ==
Percy Wilmore Allen was born on July 30, 1889, in Sardis, Mississippi. He served in the First World War. Allen was a lawyer who lived in Indianola, Mississippi. In March 1930, Mississippi Governor Theodore G. Bilbo appointed Allen to be the Prosecuting Attorney of Sunflower County, Mississippi. In 1931, Allen was elected to represent the 29th District (consisting of Humphreys, Sunflower, and Washington Counties) as a Democrat in the Mississippi State Senate, and served from 1932 to 1936.

In 1935, Allen was re-elected to the Senate and served from 1936 to 1940. During this term, Allen was the chairman of the Penitentiaries & Prisons Committee and the vice chairman of the Humane & Benevolent Institutions Committee. He also served in the following committees: Conservation of Natural Resources; Fees & Salaries; Insurance; Judiciary; Levees; Public Land; and Temperance. During his time in the Senate, Allen was the co-author of the bill creating the Mississippi State Game and Fish Committee.

In November 1943, Allen was once again re-elected to represent the 29th District. Allen died on December 31, 1943, in the Veterans Hospital in Biloxi, Mississippi, five days before his term would have begun.

== Personal life ==
Allen was a Missonary Baptist. He was married.
