= Frank B. Stephens =

American Politician

Member of the Mississippi House of Representatives from the Clay County district
- In office January 1916 – January 1920

Personal details
- Born: May 2, 1889 Clay County, MS
- Died: March 16, 1962 (aged 72) Jackson, MS
- Party: Democrat

Frank Bealle Stephens (May 2, 1889 - March 16, 1962) was a Democratic member of the Mississippi House of Representatives, representing Clay County, from 1916 to 1920.

== Biography ==
Frank Bealle Stephens was born on May 2, 1889, in Griffith, Clay County, Mississippi. He was the son of James L. Stephens and Addie (Burnitt) Stephens. His maternal grandmother's uncle (Frank's great-granduncle) was Thomas Clingman. He ran for the Mississippi House of Representatives to represent Clay County in 1911, but lost. However, he was elected in November 1915, along with Barney Semmelman. He was married to Lauraetta Hudson. He died in Jackson, Mississippi, on March 16, 1962.
