= DeSoto County School District =

School district in Mississippi, United States

Address
- 5 East South Street Hernando, Mississippi, 38632; United States

District information
- Type: Public
- Grades: PK–13
- Schools: 43
- NCES District ID: 2801320

Students and staff
- Students: 34,934 (2025–2026)
- Teachers: 2,282.20 (on an FTE basis) (2025–2026)
- Staff: 2,222.00 (on an FTE basis) (2025–2026)
- Student–teacher ratio: 15.31 (2025–2026)

Other information
- Website: www.desotocountyschools.org

DeSoto County Schools is a public school district based in Hernando, Mississippi (USA) and serving all public school students in DeSoto County in the Memphis metropolitan area. With an enrollment of more than 30,000 students, DeSoto County is the largest school district in the state of Mississippi.

== Schools ==
=== High schools ===
- Grades 9-12
  - Center Hill High School (Olive Branch)
  - DeSoto Central High School (Southaven)
  - Hernando High School (Hernando)
  - Horn Lake High School (Horn Lake)
  - Lake Cormorant High School (Lake Cormorant)
  - Lewisburg High School (Lewisburg)
  - Olive Branch High School (Olive Branch)
  - Southaven High School (Southaven)

=== Middle schools ===
- Center Hill Middle (Center Hill)
- DeSoto Central Middle School (DeSoto)
- Hernando Middle School (Hernando)
- Horn Lake Middle School (Horn Lake)
- Lake Cormorant Middle School (Lake Cormorant)
- Lewisburg Middle School (Lewisburg)
- Olive Branch Middle School (Olive Branch)
- Southaven Middle School (Southaven)

=== Intermediate schools ===
- Horn Lake Intermediate School (Horn Lake; Grades 3–5)
- Lewisburg Intermediate School (Lewisburg; Grades 4–5)
- Olive Branch Intermediate School (Olive Branch; Grades 4–5)
- Southaven Intermediate School (Southaven; Grades 3–5)
- Hernando Intermediate School (Hernando; Grades 4-5)

=== Elementary schools ===
- Center Hill Elementary School (Olive Branch; Grades K-5)
- Chickasaw Elementary School (Olive Branch; Grades 2–3)
- DeSoto Central Elementary School (Southaven; Grades 3–5)
- DeSoto Central Primary School (Southaven;Grades K-2)
- Greenbrook Elementary School (Southaven; Grades K-2)
- Hernando Elementary School (Hernando; Grades K-1)
- Hernando Hills Elementary School (Hernando; Grades 2–3)
- Horn Lake Elementary School (Horn Lake; Grades K-2)
- Lewisburg Primary School (Lewisburg; Grades PK-1)
- Lewisburg Elementary School (Lewisburg; Grades 2-5)
- Oak Grove Central Elementary School (Hernando; Grades K–1)
- Olive Branch Elementary School (Olive Branch; Grades K-1)
- Overpark Elementary School (Olive Branch; Grades K-5)
- Pleasant Hill Elementary School (Olive Branch; Grades K-5)
- Shadow Oaks Elementary School (Horn Lake; Grades K-2)
- Southaven Elementary School (Southaven; Grades K-5)
- Sullivan Elementary School (Southaven; Grades K-5)
- Walls Elementary School (Walls; Grades K-4)
- Lake Cormorant Elementary School (Lake Cormorant; Grades K-5)

=== Other campuses ===
- DeSoto County Alternative Center (Horn Lake)
- DeSoto County Career and Technology Center West (Horn Lake)
- DeSoto County Career and Technology Center East (Olive Branch)
- Magnolia School (Horn Lake and Southaven)

== Demographics ==
=== 2006-07 school year ===
There were a total of 28,738 students enrolled in the DeSoto County School District during the 2006–2007 school year. The gender makeup of the district was 48% female and 52% male. The racial makeup of the district was 26.05% African American, 67.91% White, 4.64% Hispanic, 1.22% Asian, and 0.18% Native American. 27.4% of the district's students were eligible to receive free lunch.

=== Previous school years ===
| School Year | Enrollment | Gender Makeup | | Racial Makeup | | | | |
| School Year | Enrollment | Female | Male | Asian | African American | Hispanic | Native American | White |
|---|---|---|---|---|---|---|---|---|
| 2005-06 | 27,166 | 48% | 52% | 1.21% | 24.14% | 4.12% | 0.20% | 70.33% |
| 2004-05 | 25,298 | 48% | 52% | 1.12% | 21.92% | 3.66% | 0.17% | 73.13% |
| 2003-04 | 23,672 | 48% | 52% | 1.03% | 20.54% | 3.18% | 0.17% | 75.08% |
| 2002-03 | 22,145 | 48% | 52% | 0.92% | 18.83% | 2.99% | 0.15% | 77.11% |

== Integration ==
The school district did not integrate until forced to by court order in 1970. As recently as 1997, one school had two principals; a white principal to deal with white students and another black principal to deal with black students. Of the district's 42 schools, only two have black principals.

=== Suspension controversy ===
While blacks make up approximately one third of the student population, they receive well over half of the suspensions from school. In 2015, the NAACP filed a complaint with the U.S. Department of Education's Office of Civil Rights, alleging that the school district has violated the Civil Rights Act by discriminating "against Black students on the basis of race through its discipline policies and practices fostering a school-to-prison pipeline and fueling racial disparities." The suit asks the federal government to force the district to revise the vague code of conduct which allows for uneven punishments of minority students. The school district has a long history of violating federal mandates requiring civil rights reforms. In addition to the racial disparities in suspension rates, they suit also alleges that punishments differ widely for the same actions. In one fight, for instance, a black student was suspended a week for shouting, while the white girl with whom she fought was suspended for only two days.

== Accountability statistics ==
| | 2006-07 | 2005-06 | 2004-05 | 2003-04 | 2002-03 |
|---|---|---|---|---|---|
| District Accreditation Status | Accredited | Accredited | Accredited | Accredited | Accredited |
School Performance Classifications
| Level 5 (Superior Performing) Schools | 16 | 11 | 15 | 15 | 15 |
| Level 4 (Exemplary) Schools | 11 | 12 | 6 | 5 | 5 |
| Level 3 (Successful) Schools | 0 | 1 | 2 | 2 | 1 |
| Level 2 (Under Performing) Schools | 0 | 0 | 0 | 0 | 0 |
| Level 1 (Low Performing) Schools | 0 | 0 | 0 | 0 | 0 |
| Not Assigned | 4 | 2 | 2 | 2 | 2 |

== See also ==
- List of school districts in Mississippi
