= Thomas J. Wingo =

Thomas Jefferson Wingo was a 20th-century physician and state legislator in Mississippi He lived in Toccopola.

== See also ==
- 1916–1920 Mississippi Legislature
