= Harry K. Murray =

American lawyer and politician

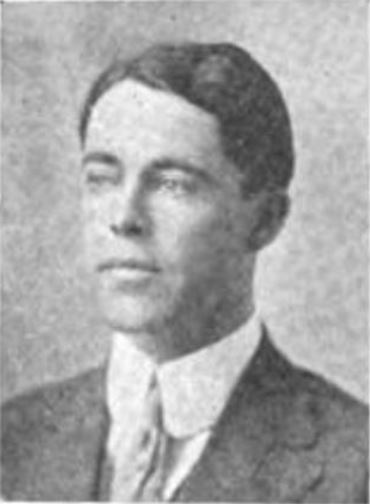
- c. 1917

Member of the Mississippi Senate from the 12th district
- In office January 1916 – January 1924

Personal details
- Born: March 6, 1886 Vicksburg, Mississippi
- Died: May 25, 1950 (aged 64)
- Party: Democrat

Harry Keyes Murray (March 6, 1886 - May 25, 1950) was an American lawyer and Democratic politician. He was a member of the Mississippi State Senate, representing Mississippi's 12th senatorial district, from 1916 to 1924. He was a resident of Vicksburg, Mississippi, at that time.

== Biography ==
Harry Keyes Murray was born on March 6, 1886, in Vicksburg, Mississippi, and was raised in Vicksburg, Mississippi. He graduated from St. Aloysius High School and Columbia University. He then started practicing law in Vicksburg. In 1915, he was elected to represent Mississippi's 12th senatorial district in the Mississippi State Senate for the 1916–1920 term. During that time period, he also served in World War I. After the war, he continued practicing law in Vicksburg. He was also re-elected to the Senate in 1919 for the 1920–1924 term. He died of an apparent heart attack during a medical examination on May 25, 1950, at age 64.
