= Roderick McGill =

American politician

Member of the Mississippi House of Representatives from the Benton County district
- In office January 1916 - January 1920
- Preceded by: W. E. Houston
- Succeeded by: W. E. Houston

Personal details
- Born: July 15, 1888 Falkner, Mississippi
- Died: July 1968 (aged 79–80)
- Party: Democrat

Roderick Benton McGill (July 15, 1888 – July 1968) was a Democratic member of the Mississippi House of Representatives, representing Benton County, from 1916 to 1920.

== Biography ==
Roderick Benton McGill was born on July 15, 1888, in Falkner, Tippah County, Mississippi. His parents were Henry Augustus McGill and Jessie Martha (Elliott) McGill. He was elected to the Mississippi House of Representatives, representing Benton County as a Democrat, in 1915. He was succeeded by his predecessor, W. E. Houston. He died in July 1968, while residing in Ripley, Mississippi.
