= Edgar M. Lane =

American politician

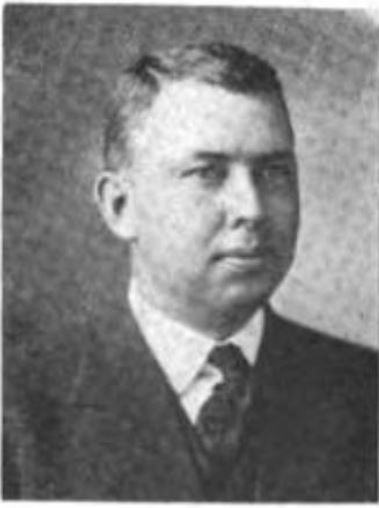
- c. 1917

Member of the Mississippi Senate from the 5th district
- In office January 1916 – January 1920

Member of the Mississippi House of Representatives from the Smith County district
- In office January 1920 – January 1924

Personal details
- Born: September 2, 1884 Smith County, MS
- Died: November 10, 1943 (aged 59) Jackson, Mississippi
- Party: Democrat

Edgar Moore Lane (September 2, 1884 - November 10, 1943) was an American lawyer, jurist, and Democratic politician. He was a member of the Mississippi legislature from Smith County and a Mississippi circuit court judge.

== Biography ==
Edgar Moore Lane was born on September 2, 1884, in Lorena, Smith County, Mississippi. He was the son of George Oscar Lane and Viola Susan (Anderson) Lane. Lane attended the public schools of Smith County. He graduated from Mississippi College with a B. A. with "distinction" in 1908. From 1907 to 1911, he was the Secretary of the Democratic Executive Committee of Smith County. He studied law at the University of Virginia and began practicing law in 1910. In 1915, he was elected to represent Mississippi's 5th senatorial district as a Democrat in the Mississippi State Senate for the 1916–1920 term. He was inaugurated in January 1916. In November 1919, he was elected to represent Smith County in the Mississippi House of Representatives. He served from 1920 to 1924. In 1930, Lane was elected circuit judge of Mississippi's 13th circuit court district. He was re-elected in 1934, 1938, and 1942. He was forced to retire due to poor health less than a year after his final term began. He died on November 10, 1943, in a hospital in Jackson, Mississippi.

== Personal life ==
Lane was a Methodist. He married Hasseltine Rainer in 1911. They had at least two children, including Rabian Dahl and Chalmers Keith.
