= Alpheus Batson =

American politician

Member of the Mississippi House of Representatives from the Greene County district Stone County (1917–1920)
- In office January 5, 1932 – January 1936
- In office September 1917 – January 1920

Personal details
- Born: November 21, 1869 Perry County, Mississippi, U.S.
- Party: Democratic

Alpheus Batson (November 21, 1869 – ?), also known as Alfred Batson, was an American lawyer and politician.

He was born on November 21, 1869, in Perry County, Mississippi. He was a lawyer and a merchant. A resident of Recluse, Mississippi, he represented Stone County in the Mississippi House of Representatives from 1917 to 1920. In 1916, he defeated J. M. Culpeper in an election to represent the newly formed Stone County in the Mississippi House of Representatives, with a vote of 384 to 323. He ran for re-election in 1919, but lost the Democratic primary to John M. "Mack" Alexander. Batson moved to Bothwell, Mississippi. He was later re-elected to the House, representing Greene County, for the 1932–1936 term.

== Personal life ==
Batson was a Methodist, and was married as of 1932.
