= David E. Crawley =

American lawyer

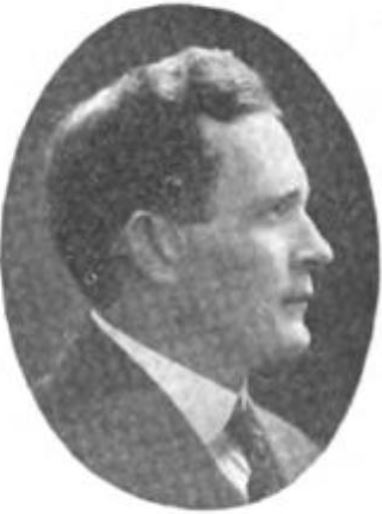
- c. 1917

Member of the Mississippi Senate from the 22nd district
- In office January 1940 – January 1944
- In office January 1916 – January 1920

Personal details
- Born: February 11, 1886 Center, Mississippi
- Died: November 29, 1946 (aged 60) Kosciusko, Mississippi
- Party: Democratic

David Ephraim Crawley (February 11, 1886 - November 29, 1946) was an American lawyer and politician. He was a Democratic member of the Mississippi State Senate from 1916 to 1920 and from 1940 to 1944.

== Biography ==
David Ephraim Crawley was born on February 11, 1886, in Center, Attala County, Mississippi. He was the son of Dr. James Tanner Crawley and Lucy Catherine (Dicken) Crawley. Crawley attended the common schools of Center and then attended Kosciusko High School. He entered the University of Mississippi in 1904 and graduated with a law degree in 1911. Then, he began practicing law in Kosciusko and Carthage, Mississippi. Crawley represented the 22nd district, which consisted of Attala County, in the Mississippi State Senate from 1916 to 1920. He was a Captain in the U. S. Field Artillery during World War I. From 1936 to 1937, he was the state commander of the American Legion and the President of the Mississippi Bar Association. He served in the Senate again from 1940 to 1944. He died in Kosciusko on November 29, 1946.
