= Bee King =

American politician

Member of the Mississippi Senate from the 4th district
- In office January 1918 – January 1924

Member of the Mississippi House of Representatives from the Rankin County district
- In office January 1900 – January 1904

Personal details
- Born: January 24, 1866 Trenton, Mississippi
- Died: January 18, 1949 (aged 82) Mendenhall, Mississippi
- Party: Democrat

Bee King (January 24, 1866 – January 18, 1949) was a Democratic member of the Mississippi State Legislature who served in the late 19th and early 20th centuries.

== Early life ==
Bee King was born on January 24, 1866, in Trenton, Mississippi. When he was young, he moved with his parents to Rankin County, Mississippi. He became a farmer. In 1897, he attended the Millsaps College law department and graduated in 1898. He was admitted to the bar the same year and began practicing in Mendenhall, Mississippi.

== Political career ==
In 1899, he was elected to represent Rankin County as a Democrat in the Mississippi House of Representatives. He served in that position from 1900 to 1904. After his term ended, he moved to Simpson County, Mississippi, where he continued practicing law. In a special election in February 1917, he was elected to represent Mississippi's redistricted 4th senatorial district in the Mississippi Senate. (H. C. Yawn, the 4th district senator, was moved to the 40th district). He served in the 1918 session. He was then re-elected to the position in 1919 and served from 1920 to 1924. He served as the mayor of Mendenhall, Mississippi, for several terms.

== Later life ==
He was the author of the "This and That" column of the Simpson County News. He died on January 18, 1949, in the Brandon Clinic in Mendenhall, Mississippi, and was buried in the cemetery there.
