= Toccopola, Mississippi =

- Town
- Location of Toccopola, Mississippi
- Coordinates: 34°15′21″N 89°13′16″W
- Country: United States
- State: Mississippi
- County: Pontotoc

Area
  - Total: 8.65 sq mi (22.40 km^{2})
  - Land: 8.45 sq mi (21.89 km^{2})
  - Water: 0.20 sq mi (0.51 km^{2})
- Elevation: 446 ft (136 m)

Population (2020)
  - Total: 286
  - Density: 33.9/sq mi (13.07/km^{2})
- Time zone: UTC-6 (Central (CST))
  - Summer (DST): UTC-5 (CDT)
- Postal code: 38874
- Area code: 662
- FIPS code: 28-73760
- GNIS feature ID: 2406740

Toccopola is a town in Pontotoc County, Mississippi, United States. As of the 2020 census, Toccopola had a population of 286.

The town took its name from an old Indian village which once stood in the area; its name in turn is derived from the Chickasaw language purported to mean "dismal prairie".

== History ==
Toccopola was originally settled by the Chickasaw. In 1840, Tobias and Allison Furr moved to the vicinity of Toccopola from Mecklenburg County, North Carolina and built a water mill and store. After the Civil War, W. B. Gilmer founded Toccopola College. The college closed in 1907 after the Gulf, Mobile and Northern Railroad bypassed Toccopola in favor of Pontotoc, which caused many citizens to leave the community.

In 1900, Toccopola had a population of 249, three churches, a high school, grist mill, and carriage shop.

== Geography ==
According to the United States Census Bureau, the town has a total area of 1.5 square miles (3.9 km^{2}), all land. Mississippi Highway 334 passes directly through Toccopola, connecting it with Oxford to the west, and Pontotoc to the east.

== Demographics ==
Historical population
Census	Pop.	Note	%±
1890	190		—
1900	249		31.1%
1910	233		−6.4%
1920	325		39.5%
1930	288		−11.4%
1940	332		15.3%
1950	262		−21.1%
1960	198		−24.4%
1970	175		−11.6%
1980	184		5.1%
1990	154		−16.3%
2000	189		22.7%
2010	246		30.2%
2020	286		16.3%
U.S. Decennial Census

As of the census of 2000, there were 189 people, 71 households, and 56 families residing in the town. The population density was 127.3 inhabitants per square mile (49.2/km^{2}). There were 84 housing units at an average density of 56.6 per square mile (21.9/km^{2}). The racial makeup of the town was 98.41% White, 0.53% African American, and 1.06% from two or more races.

There were 71 households, out of which 35.2% had children under the age of 18 living with them, 53.5% were married couples living together, 19.7% had a female householder with no husband present, and 21.1% were non-families. 19.7% of all households were made up of individuals, and 11.3% had someone living alone who was 65 years of age or older. The average household size was 2.66 and the average family size was 3.04.

In the town, the population was spread out, with 25.4% under the age of 18, 7.4% from 18 to 24, 29.1% from 25 to 44, 23.8% from 45 to 64, and 14.3% who were 65 years of age or older. The median age was 38 years. For every 100 females there were 96.9 males. For every 100 females age 18 and over, there were 104.3 males.

The median income for a household in the town was $20,625, and the median income for a family was $24,375. Males had a median income of $21,667 versus $24,688 for females. The per capita income for the town was $9,566. About 28.3% of families and 26.0% of the population were below the poverty line, including 36.7% of those under the age of eighteen and 28.6% of those 65 or over.

== Education ==
The town of Toccopola is served by the Pontotoc County School District.

The University of Mississippi is located under 25 miles from Toccopola.

== Notable people ==
- Betsy Love Allen - Advanced the 1839 Married Women's Property Act in Mississippi.
- Harmonica Frank - Blues singer, guitarist, and harmonicist born in Toccopola.
- Thomas J. Wingo, former member of the Mississippi House of Representatives
