= Howard Lee Miller =

American politician (1888–1977)

Member of the Mississippi House of Representatives from the Clarke and Jasper counties district
- In office January 1920 – January 1924

Member of the Mississippi House of Representatives from the Clarke County district
- In office January 1916 – January 1920

Personal details
- Born: July 6, 1888 Increase, MS
- Died: October 17, 1977 (aged 89) Quitman, MS
- Party: Democrat

Howard Lee Miller (July 6, 1888 - October 7, 1977) was a Democratic member of the Mississippi House of Representatives from Clarke County, serving from 1916 to 1924.

== Biography ==
Howard Lee Miller was born on July 6, 1888, in Increase, Mississippi. He was the son of Eli Carmichael Miller and Martha Ann (Dearman) Miller. He graduated from Millsaps College with a L.L.B. in 1915. He died on October 17, 1977, in the Watkins Hospital in Quitman, Mississippi, after a long illness.

== Political career ==
He was elected to the Mississippi House of Representatives in November 1915, representing Clarke County, as a Democrat. From 1920 to 1924, he was re-elected a floater representative, representing Clarke and Jasper counties. Later, he became the Sheriff of Clarke County.

== Personal life ==
He married Ulrica Strobel, and they had at least two children.
