= William R. Chrismond =

American politician (1868-1926)

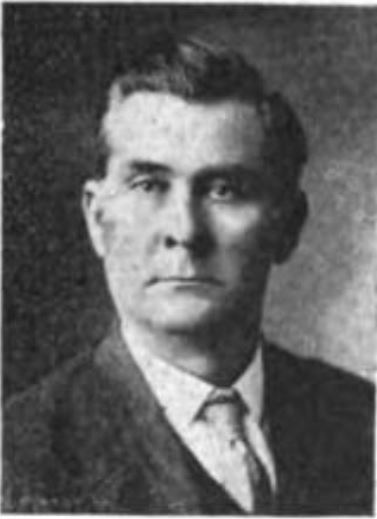
- c. 1917

Member of the Mississippi State Senate from the 23rd district
- In office January 1916 – January 1920

Personal details
- Born: April 30, 1868 Greensboro, Mississippi
- Died: August 19, 1926 (aged 58) Jackson, Mississippi
- Party: Democratic

William Riley Chrismond (April 30, 1868 – August 19, 1926) was an American Democratic politician. He was a member of the Mississippi State Senate from 1916 to 1920.

== Biography ==
William Riley Chrismond was born on April 30, 1868, in Greensboro, Webster County, Mississippi. He was the son of David Edwin Chrismond and his wife, Elvenie (Tyson) Chrismond. In his youth, Chrismond worked on his family farm and attended the public schools of Webster County until 1888. In 1889, he entered Bellefontaine High School, and studied to be a teacher. He was a teacher until 1899.

From 1900 to 1904, Chrismond was the Justice of the Peace for his district. He was the Sheriff of Choctaw County from 1912 to 1916. He represented the 23rd District (composed of Oktibbeha and Choctaw Counties) as a Democrat in the Mississippi State Senate from 1916 to 1920. After his Senate term, he was re-elected to the position of Choctaw County Sheriff. Chrismond died on August 19, 1926, in a hospital in Jackson, Mississippi.

== Personal life ==
Chrismond was a Baptist. He married Willie Florence Stephenson on December 10, 1893. They had six children together.
