= Eugene Verell =

American politician

Member of the Mississippi House of Representatives from the Chickasaw County district
- In office 1916-1920

Personal details
- Born: November 26, 1859 Webster County, Mississippi
- Died: April 30, 1921 (aged 61) Itawamba County, Mississippi
- Party: Democrat

Eugene Miltern (or Milton) Verell (November 26, 1859 – April 30, 1921) was a Democratic member of the Mississippi House of Representatives, representing Chickasaw County, from 1916 to 1920.

== Biography ==
Eugene Miltern Verrell was born on November 26, 1859, in Webster County, Mississippi. His parents were Charles Edward Verell and Leah Malindy (Terry) Verrell. He married Susan Middleton in 1885. He was elected to the Mississippi House of Representatives, representing Chickasaw County as a Democrat, in November 1915. He died on April 30, 1921, in Chick, Mississippi, and was buried in Houston, Mississippi.
