= Fenelon D. Hewitt =

Mississippi politician

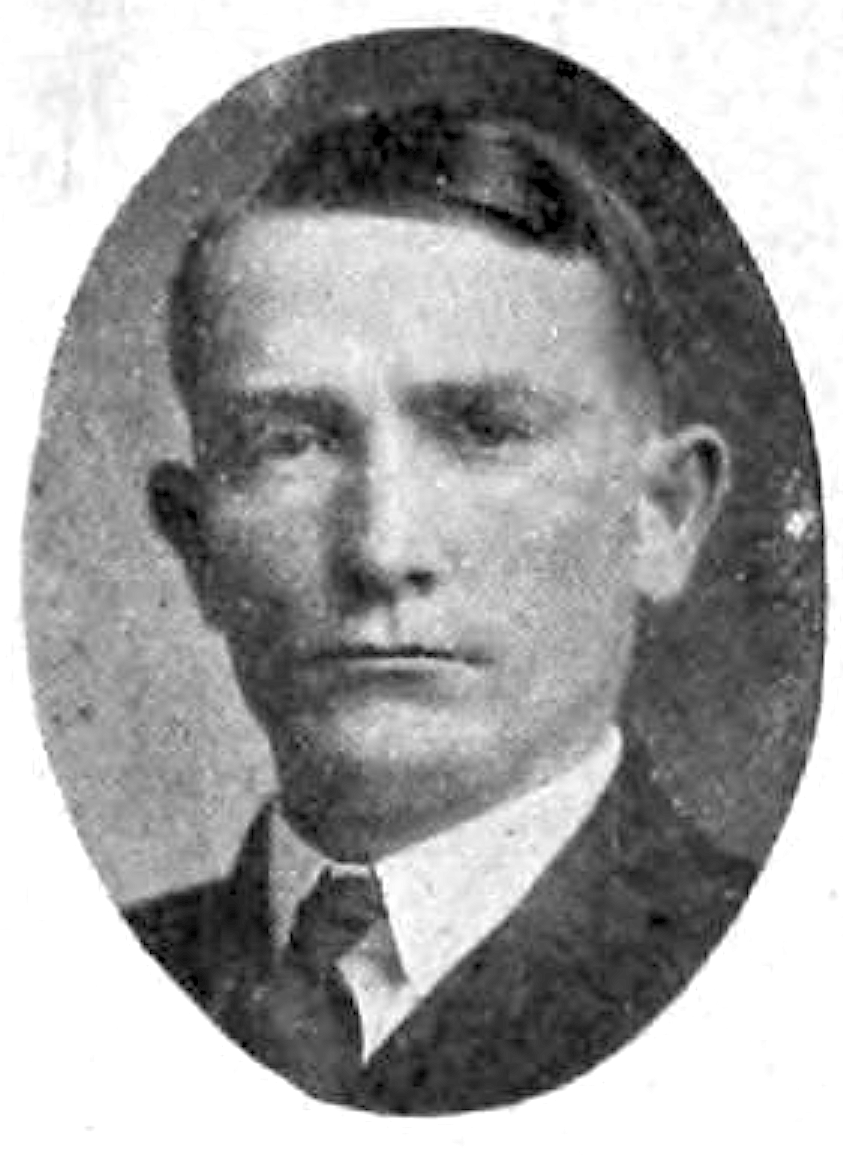

Member of the Mississippi House of Representatives from the Pike County district
- In office January 1944 – January 1948
- In office January 1916 – January 1920

Personal details
- Born: February 26, 1883 Amite County, Mississippi, U.S.
- Died: October 26, 1961 (aged 78) McComb, Mississippi
- Party: Democrat

Fenelon Dobyns Hewitt (February 26, 1883 – October 29, 1961) was an American politician and lawyer. Hewitt was a Democratic member of the Mississippi House of Representatives, representing Pike County, from 1916 to 1920 and from 1944 to 1948.

== Biography ==
Hewitt was born in 1883 in Mars Hill, near Smithdale, in Amite County, Mississippi. He was one of 11 sons and a daughter born to Thomas J. and Emily Loflin Hewitt. Three of his siblings died in infancy, but five of his brothers became doctors. He attended Mars Hill Public School. He attended Millsaps College, graduating with honors in 1905. He graduated from the University of Mississippi with a L. L. B. in 1907.

He began practicing law in the same year in McComb, Mississippi. He was a Judge of the Police Court there from 1909 to 1913. After being elected in November 1915, he represented Pike County as a Democrat in the Mississippi House of Representatives from 1916 to 1920. Later, he served another term in the same position from 1944 to 1948.

He died in McComb Infirmary in 1961, three days after suffering a stroke while presiding in a Magnolia court.
