= Toomsuba, Mississippi =

- Census-designated place
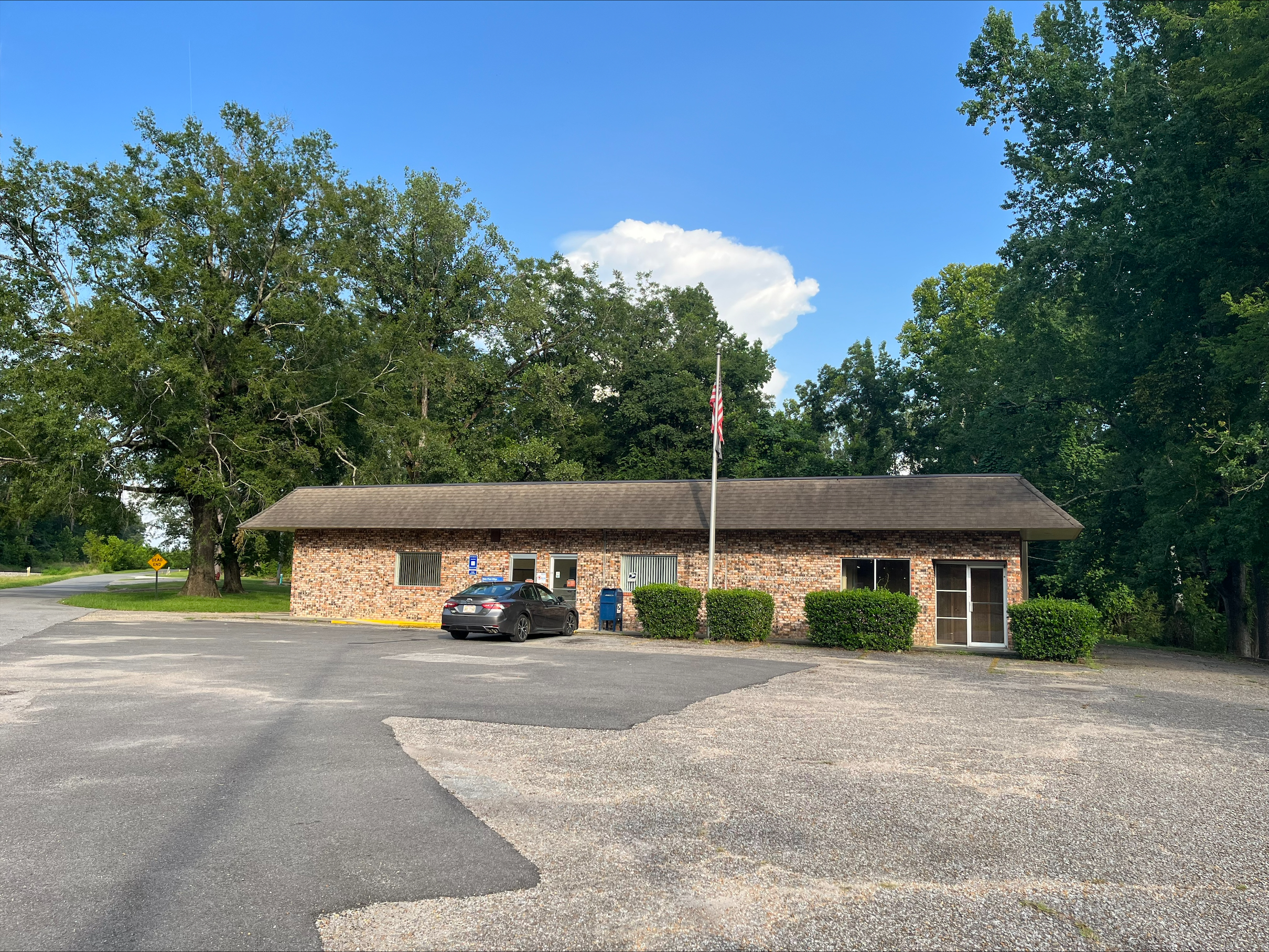
- Toomsuba Post Office

- Location within Mississippi Location within the United States
- Coordinates: 32°25′07″N 88°30′25″W
- Country: United States
- State: Mississippi
- County: Lauderdale

Area
  - Total: 5.00 sq mi (12.96 km^{2})
  - Land: 4.69 sq mi (12.14 km^{2})
  - Water: 0.31 sq mi (0.81 km^{2})
- Elevation: 302 ft (92 m)

Population (2020)
  - Total: 778
  - Density: 165.9/sq mi (64.06/km^{2})
- Time zone: UTC-6 (Central (CST))
  - Summer (DST): UTC-5 (CDT)
- ZIP code: 39364
- Area codes: 601 & 769
- GNIS feature ID: 678818
- FIPS code: 28-73880

Toomsuba is a census-designated place (CDP) and unincorporated community in Lauderdale County, Mississippi, United States. Its population was 778 as of the 2020 census.

The community is named after Toomsuba Creek.

== Geography ==
Toomsuba is in eastern Lauderdale County, 13 miles (21 km) east of Meridian, the county seat. U.S. Routes 80 and 11 pass through the community as its main street. Interstate Highways 20 and 59 run along the southern edge of the community, with access from Exit 165 (Will Garrett Road). I-20 and I-59 lead west to Meridian and northeast 77 miles (124 km) to Tuscaloosa, Alabama, while U.S. Route 11 and 80 lead west to Meridian and east 9 miles (14 km) to their split near Cuba, Alabama.

According to the U.S. Census Bureau, the Toomsuba CDP has a total area of 5.0 square miles (13.0 km^{2}), of which 4.7 square miles (12.1 km^{2}) are land and 0.3 square miles (0.8 km^{2}), or 6.27%, are land. In addition to the Toomsuba town center at the crossroads of US 11/80 with Will Garrett Road and Lauderdale–Toomsuba Road, the CDP contains residential development around Bailey Lake, a reservoir just west of the town center.

== Demographics ==
Historical population
Census	Pop.	Note	%±
2020	778		—
U.S. Decennial Census

Toomsuba first appeared as a census designated place in the 2010 U.S. census.

Toomsuba racial composition as of 2020 (NH = Non-Hispanic) (Note: Note: the US Census treats Hispanic/Latino as an ethnic category. This table excludes Latinos from the racial categories and assigns them to a separate category. Hispanics/Latinos can be of any race.)
Race	Number	Percentage
White (NH)	432	55.53%
Black or African American (NH)	305	39.2%
Some Other Race (NH)	2	0.26%
Mixed/Multi-Racial (NH)	20	2.57%
Hispanic or Latino	19	2.44%
Total	778	

As of the 2020 United States census, there were 778 people, 300 households, and 194 families residing in the CDP.

== Notable people ==
- Norman Robinson, former New Orleans journalist
- Jack Spinks, former National Football League fullback and partial namesake of Casem-Spinks Stadium, the home stadium of the Alcorn State Braves
- Richard E. Thompson, member of the Mississippi State Senate from 1916 to 1920
- John A. Yeager, member of the Mississippi House of Representatives from 1916 to 1932
