= George Washington Russell =

American politician

Member of the Mississippi House of Representatives from the Copiah County district
- In office January 1916 – January 1924 Serving with Benjamin King Jr. John A. Smylie

Personal details
- Born: November 14, 1879 Lawrence County, MS
- Died: November 1961 (aged 82)
- Party: Democrat

George Washington Russell (November 14, 1879 - November 1961) was a Democratic member of the Mississippi House of Representatives, representing Copiah County, from 1916 to 1924.

== Biography ==
George Washington Russell was born on November 14, 1879, near Monticello, in Lawrence County, Mississippi. He was the son of Fletcher Russell and Sarah Elizabeth (Bass) Russell. He attended the public schools of Copiah County and graduated from Hazlehurst High School. In 1908, he was the editor and manager of the short-lived Union Advocate newspaper. In 1915, he was elected to represent Copiah County as a Democrat in the Mississippi House of Representatives from 1916 to 1920. He was re-elected to serve from 1920 to 1924. He died in November 1961 at age 82 after a long illness.
