= Luther W. Maples =

American politician

Member of the Mississippi House of Representatives from the George County district
- In office January 1916 – January 1920

Personal details
- Born: November 14, 1891 George County, MS
- Died: January 4, 1971 (aged 79) Gulfport, MS
- Party: Democrat
- Children: 3

Luther Whit Maples (November 14, 1891 – January 4, 1971) was a Democratic member of the Mississippi House of Representatives, representing George County, from 1916 to 1920.

== Biography ==
Luther Whit Maples was born on November 14, 1891, in Clarence, George County, Mississippi. His parents were John Maples and Josephine (Bond) Maples. Luther was a farmer. In November 1915, he was elected to represent George County in the Mississippi House of Representatives as a Democrat. He fought for the United States during World War I. He established the first family juvenile court in Mississippi. He died on January 4, 1971, after a lengthy illness, in Gulfport, Mississippi. He was survived by a widow and three children, two daughters and a son.
