= Kingbee, Missouri =

Town in Ripley County, Missouri

Coordinates: 36.7092228°N 90.6659515°W

Kingbee is an extinct town in Ripley County, Missouri. Kingbee is part of Missouri.

A post office called Kingbee was established in 1896, and remained in operation until 1909. The community was so named on account of its status as an economic center.
