= John A. Yeager =

American lawyer and politician (1882–1955)

Member of the Mississippi House of Representatives from the Lamar County district
- In office January 1916 – January 1932

Personal details
- Born: January 17, 1882 Toomsuba, Mississippi
- Died: June 16, 1955 (aged 73) Hattiesburg, Mississippi
- Party: Democrat
- Children: 7

John Alexander Yeager (January 17, 1882 – June 16, 1955) was an American lawyer and Democratic politician. He represented Lamar County in the Mississippi House of Representatives from 1916 to 1932.

== Biography ==
John Alexander Yeager was born on January 17, 1882, in Toomsuba, Mississippi. He was the son of Daniel Wayne Yeager and Lucinda Jane (Dodd) Yeager. He attended the public schools of Lauderdale County, Mississippi. In 1906, he registered with the American Correspondence School of Law and completed the course in 1909. He was then admitted to the bar. Before 1915, he was a mayor of Seminary, Mississippi. During his campaign for the Mississippi House of Representatives in 1915, he advocated for the preservation of Mississippi's old capitol building, a rural credits law, and a new constitutional convention, and he also opposed a change in the state's current jury system. In November 1915, he was elected to represent Lamar County as a Democrat in the Mississippi House of Representatives and served in the 1916–1920 term. He was re-elected multiple times, and served until 1932, when he was succeeded by E. L. Clinton. He died after a short illness on June 16, 1955, in the Methodist Hospital in Hattiesburg, Mississippi.

== Personal life ==
Yeager was a member of the Methodist Church and the Freemasons. He married Pearl Robeson on January 14, 1903. They had four children. After Pearl died on May 17, 1910, Yeager married Corean Anderson on June 11, 1911. They had three children together.
