= Benjamin King Jr. =

American politician

Member of the Mississippi House of Representatives from the Copiah County district
- In office January 1916 – January 1920 Serving with George Washington Russell; John A. Smylie

Personal details
- Born: December 30, 1890 Beauregard, Mississippi
- Died: April 1956 (aged 65) Jackson, Mississippi
- Party: Democrat

Benjamin King Jr. (December 30, 1890 - April 1956) was a Democratic member of the Mississippi House of Representatives, representing Copiah County, from 1916 to 1920.

== Biography ==
Benjamin King, Jr. was born on December 30, 1890, in Beauregard, Copiah County, Mississippi. He was the son of Mississippi state senator Benjamin King Sr. and Evaline (Harris) King. Benjamin Junior graduated from Wesson High School in 1909. He then attended Ruskin Cave College in Tennessee for two years. He then was a teacher in Copiah County schools for three years. After studying law privately, he passed the bar examination in 1912 and began practicing law in Hazlehurst. He was elected to represent Copiah County as a Democrat in the Mississippi House of Representatives in 1915 for the 1916–1920 term. He died after a brief illness in April 1956 in Jackson, Mississippi.
