= Causeyville Historic District =

Historic district in Mississippi, United States

- U.S. National Register of Historic Places
- U.S. Historic district
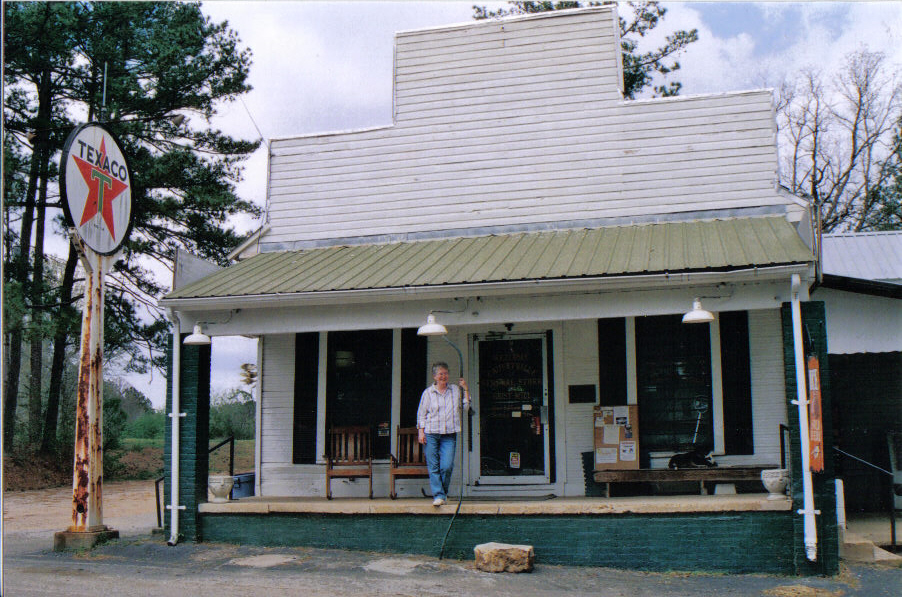
- Bostick's Store (known locally as the Causeyville Store), a contributing property

- Location within Mississippi Location within the United States
- Location: Meridian-Causeyville Rd, Causeyville, Mississippi
- Coordinates: 32°15′30″N 88°33′46″W
- Area: 2.5 acres (1.0 ha)
- Architectural style: Queen Anne, Vernacular Cottage
- NRHP reference No.: 86000058
- Added to NRHP: January 2, 1986

Causeyville, Mississippi (also known as Increase) is a small community in southeastern Lauderdale County, Mississippi, about twelve miles southeast of the city of Meridian. The Causeyville Historic District consists of four buildings at the center of the community — two general stores and two residences — that exemplify the pivotal contribution that small communities like Causeyville made to the development of Lauderdale County. The district was added to the National Register of Historic Places in 1986.

== History ==
Established in 1833, Lauderdale County has always been one of the most prosperous counties in Mississippi. Meridian, the county seat, is located at the intersection of several major railroads and thus served as a transportation hub for early Lauderdale County. Locals in the farming and timber industries sent their products to Meridian to be loaded onto the trains and shipped to other cities.

With the exception of Meridian, Lauderdale County is mostly rural, remaining largely as it was at the turn of the 20th century and even earlier. Before automobiles and personal transportation became widespread, many of the early settlers of Lauderdale County grouped into small population clusters that relied nearly entirely on local resources, each community isolated from the others. Some communities like Causeyville had a store, and some had post offices and other infrastructural institutions, but many did not have any of these buildings.

Causeyville, named after a local family that settled the area in the 1820s, thrived in the pre–Civil War era. The community was a commercial center in southeastern Lauderdale County, and its inhabitants also produced lumber and agricultural products. Though most of the buildings that fed the local economy have long been demolished, there are pictures of an antebellum store, a cotton gin, and a sawmill used for a local logging company. The four buildings in the Causeyville Historic District were built between 1860 and 1930 and demonstrate the community's growth during that period. All four buildings are located along Causeyville Road; the two general stores are on the northern side of the road, and the two residences face the stores on the southern side. The four buildings in the district are all that remain of this economy.

== Contributing properties ==
=== Raynor's store ===
The R.S. Raynor store is the oldest of the four buildings in the district, built around 1860, and it still retains most of its original board and batten siding. The building also retains the original design of the undercut porch, which runs along the southern and eastern sides of the buildings, although it was reconstructed in the latter half of the 20th century. It is rumored that the pine boards used to construct the inner walls of the store were cut at the sawmill that used to exist behind the store.

The building was originally a trading post between European settlers and Choctaw Indians but was repurposed to serve as a community post office in 1894. Because there was already a "Causeyville" post office in Mississippi, the post office before the one at Raynor's store had been named "Edbony" since 1887. When the post office moved to Raynor's store, the name was changed to "Increase". Many maps still use "Increase" for the community. When the Increase post office was discontinued in 1929, the community was officially called "Causeyville".

After T.J. Bostick's store was built in 1895, Raynor's store served as a warehouse for Bostick's lumber mill and turpentine manufacturing business. During the 1920s, the original wooden roof was replaced with a tin one, which is still in place today. The building was used as a cotton warehouse in the 1930s and as an auto repair garage in the 1940s. In 1943, the original wooden floor was removed and replaced with cement, and garage doors were installed on the eastern side of the building. The garage doors were later removed when the building was repurposed yet again as the Lauderdale County Equipment Maintenance Shop throughout the 1950s and '60s, as a warehouse again between 1976 and 1983, and finally as a commercial building again after 1983. Other alterations to the original design include the addition of an interior wall to shield customers from the dust produced by the grist mill in the rear of the building and the addition of two small rooms–one at the rear of the building and the other on the western side–that served as a grist mill equipment shed and a feed storage area. The additions were built with materials similar to those used in the original design. The International Harvester grist mill usually operates only on Saturdays.

=== T.J. Bostick's store ===
The T.J. Bostick Store has sold merchandise continuously since it was built in 1895. Over its lifespan it has more than tripled in size, being home a different points throughout its history to a post office, a barbershop, a doctor's office, a drug store, the town hall, a voting precinct, a Ford dealership, a residence, a feed and fertilizer storage area, a theater, and a storage area for merchandise. The post office was moved from Raynor's store when Bostick's was built in 1895, and it remained in Bostick's store until 1929. The building was split into two halves in the 1930s and later recombined in 1983.

The original facade is now covered by a false front parapet on which many commercial signs have hung throughout the building's lifetime. A room was added to the southeast corner of the house to hold the doctor's office, and a covered patio previously held the grist mill now in Raynor's store. The back of the store today holds a mechanical music museum, which is home to antique music boxes, player pianos, movie posters, and other antique instruments.

Though the store originally began as a general store, it has slowly morphed into something akin to a convenient store as culture has evolved to be more automobile-centered. When the Hagwood family bought the store in 1942, their son Leslie remembers people buying an entire month's supply, but by the 1980s, that no longer happened. Hagwood told the Kentucky New Era in 1988 that the store could no longer be defined as a true country store because his main competitors were convenient stores.

=== James E. Smith house ===
The James E. Smith house was built in 1895 in the Queen Anne Cottage style. Smith, the house's original owner was a partner of Bostick's in his store. Smith's son, Grady W. Smith, was the first president of the East Mississippi Electric Power Association (EMEPA) and helped bring electricity to Causeyville through the Rural Electrification Act. Will Bostick, one of T.J.'s sons, rented a room in the house for a few years while managing the lumbermill onsite.

=== J.W. Grantham house ===
When the Bosticks moved to Meridian in about 1905, J.W. Grantham bought the Bostick store as well as this house across the street from the Raynor's store. Grantham continued to operate the store until the 1930s.
