= Una, Mississippi =

- Unincorporated community
- Location within Mississippi Location within the United States
- Coordinates: 33°47′49″N 88°48′25″W
- Country: United States
- State: Mississippi
- County: Clay
- Elevation: 282 ft (86 m)
- Time zone: UTC-6 (Central (CST))
  - Summer (DST): UTC-5 (CDT)
- Area code: 662
- GNIS feature ID: 679024

Una is an unincorporated community in Clay County, Mississippi, United States.

The Una Post Office operated from 1890 to 1906. The Una School District once operated a school in Una.

The Lawson Chapel is located in Una. Fire protection is offered by the Clay County Volunteer Fire Department Unit 400.
