= Patrick Claiborne Meagher =

American politician

Member of the Mississippi House of Representatives from the Yazoo County district
- In office January 1916 – November 24, 1920

Personal details
- Born: February 18, 1869 Yazoo County, MS
- Died: November 24, 1920 (aged 51) Yazoo County, MS
- Party: Democrat

Patrick Claiborne Meagher (February 18, 1869 - November 24, 1920) was a Democratic member of the Mississippi House of Representatives, representing Yazoo County, from 1916 until his death.

== Biography ==
Patrick Claiborne Meagher was born on February 18, 1869, in Dover, Yazoo County, Mississippi. His parents were Irish immigrant and Confederate Civil War veteran Patrick Farrell Meagher, and Maggie (Riley) Meagher. He was the Treasurer of Yazoo County until 1916. He was first elected to the Mississippi House of Representatives to represent his native Yazoo County, as a Democrat, in November 1915. He was re-elected in 1919. However, he died on November 24, 1920, in Yazoo County, before his term ended. He never married.
