= Claude E. Hill =

American lawyer and politician

Member of the Mississippi State Senate from the 42nd district
- In office 1917 – January 1920
- Preceded by: Newly created district

Personal details
- Born: 1885 or 1886
- Died: May 12, 1947 (aged 61) Hattiesburg, Mississippi, U.S.
- Party: Democratic

Claude E. Hill (1885/1886 – May 12, 1947) was an American lawyer and Democratic politician. He was a member of the Mississippi State Senate, representing the 42nd district, from 1917 to 1920.

== Early life ==
Claude E. Hill was born in 1885 or 1886. He was the son of N. C. Hill, a judge. He moved to Hattiesburg, Mississippi, in 1898. He graduated from high school as the valedictorian of his class in May 1903. He attended the University of Mississippi from September 1903 to June 1907, and graduated with a Bachelor of Arts degree. He then was an assistant law clerk for two years before taking a two-year course at the University of Mississippi School of Law, finishing the course in only one year.

== Career ==
He began practicing law in July 1909. He was elected the attorney of the county Board of Supervisors in January 1910 and unanimously re-elected in January 1911. Then, Hill served two terms as Forrest County's county attorney, ending in 1915. In January 1917, Hill announced his candidacy to represent the newly created 42nd district in the Mississippi State Senate for the latter half of the 1916-1920 legislature. He was elected as he was the only candidate running. He served in the legislature's 1917 and 1918 sessions. In January 1944, Hill became Mississippi's assistant Attorney General.

He died in Hattiesburg while still holding that position on May 12, 1947.
