= Irvin Abernathy =

American politician

Member of the Mississippi House of Representatives from the Chickasaw County district
- In office January 3, 1916 – February 4, 1925

Personal details
- Born: August 23, 1852 Troy, Mississippi
- Died: February 4, 1925 (aged 72) Chickasaw County, Mississippi
- Party: Democrat
- Spouse: Mary Jane Laughlin (m. 1882)
- Children: 8

Irvin Valentine Abernathy (August 23, 1852 – February 4, 1925) was a Democratic member of the Mississippi House of Representatives, representing Chickasaw County, from 1916 until his death.

== Biography ==
Irvin Valentine Abernathy was born on August 23, 1852, in Troy, Mississippi. His parents were Marion Abernathy and Martha (Wilson) Abernathy. He married Mary Jane Laughlin in 1882. Before becoming a member of the Mississippi House of Representatives, he was a member of the Board of Supervisors of Chickasaw County, and was a public cotton weigher for 10 years. He was elected to the Mississippi House of Representatives, representing Chickasaw County as a Democrat, in November 1915, for the 1916–1920 term. He was re-elected in November 1919. He was re-elected once more in November 1923. However, he died before finishing his term, on February 4, 1925, in Chickasaw County, Mississippi. He was buried in the IOOF cemetery there.
