= Walton Shields =

American lawyer

Member of the Mississippi State Senate from the 29th district
- In office 1917 – January 19, 1927
- Preceded by: Van Buren Boddie

Personal details
- Born: October 15, 1870 Oxford, Mississippi
- Died: January 19, 1927 (aged 56) Greenville, Mississippi
- Party: Democratic

Walton Shields (October 15, 1870 - January 19, 1927) was an American politician and lawyer. He was a member of the Mississippi State Senate from 1917 to his death in 1927.

== Biography ==
Walton Shields was born on October 15, 1870, in Oxford, Mississippi. He was the son of John Whitfield Shields and Sallie (Walton) Shields. Shields attended the public and private schools of Greenville, Mississippi. He then attended the University of Mississippi and received his B. P. degree in 1889 and L. L. B. degree in 1890. He began practicing law in Greenville in 1891. In 1891, Shields also served as District Attorney. In 1898, after the Spanish-American War was declared, he enlisted as a private in Company C of the Second Mississippi Infantry. By the time he was mustered out in 1901, he was a Captain of the Fifth United States volunteer infantry (under Major James K. Vardaman). In 1902 and 1903, he was the mayor of Greenville, Mississippi. Shields began representing the 29th District as a Democrat in the Mississippi State Senate in the 1917 session, succeeding Van Buren Boddie in the middle of his term, and the term ended in 1920. In 1919, Shields was elected to a full term and served from 1920 to 1924. Shields was re-elected again for the 1924–1928 term. Shields died in the middle of this term, on January 19, 1927, in Greenville, Mississippi.
