= Francis M. Johnson =

American politician (1850–1924)

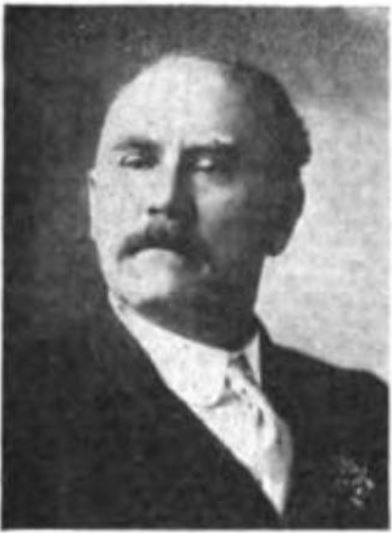
- c. 1917

Member of the Mississippi Senate from the 41st (1918-1920) district 1st (1916-1918)
- In office January 1916 – January 1920

Member of the Mississippi House of Representatives from the Jackson and Harrison counties district
- In office January 1912 - January 1916
- Succeeded by: J. M. Hairston
- In office January 1920 – January 1924
- Preceded by: J. M. Hairston

Personal details
- Born: October 22, 1850 Jackson County, Mississippi, U.S.
- Died: October 2, 1924 (aged 73) Biloxi, Mississippi, U.S.
- Party: Democrat
- Children: 2

Francis Marion Johnson (October 22, 1850 - October 2, 1924) was an American politician. He was a Democratic member of the Mississippi State Senate and of the Mississippi House of Representatives in the early 20th century.

== Biography ==
Francis Marion Johnson was born on October 22, 1850, in Americus, Jackson County, Mississippi. He was the son of Samuel Wyles Johnson, who died at the Battle of Missionary Ridge, and Marie Louise (Graham) Johnson. He was admitted to the bar in 1879, but never practiced law. He was elected to the Mississippi House of Representatives, representing the Jackson and Harrison Counties floater district, in November 1911. In November 1915, he was elected to represent Mississippi's first district in the Mississippi State Senate, and served in the 1916 session. In the 1918 session, he served in the newly added 41st district. He was re-elected to the Mississippi House of Representatives in 1919 and served there until 1924. He died in Biloxi, Mississippi, on October 2, 1924.

== Personal life ==
Johnson married three times. He first married Josephine Nelson in February 1871. He married Louisa C. Rouble in 1877. With her, he had a daughter who married Paul Smith. His third marriage was to Annie M. Kirkwood in 1880, and they had one son, named T. Ford.
