= Joseph N. Brown =

Mississippi politician

Member of the Mississippi State Senate from the 35th district
- In office January 1918 – February 1922
- Preceded by: John W. Barbee
- Succeeded by: B. E. Wilson

Personal details
- Born: October 2, 1849 Mount Pleasant, Mississippi, U.S.
- Died: February 1922 (aged 72) Memphis, Tennessee, U.S.
- Party: Democratic

Joseph Neal Brown (October 2, 1849 – February 1922) was an American politician. He was a Democratic member of the Mississippi State Senate, representing the state's 35th senatorial district from 1918 to 1922.

== Biography ==
Joseph Neal Brown was born on October 2, 1849, in Mount Pleasant, Mississippi. He was the son of George W. Brown and Ellen (Huffman) Brown. He was educated in the private schools of DeSoto County. He served as a member of the Board of Supervisors of DeSoto County, Mississippi, and he served some years as its president. He was elected to represent Mississippi's 35th senatorial district as a Democrat in the Mississippi State Senate in a 1916 special election after the resignation of incumbent senator John W. Barbee. He served in the 1918 session. In 1919, he was re-elected for the 1920–1924 term. After a two-week illness, Brown died in February 1922 at the Baptist Memorial Hospital in Memphis, Tennessee. He was succeeded in the position by B. E. Wilson.
