= William P. Stribling =

American lawyer

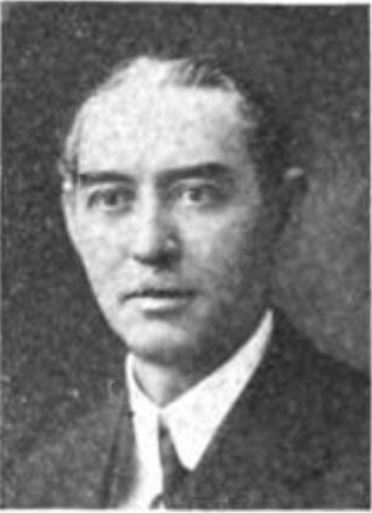
- c. 1917

Member of the Mississippi State Senate from the 25th district
- In office January 1916 – January 1920

Personal details
- Born: August 12, 1873 Fulton, Mississippi
- Died: December 22, 1947 (aged 74) Columbus, Mississippi
- Party: Democratic

William Pleasant Stribling (August 12, 1873 - December 22, 1947) was an American lawyer and Democratic politician. He was a member of the Mississippi State Senate from 1916 to 1920.

== Biography ==
William Pleasant Stribling was born on August 12, 1873, in Fulton, Mississippi. He was the son of Shelton Randolph Stribling and his wife, Mary Jane (Cates) Stribling. Stribling attended the public schools in Fulton. He decided to practice law and took the law course at the University of Mississippi. He then attended the Cumberland School of Law, graduating in 1896. After graduation, he was admitted to the bar and began practicing in Tupelo, Mississippi. He then went to practice law in Muskogee, Indian Territory (now Oklahoma) and Marlin, Texas, for a year. In 1904, he moved to Columbus, Mississippi, and continued practicing law there. In 1915, he was elected to represent the 25th District as a Democrat in the Mississippi State Senate for the 1916–1920 term. In 1920, he was a candidate to represent one of Mississippi's districts in the U. S. House of Representatives. Stribling died on December 22, 1947, at his home in Columbus, Mississippi.
