= Daniel W. Huff =

American politician

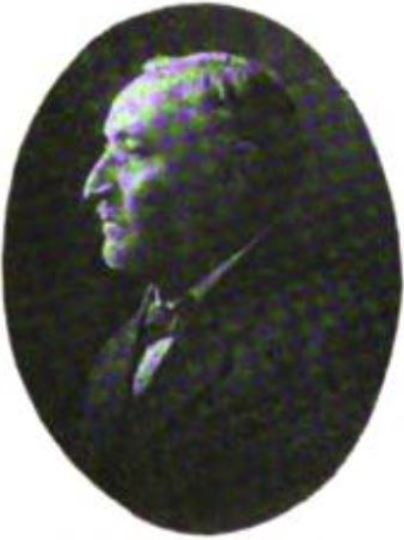
- c. 1917

Member of the Mississippi Senate from the 7th district
- In office January 1916 – January 1920

Member of the Mississippi House of Representatives from the Wilkinson County district
- In office January 1904 – January 1908

Personal details
- Born: September 20, 1854 Centreville, Mississippi
- Died: June 4, 1940 (aged 85) Centreville, Mississippi
- Party: Democratic

Daniel Webster Huff (September 20, 1854 - June 4, 1940) was a Democratic Mississippi state legislator in the early 20th century.

== Biography ==
Daniel Webster Huff was born on September 20, 1854, in Old Centreville, Amite County, Mississippi. He was the son of Holloway Huff and his wife, Caroline (Pomeroy) Huff. Daniel relocated to nearby Wilkinson County and became a cotton planter. He served as a member of the Board of Supervisors of Wilkinson County. In 1903, he was elected to the Mississippi House of Representatives, where he represented Wilkinson County as a Democrat from 1904 to 1908. In 1915, he was elected to the Mississippi State Senate, representing the state's 7th district. He died at his home in Centreville on June 4, 1940.

== Personal life ==
He was a Presbyterian. He married Mary Narcissus Lanehart in 1877. After her death, he remarried Birdie Albertine Whetstone in 1902. He had nine children, eight from his first marriage, and one from his second.
