= John Splann =

American Politician (1875–1962)

Member of the Mississippi House of Representatives from the Alcorn County district
- In office January 1916 – January 1920

Personal details
- Born: John Benjamin Splann; June 22, 1875 McNairy County, Tennessee, U.S.
- Died: March 24, 1962 (aged 86) Kendrick, Mississippi, U.S.
- Party: Democratic

John Benjamin Splann (June 22, 1875 – March 24, 1962) was a Democratic member of the Mississippi House of Representatives, representing Alcorn County, from 1916 to 1920.

== Biography ==
John Benjamin Splann was born on June 22, 1875, in McNairy County, Tennessee, to John Edwin Splann and Mollie N. (Howell) Splann. However, he grew up in nearby Corinth, Mississippi. He married Maude Potts in 1901. He was ordained a Christian minister in 1902. He was elected to the Mississippi House of Representatives to represent Alcorn County, as a Democrat, in 1915. He died on March 24, 1962, in Kendrick, Mississippi.
