= John W. Barbee =

American politician (1885–1956)

Member of the Mississippi State Senate from the 35th district
- In office January 1924 – January 1928
- Preceded by: B. E. Wilson
- In office January 1916 – January 1918
- Succeeded by: Joseph N. Brown

Member of the Mississippi House of Representatives from the DeSoto County district
- In office January 1912 – January 1916

Personal details
- Born: February 12, 1885 near Horn Lake, Mississippi, U.S.
- Died: September 2, 1956 (aged 71) Hernando, Mississippi, U.S.
- Party: Democratic

John Wesley Barbee Jr. (February 12, 1885 - September 2, 1956) was an American lawyer and Democratic politician. He was a member of the Mississippi Legislature from DeSoto County in the 1910s and 1920s.

== Early life ==
John Wesley Barbee Jr. was born on February 12, 1885, near Horn Lake, Mississippi. He was the son of John Wesley Barbee Sr., a former Ku Klux Klan member and Sheriff of DeSoto County, and Isabella McKamy (Frazier) Barbee. He was of Irish and Scottish descent. Barbee attended the public schools of DeSoto County before entering Bethel College in 1900. He spent one year (1902) at Mississippi A&M and graduated from Bethel with a B. S. degree in 1905. He then attended Cumberland University and received a L. L. B. degree in 1910.

== Professional career ==
Barbee started practicing law in May 1911. In November 1911, Barbee was elected to represent DeSoto County in the Mississippi House of Representatives, and he served from 1912 to 1916. In November 1915, Barbee was elected to represent the 35th District in the Mississippi State Senate for the 1916-1920 term. During his service, he was the Chairman of the Senate's Military Affairs Committee. In 1916, Barbee was a delegate to the year's Democratic National Convention. In 1917, when he was elected to the office of County Attorney of DeSoto County, Barbee resigned from the Senate and was replaced by Joseph Neal Brown. In 1923, Barbee was re-elected to the Senate for the 1924-1928 term. He was appointed to be a special State Circuit Court judge from September to November, 1926. From 1943 to 1948, he was the sheriff of DeSoto County.

== Personal life and death ==
Barbee was a member of the Presbyterian Church, and he was also a Freemason and a Knight of Pythias. He was a member of the Pi Kappa Alpha fraternity during college. He married Cora Edna Seitz in 1923. Barbee died after a long illness on September 2, 1956, in Hernando, Mississippi.
