= Dalton F. Warren =

Democratic member of the Mississippi House of Representatives

Member of the Mississippi House of Representatives from the DeSoto County district
- In office January 1916 – January 1920

Personal details
- Born: May 28, 1894 Olive Branch, Mississippi
- Died: November 30, 1942 (aged 48) Sparta, North Carolina
- Party: Democrat

Dalton Franklin Warren (May 28, 1894 – November 30, 1942) was a Democratic member of the Mississippi House of Representatives, representing DeSoto County, from 1916 to 1920.

== Biography ==
Dalton Franklin Warren was born on May 28, 1894, in Olive Branch, Mississippi. He was the son of William Marten Warren and Lydia Amelia (Brigance) Warren. He attended the public schools of DeSoto County. He attended Mississippi Heights Academy from 1910 to 1911 and graduated from DeSoto County Agricultural High School in 1913. He was the class anniversarian and class historian of his high school class. In November 1915, he was elected to represent DeSoto County as a Democrat in the Mississippi House of Representatives, and served from 1916 to 1920. He died of a heart attack in his residence in Sparta, North Carolina, on November 30, 1942.
