= Barney Semmelman =

German-American politician

Member of the Mississippi House of Representatives from the Clay County district
- In office January 3, 1916 – 1917

Personal details
- Born: January 22, 1877 Leutenberg, German Empire
- Died: July 3, 1925 (aged 48)

Barney Samuel Semmelman (January 22, 1877 – July 3, 1925) was a German-American politician and Democratic member of the Mississippi House of Representatives, representing Clay County, from 1916 to 1917.

== Biography ==
Barney Samuel Semmelman was born on January 22, 1877, in Leutenberg, German Empire. He was the son of Charles Semmelman and his wife Esther, who were paternal cousins. He was Jewish. He had an older brother, Herman, who died in 1912. The family moved to Brooklyn when Barney was about 10 years old. He and his brother came to Clay County, Mississippi, in 1898. He was a Captain of Company G of the 2nd Ind. Battalion of the Mississippi National Guard. He was elected to represent Clay County as a Democrat in the Mississippi House of Representatives in November 1915, receiving 866 out of 1300 total votes polled. He resigned from this position in 1917 to serve in the US Army during World War I. He died on July 3, 1925, and was buried in the Jewish section of the Friendship Cemetery in Columbus, Mississippi.
