= Richard E. Thompson =

American politician (1871–1928)

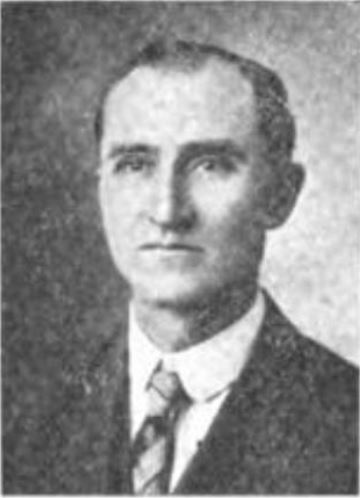
- c. 1917

Member of the Mississippi State Senate from the 14th district
- In office January 1916 – January 1920

Personal details
- Born: December 13, 1871 Toomsuba, Mississippi
- Died: 1928 (aged 56–57) Mississippi
- Party: Democratic

Richard Edgar Thompson (December 13, 1871 - 1928) was an American Democratic politician. He was a member of the Mississippi State Senate from 1916 to 1920.

== Biography ==
Richard Edgar Thompson was born on December 13, 1871, in Toomsuba, Mississippi. He was the son of John Daniel Thompson and Susan Jane (Camp) Thompson. He grew up in poverty and received his education from a country school. He continued to work on the farm and his father's shop until he became an assistant postmaster and railroad agent. He then served as Toomsuba's postmaster and, while serving in that office, established a Rural Free Delivery route there. Thompson was elected to represent the 14th district in the Mississippi State Senate in 1915 for the 1916–1920 term. Thompson died in 1928 in Mississippi.

== Personal life ==
Thompson was a Freemason and a member of the Presbyterian Church. In 1891, Thompson married Mollie Elizabeth Hurtt. In 1905, they adopted two children named Paul and Carl.
