= Walter G. Green =

American politician (1892–1962)

Member of the Mississippi House of Representatives from the Adams County district
- In office January 1916 – January 1920

Personal details
- Born: June 29, 1892 Natchez, Mississippi
- Died: June 26, 1962 (aged 69) Gulfport, Mississippi
- Party: Democrat

Walter Galloway Green (June 29, 1892 - June 26, 1962) was a Democratic member of the Mississippi House of Representatives, representing Adams County, from 1916 to 1920.

== Biography ==
Walter Galloway Green was born in Natchez, Mississippi, on June 29, 1892, to member of the Louisiana House of Representatives Thomas Keenan Green and Ellen Hay (Shotwell) Green. He was admitted to the bar in 1914. He was elected to the Mississippi House of Representatives, representing Adams County, in 1915. He died on June 26, 1962, in Gulfport, Mississippi.
