= Robert L. Ralston =

American politician

Member of the Mississippi House of Representatives from the Coahoma County district
- In office January 1916 – January 1920

Mayor of Coahoma, Mississippi
- In office January 27, 1898 – 1914

Personal details
- Born: February 12, 1860 Smyrna, TN
- Died: April 3, 1926 (aged 66) Memphis, TN
- Party: Democrat

Robert Locke Ralston (1860-1926) was a Democratic member of the Mississippi House of Representatives, representing Coahoma County, from 1916 to 1920.

== Biography ==
Robert Locke Ralston was born in Smyrna, Rutherford County, Tennessee, on February 12, 1860. He was the son of Robert Lock Ralston and Mary M. (Stephens) Ralston. The junior Robert was a farmer and a planter. He married Mary Elizabeth Shaw in 1891. On January 27, 1898, he was appointed the mayor of Coahoma, Mississippi, a position in which he served for 16 years. He was elected to the Mississippi House of Representatives as a Democrat to represent Coahoma County in November 1915, for the 1916–1920 term. Ralston died in Memphis, Tennessee, on April 3, 1926.
