= John A. Smylie =

American politician

Member of the Mississippi House of Representatives from the Copiah County district
- In office January 1916 – January 1920 Serving with George Washington Russell; Benjamin King Jr.

Personal details
- Born: July 26, 1861 Union County, Arkansas
- Died: October 9, 1946 (aged 85)
- Party: Democrat

John Alexander Smylie (July 26, 1861 – October 9, 1946) was a Democratic member of the Mississippi House of Representatives, representing Copiah County, from 1916 to 1920.

== Early life ==
John Alexander Smylie was born on July 26, 1861, in Union County, Arkansas. His parents were John Donan Smylie and Mary Jane (McCall) Smylie. His family moved back to the elder John Smylie's native Copiah County, Mississippi, when the younger John was 6 months old. His father, John Donan Smylie, had enlisted in the Confederate Army, and he died at the Battle of Iuka in 1862. John Alexander's mother died in 1863, leaving him an orphan. John Alexander Smylie was educated at various public schools. He graduated from the University of Mississippi with a B. A. degree in 1897. In 1905, he completed the law course at Millsaps College. He began practicing law in Hazlehurst 1905. He also was a teacher.

== Political career ==
While living in Crystal Springs, Smylie was first elected to the Mississippi House of Representatives, representing Copiah County as a Democrat, in November 1915, for the 1916–1920 term.

== Personal life and death ==
Smylie was married to Mamie Warren. They had three children, Alfred, Dorothy, and Robert.

Smylie died on October 9, 1946.
