= Battaille H. Wade =

American politician (1856–1926)

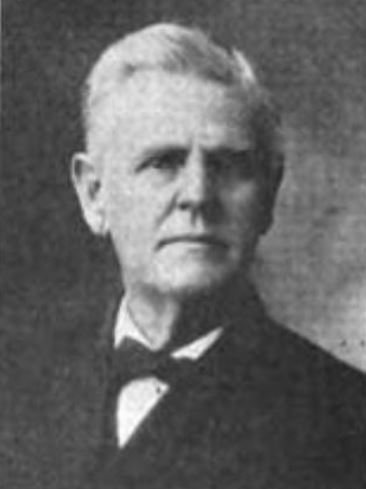
- c. 1917

Member of the Mississippi Senate from the 10th district
- In office January 1916 – January 1920

Personal details
- Born: September 14, 1856 Jefferson County, MS
- Died: August 11, 1926 (aged 69)
- Party: Democrat

Battaille Harrison Wade (September 14, 1856 – August 11, 1926) was a Democratic member of the Mississippi State Senate, representing the state's 10th senatorial district, from 1916 to 1920.

Battaille Harrison Wade was born on September 14, 1856, in Jefferson County, Mississippi. He was the son of Isaac Ross Wade and Catherine E. Dunbar. Wade attended private and then public schools in Jefferson County. In 1915, he was elected to represent Mississippi's 10th senatorial district as a Democrat in the Mississippi State Senate. He served from 1916 to 1920. He died on August 11, 1926.
