= Peter Stubblefield =

American politician from Mississippi (1888–1966)

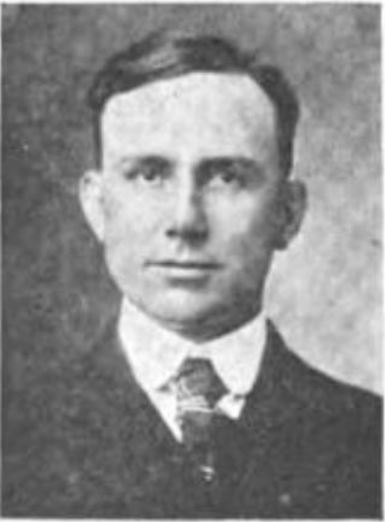
- c. 1917

Member of the Mississippi State Senate from the 19th district
- In office January 1932 – January 1940
- In office January 1916 – January 1920

Personal details
- Born: March 12, 1888 Yazoo County, MS
- Died: October 7, 1966 (aged 78) Vaughan, Mississippi
- Party: Democrat

Peter Stubblefield (March 12, 1888 – October 7, 1966) was an American farmer and politician. He was a Democratic member of the Mississippi Senate, representing the state's 19th senatorial district (Yazoo County), from 1916 to 1920 and from 1932 to 1940.

== Early life ==
Peter Stubblefield was born on March 12, 1888, near Vaughn in Yazoo County, Mississippi. He was the son of Simon Peter Stubblefield, a Confederate Civil War veteran, and Elizabeth (Watlington) Stubblefield. Stubblefield attended the community schools of Yazoo County, and attended Mississippi College from 1903 to 1905. He then attended the University of Mississippi, graduating with a B. S. degree in 1908. He then took a post graduate course in the College of Political Science at Washington University in St. Louis.

== Political career ==
From 1911 to 1912, Stubblefield was a clerk for U. S. Senator from Mississippi John Sharp Williams. Stubblefield was elected to the Mississippi Senate, representing the 19th senatorial district composed of Yazoo County as a Democrat, in November 1915. He served in that position from 1916 to 1920, also fighting in World War I. He then served in the Senate for the same district from 1932 to 1940, being re-elected in 1936.

== Later life ==
Stubblefield died in his sleep in his home in Vaughan, Mississippi, on October 7, 1966.
