= Charles E. Thompson =

American politician and jurist (1889–1986)

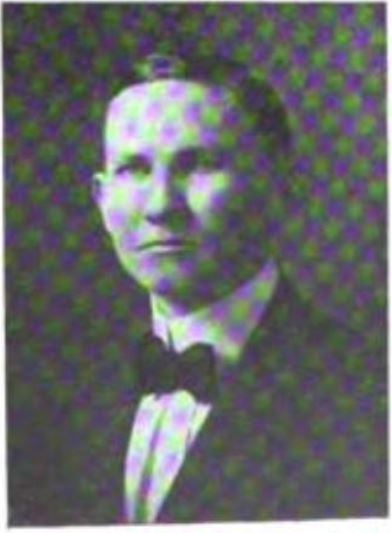
- c. 1917

Member of the Mississippi Senate from the 6th district
- In office January 1916 – January 1920

Personal details
- Born: March 7, 1889 Franklin County, Mississippi, U.S.
- Died: July 16, 1986 (aged 97) Hidalgo County, Texas, US
- Party: Democratic

Charles Ernest Thompson (March 7, 1889 – July 16, 1986) was an American politician and jurist. He was a Democratic member of the Mississippi Senate, representing the state's 6th senatorial district, from 1916 to 1920.

== Biography ==
Charles Ernest Thompson was born on March 7, 1889 in Garden City,Franklin County, Mississippi. He was the son of Pharaoh Carter Thompson and Mary Sam (Marshall) Thompson. He had Welsh ancestry.

Thompson was educated under private tutors. He graduated from Mississippi College with a B. S. in 1914. In November 1915, Thompson was elected to represent Mississippi's 6th senatorial district as a Democrat in the Mississippi State Senate. He served in the 1916–1920 term. While still a state senator, he entered the University of Mississippi in 1916 and graduated with a L.L.B. in 1917. He was admitted to the bar the same year. He practiced law in Greenville, Mississippi with his partner S. N. McWhorter before they moved together to Weslaco, Texas in 1925. McAllen, Texas. From 1931 to 1932, he was a judge of Texas's 93rd district court.

Thompson died on July 16, 1986, in Hidalgo County, Texas, while residing in McAllen.
