= Henry Clay Yawn =

American politician

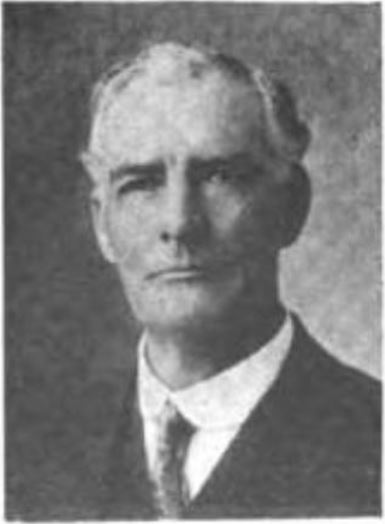
- c. 1917

Member of the Mississippi Senate from the 40th district 4th (1916-1917)
- In office January 1928 – January 1932
- In office January 1916 – January 1920

Personal details
- Born: July 5, 1859 Columbia, Alabama
- Died: August 3, 1936 (aged 77) New Orleans, Louisiana
- Party: Democrat
- Children: 5

Henry Clay Yawn (July 5, 1859 - August 3, 1936) was a Democratic member of the Mississippi Senate from 1916 to 1920 and from 1928 to 1932.

== Early life ==
Henry Clay Yawn was born on July 5, 1859, in Columbia, Alabama. He was the son of Greenbury Yawn and Melinda (Yawn) Yawn. He was the only son of five children. Yawn attended the rural schools of Covington County. He attended Mount Carmel and Columbia High Schools. He took a commercial course and taught at high schools in Columbia, Lumberton, and Purvis. In 1891, he became the assistant superintendent of the Lumberton schools. He became the town treasurer of Lumberton.

== Political career ==
In November 1915, he was elected to represent Mississippi's 4th senatorial district as a Democrat in the Mississippi Senate from 1916 to 1920. After the senate districts were redistricted in 1917, he was moved to the 40th district in the 1918 session. He was a Prohibitionist. He did not seek re-election until 1927, when he was elected to the Mississippi Senate again for the 40th district to serve from 1928 to 1932. He died on August 3, 1936, in New Orleans, Louisiana.

== Personal life ==
Yawn married art teacher Frances "Fannie" Lee Limbaugh, who he met while being the Lumberton assistant superintendent, on August 2, 1893. They had five children: Gladys, born May 8, 1894; Frances Lois, born August 22, 1897; Henry Clay Junior, born December 5, 1899; Howard Hinton, born February 15, 1901; and Rosalind, born December 13, 1904. All five children survived Henry Sr. when he died.
