= John F. Cassels =

American politician

Member of the Mississippi House of Representatives from the Amite County district
- In office January 1916 – January 1920

Personal details
- Born: October 27, 1852 Wilkinson County, Mississippi, U.S.
- Died: June 2, 1930 (aged 77) Mississippi, U.S.
- Party: Democrat

John Franklin Cassels (October 27, 1852 – June 2, 1930) was an American politician who served as a Democratic member of the Mississippi House of Representatives, representing Amite County, from 1916 to 1920.

== Biography ==
John Franklin Cassels was born on October 27, 1852, near Mt. Carmel, in Wilkinson County, Mississippi. His parents were John Cassels and Sarah Nix (Collinsworth) Cassels. He married Lettie Virginia Jackson in 1879. In 1915, he was elected to the Mississippi House of Representatives, representing Amite County, as a Democrat. He died on June 2, 1930, in Mississippi, and was buried in Amite County.
