= Van Buren Boddie =

American politician

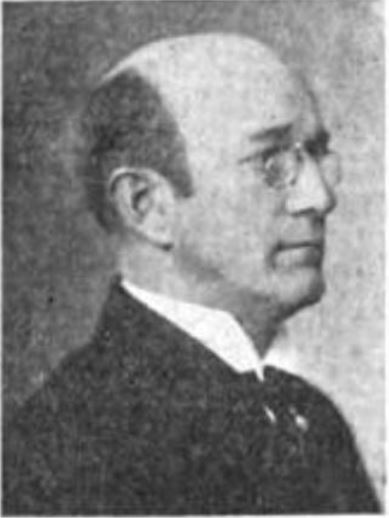
- c. 1917

Member of the Mississippi Senate from the 29th district
- In office January 1928 – 1928
- Succeeded by: John L. Hebron
- In office January 1912 – January 1920

Member of the Mississippi House of Representatives from the Washington County district
- In office 1906 – January 1912
- In office 1902 – January 1904

Personal details
- Born: January 20, 1869 Memphis, TN
- Died: May 11, 1928 (aged 59) Greenville, MS
- Party: Democrat

Van Buren Boddie (January 20, 1869 - May 11, 1928) was a Democratic Mississippi state legislator in the early 20th century.

== Biography ==
Van Buren Boddie was born on January 20, 1869, in Memphis, Tennessee. He was the son of Van Buren Boddie and Anna (Jewell) Boddie. He did not go to college, but he studied law at the law firm of William Yeger and LeRoy Percy in Greenville. He was admitted to the bar in 1892 and opened a practice in Greenville. He was first appointed to the Mississippi House of Representatives, as a Democrat, in 1902, to fill in for the unfinished term of F. E. Larkin. In 1906, he was appointed to fill in for the term of Percy Bell. He served on the judiciary, levee, and penitentiary committees that year. He was first elected to the House in 1907, and served from 1908 to 1912. All three stints were for representing Washington County. In 1911, he was elected to the Mississippi State Senate to represent the state's 29th district. He was re-elected in 1915. After this, he was partners in a law firm with fellow state senator Hazlewood Power Farish. He was elected to serve in the Senate from 1928 to 1932, but resigned in the 1928 session because of illness. He died on May 11, 1928, in his home in Greenville, Mississippi.
