= Tornado outbreak of March 24–27, 2023 =

2023 severe weather outbreak in the Southern U.S

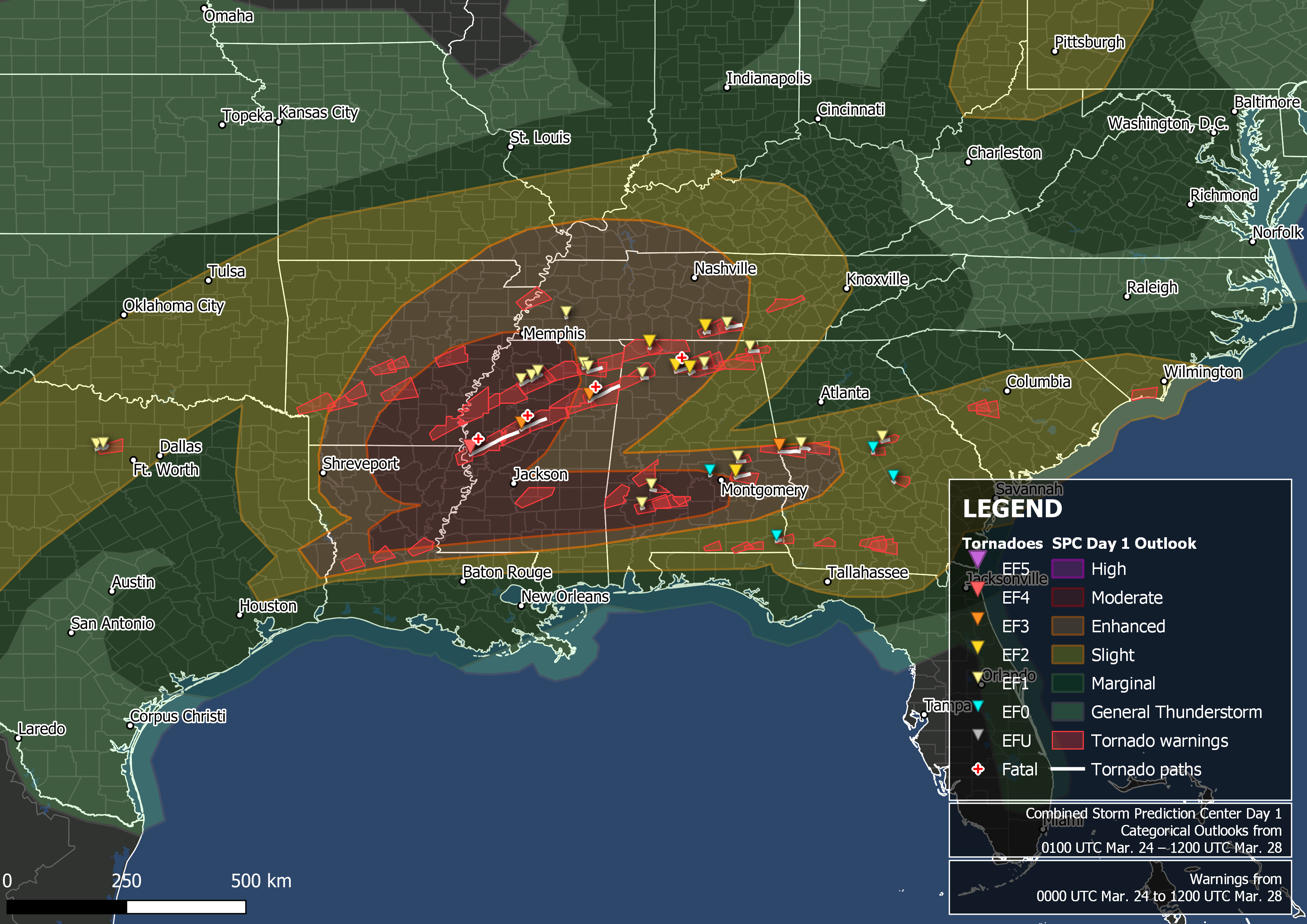
- Map of tornado warnings and confirmed tornadoes from the outbreak

Meteorological history
- Duration: March 24–27, 2023

Tornado outbreak
- Tornadoes: 35
- Max. rating: EF4 tornado
- Highest winds: Tornadic – 195 mph (314 km/h) (Rolling Fork, Mississippi EF4 on March 24)
- Highest gusts: Non-tornadic – 85 mph (137 km/h) (Wears Valley, Tennessee straight-line winds on March 25); Estimated non-tornadic – 88 mph (142 km/h) (Florence, Alabama straight-line winds on March 24)

Winter storm
- Largest hail: 2.75 in (7.0 cm); Burkburnett, Texas on March 23; multiple places in Alabama on March 25; multiple places across Mississippi and Georgia on March 26
- Max. snowfall: 20 in (51 cm); Menasha, Wisconsin

Overall effects
- Fatalities: 23 fatalities (+2 non-tornadic) 236 injuries
- Damage: $1.9 billion
- Areas affected: Texas, Mississippi, Alabama, Tennessee, Georgia
- Power outages: ≥80,000
- Part of the tornado outbreaks of 2023 and 2022–23 North American winter

On March 24, 2023, a severe weather and tornado outbreak began across portions of the lower Mississippi River Valley in the United States. A slow-moving trough moved eastward across the United States and interacted with a moist and unstable airmass originating from the Gulf of Mexico, resulting in widespread heavy rainfall, severe thunderstorms, and significant tornadoes over a four-day period. A violent, high-end EF4 tornado moved through the towns of Rolling Fork, Midnight, and Silver City in western Mississippi, causing catastrophic damage and many fatalities. Multiple tornado emergencies were issued for that tornado and two subsequent EF3 tornadoes from the same supercell that struck Winona and Amory.

Severe weather and tornadic activity continued into the early morning hours of March 25, as a squall line of severe storms with embedded circulations moved eastward across Tennessee and Alabama. A low-end EF2 tornado within the line killed a person in the northern part of Hartselle, Alabama. The slow-moving storm system then stalled the following day, producing more severe weather and tornadoes across portions of Alabama and Georgia from March 26 to March 27, including a couple of strong tornadoes. The outbreak also resulted in numerous reports of damaging straight-line winds, hail, and flooding.

== Meteorological synopsis ==
=== March 24–25 ===
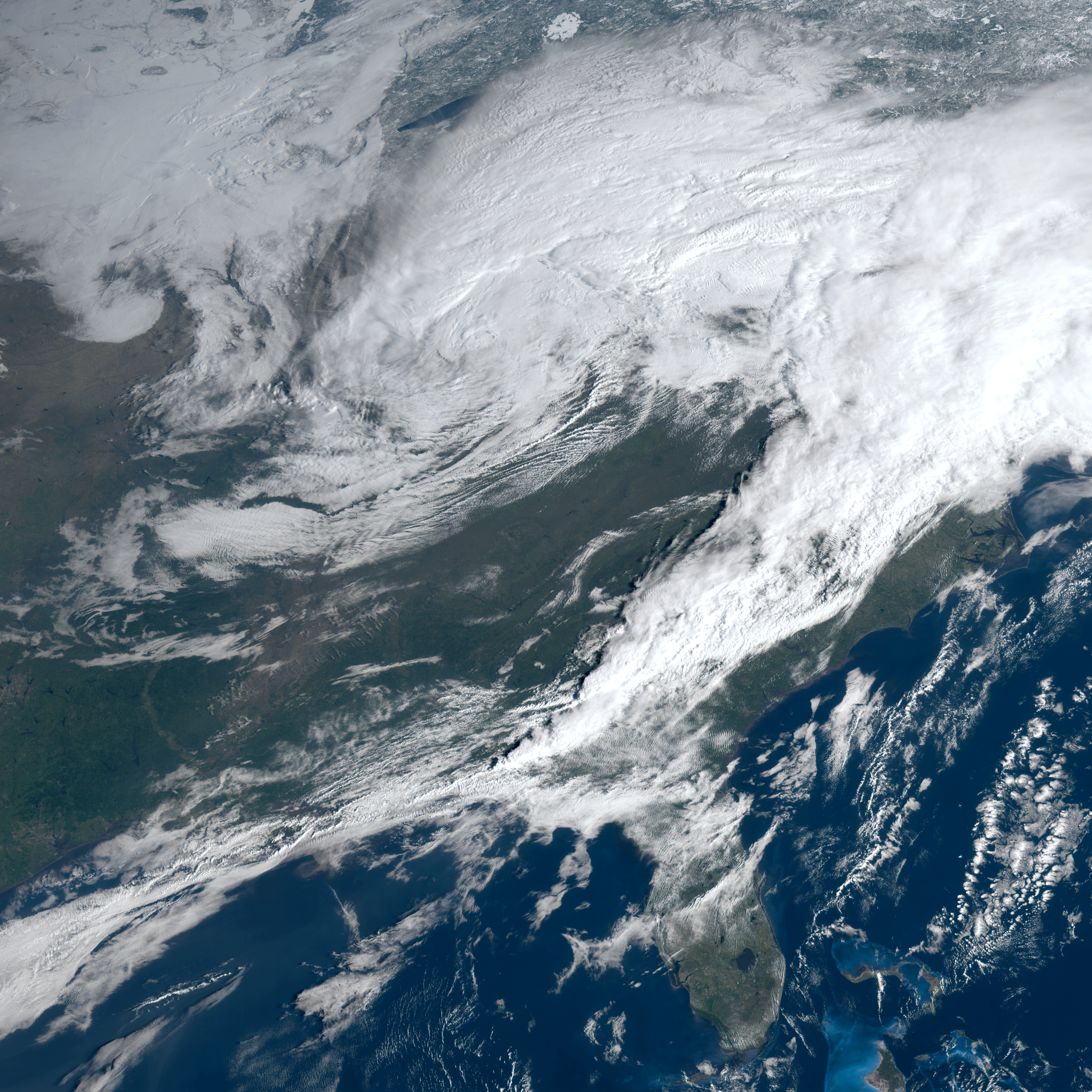
GOES-16 satellite image of the storm system responsible for the tornado outbreak across the Southern United States at 14:06 UTC (9:06 a.m. CDT) on March 25

On March 18, the Storm Prediction Center (SPC) first indicated the potential for organized severe weather across the Southern Plains in advance of an upper-level trough across the Western United States. Additional risk areas were issued to the east in later outlooks, concurrent with the eastward-moving trough. By March 23, a level 2/Slight risk was hoisted from Texas northeastward into Missouri, primarily for the threat of large hail. Scattered reports of large hail and damaging wind gusts were received from Texas across into the Mid-Atlantic states. In addition, two EF1 tornadoes occurred in Parker County, Texas, during the early morning hours of March 24.

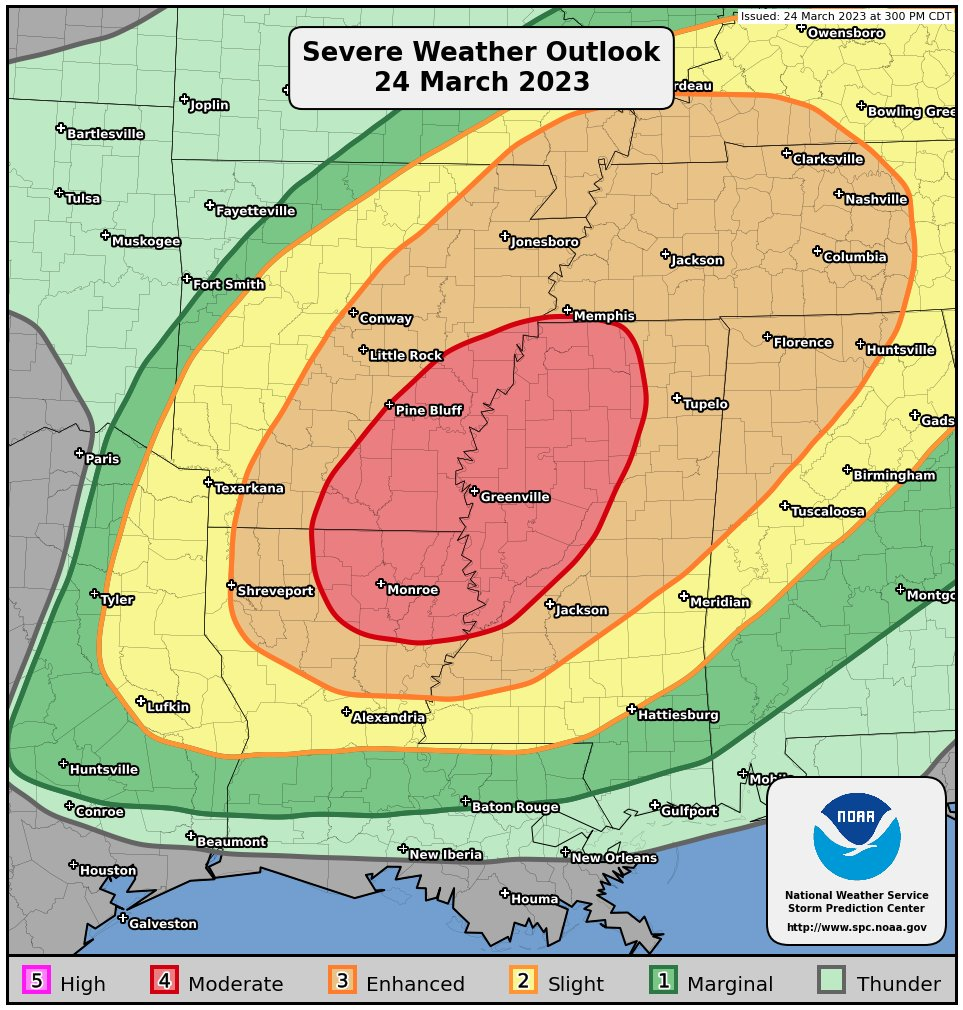
The Storm Prediction Center’s Severe Weather Outlook for March 24, 2023.

Farther to the east across the lower Mississippi River Valley, a more substantial threat for severe weather unfolded. On March 22, the SPC issued a level 3/Enhanced risk of severe weather across portions of Louisiana, Arkansas, and Mississippi, for supercell thunderstorms capable of large hail, damaging winds, and strong (EF2+) tornadoes. The Enhanced risk was expanded northward the following day, and the original outlined area was upgraded to a level 4/Moderate risk. On the morning of March 24, water vapor imagery depicted a potent mid-level trough over northern portions of the Baja California peninsula. The trough was expected to move quickly eastward, accompanied by strong mid-level winds between the trough and strong high-pressure area across the Southeastern United States. Meanwhile, a rapidly deepening low-pressure area was expected to drag a warm front northward, leading to a broad, unstable air mass to its south. Although some reduction in moisture was expected across Mississippi due to drier air aloft and warm surface temperatures into the 80s °F, continued advection of moist air from the Gulf of Mexico seemed supportive of dewpoints in the upper 60's and lower 70's across Louisiana, Arkansas, and Mississippi by the evening hours. Thus, mixed-layer convective available potential energy was expected to rise into the 1,500–2,000 J/kg range. Initial forecaster thinking was that strong forcing for ascent across Arkansas would lead to an organized squall line capable of both tornadoes and damaging winds, whereas more discrete supercells would be possible farther south, particularly along north–south oriented confluence bands in the open warm sector. A tornado watch was issued shortly thereafter at 5:15 p.m. CDT for portions of eastern Arkansas, northeastern Louisiana, central and northern Mississippi, and western Tennessee. The watch mentioned the possibility of several strong to intense tornadoes with any persistent supercells.

NEXRAD radar loop of the EF4 Rolling Fork–Midnight–Silver City, Mississippi tornado

Clusters of storms evolved along these bands in conjunction with improving wind shear profiles. However, given their displacement from the surface low and better forcing, there was some uncertainty as to whether they would become better organized. A strengthening low-level jet and surface moisture increased confidence in the maturation of these cells, but tornadic development had not yet begun in the area as of 0000 UTC. At their 0100 UTC outlook, the SPC lowered the probability of tornadoes to a 10% hatched tornado area, thus downgrading the moderate risk to an enhanced risk, citing that instability in the area was weaker than expected and that there was increased confidence in only limited buoyancy developing. However, as the update was being issued, a significant supercell evolved across western Mississippi, producing a violent, long-tracked, and deadly high-end EF4 tornado that struck Rolling Fork, Midnight, and Silver City, inflicting catastrophic damage, and causing over a dozen fatalities. Although this supercell became embedded within a line segment, it soon produced another deadly tornado of EF3 strength that impacted Black Hawk and Winona, followed by another deadly EF3 tornado that struck New Wren and Amory. To the north, an organized line of convection with embedded supercells moved across Tennessee and Alabama, and although its strength was inhibited by lower moisture and a lack of robust instability, it still produced damaging winds and several additional tornadoes into the early morning hours of March 25, including a low-end EF2 tornado that caused a fatality in the northern part of Hartselle, Alabama. A few lingering severe storms continued into the afternoon hours, resulting in two more weak EF0 tornadoes that occurred in southern Alabama and Georgia.

=== March 26–27 ===
After the weather system responsible for the outbreak became stalled within the atmospheric region centered around central Mississippi and Alabama throughout March 25, the focus shifted to a new corridor for severe weather potential setting up across many of the same areas on March 26. In this corridor, which extended from Louisiana into western Georgia, CAPE values reaching into the 1500–2000 J/kg range, effective 50-knot wind shear, and elevated dew points were present, allowing for a favorable environment for the re-intensification of the system, and its segmentation into individual supercells. As such, the SPC issued a 4/5 moderate risk for this corridor at their 1630 UTC outlook, driven by both a 15%, hatched contour for strong (EF2+) tornadoes for the strongest cells and a 45%, hatched contour for very large (2+ inch diameter) hail. A 30% risk of damaging winds was specified in this outlook. On the morning of March 26, supercells quickly developed, one of which produced an EF3 tornado that caused major damage in North West Point, Georgia. Additional significant tornadoes were expected to occur across portions of the threat area farther west, though mostly isolated weak tornadoes occurred. One EF2 tornado caused significant tree damage as it passed near Catherine, Alabama. However, these storms did produce widespread large to very large hail up to the size of baseballs (2.75 in (7.0 cm)) along with dozens of damaging wind reports. A few additional isolated supercells continued into the early morning hours of March 27, one of which produced an EF2 tornado that struck Milstead, Alabama. A couple of additional weak tornadoes touched down before the outbreak came to an end.

== Confirmed tornadoes ==
Confirmed tornadoes by Enhanced Fujita rating
EFU	EF0	EF1	EF2	EF3	EF4	EF5	Total
0	4	21	6	3	1	0	35

=== March 24 event ===
List of confirmed tornadoes – Friday, March 24, 2023 (Note: All dates are based on the local time zone where the tornado touched down; however, all times are in Coordinated Universal Time for consistency.)
EF#	Location	County / parish	State	Start coord.	Time (UTC)	Path length	Max. width
EF1	SW of Whitt to NW of Poolville	Parker	TX	32.9467°N 98.0363°W	09:52–09:58	6.73 mi (10.83 km)	75 yd (69 m)
EF1	As the tornado touched down, a large RV was rolled upside down, injuring two people. Elsewhere along the path, the roof of a metal building was damaged and another RV was rolled over. Multiple large trees were snapped along the tornado's path as well.						
EF1	Northwestern Poolville	Parker, Wise	TX	32.9597°N 97.91°W	09:56–10:00	5.47 mi (8.80 km)	100 yd (91 m)
EF1	A few houses sustained roof and siding damage and a metal garage structure was uplifted and overturned. A large, covered pavilion roof was completely collapsed while several outbuildings and multiple manufactured homes were damaged. Extensive damage to trees occurred in and around town as well. Three people were injured.						
EF4	SW of Rolling Fork to Midnight to NE of Silver City	Issaquena, Sharkey, Humphreys, Holmes	MS	32.8414°N 90.9993°W	00:57–02:08	59.41 mi (95.61 km)	1,320 yd (1,210 m)
EF4	17 deaths – See article on this tornado – 165 people were injured.						
EF1	ESE of Eurekaton	Haywood	TN	35.4248°N 89.1976°W	01:19–01:20	0.26 mi (0.42 km)	70 yd (64 m)
EF1	A house, barn, and an outbuilding sustained roof damage as a result of this brief tornado. Numerous trees were snapped or uprooted, including one that fell on a residence and inflicted severe roof damage.						
EF1	E of Crowder to NE of Pope	Panola	MS	34.1625°N 90.0458°W	01:25–01:34	8.39 mi (13.50 km)	100 yd (91 m)
EF1	This tornado touched down to the east of Crowder and moved to the northeast, snapping or uprooting trees. The tornado then moved through Pope, where minor roof damage occurred and additional trees were downed, one of which landed on a house and caused structural damage. The tornado exited Pope and caused minor damage to an outbuilding before dissipating.						
EF1	E of Courtland	Panola	MS	34.2381°N 89.8482°W	01:38–01:44	6.18 mi (9.95 km)	150 yd (140 m)
EF1	Numerous trees were snapped or uprooted and a few utility poles were downed. Homes and outbuildings sustained minor damage as well.						
EF1	W of Burgess	Panola, Lafayette	MS	34.3219°N 89.7309°W	01:47–01:51	3.94 mi (6.34 km)	125 yd (114 m)
EF1	Sporadic but significant tree damage occurred along the path while barns and outbuildings sustained minor structural damage.						
EF3	SW of Black Hawk to Southern Winona to SSW of Lodi	Carroll, Montgomery	MS	33.31°N 90.04°W	02:12–02:42	29.43 mi (47.36 km)	1,250 yd (1,140 m)
EF3	3 deaths – See section on this tornado – Five people were injured.						
EF1	N of Blue Springs	Union	MS	34.4721°N 88.8706°W	02:38–02:39	0.73 mi (1.17 km)	125 yd (114 m)
EF1	A brief low-end EF1 tornado damaged an outbuilding and a patio at a residence and inflicted roof damage to a few other homes. Numerous trees were snapped or uprooted and one man was injured when a tree fell on his vehicle.						
EF1	S of Jug Fork to Southern Guntown to ESE of Baldwyn	Lee	MS	34.4021°N 88.7862°W	02:45–02:57	14.66 mi (23.59 km)	250 yd (230 m)
EF1	A tornado touched down in the rural community of Birmingham and moved to the northeast, snapping or uprooting trees, damaging outbuildings and the roofs of homes, and destroying a carport at one residence. It then struck the south side of Guntown, where more trees were downed, two large sheds were destroyed, and a couple of homes were damaged, one of which had an exterior wall shifted. Additional damage to trees and an outbuilding occurred further along the path before the tornado dissipated.						
EF3	SW of Egypt to Amory to E of Turon	Chickasaw, Monroe, Itawamba	MS	33.8527°N 88.7576°W	03:38–04:09	36.56 mi (58.84 km)	1,600 yd (1,500 m)
EF3	2 deaths – See article on this tornado – 55 people were injured.						
EF2	Northeastern Florence	Lauderdale	AL	34.8086°N 87.6553°W	03:54–04:02	3.82 mi (6.15 km)	300 yd (270 m)
EF2	A strong tornado caused significant damage in the Blackberry Trail Golf Course subdivision where multiple homes were heavily damaged and had large portions of their roofs torn off. A few had damage to exterior walls as well. One home had two rooms with all of its exterior walls collapsed and another residence had its front exterior wall bowed outward.						
EF1	NNW of Anderson	Lauderdale	AL	34.9685°N 87.2904°W	04:14–04:18	4.07 mi (6.55 km)	120 yd (110 m)
EF1	A house sustained roof damage and had its garage destroyed. Trees were uprooted and snapped as well.						
EF1	Northern Bear Creek	Marion	AL	34.2781°N 87.7661°W	04:44−04:49	5.19 mi (8.35 km)	275 yd (251 m)
EF1	A house was heavily damaged by this high-end EF1 tornado and a few others were damaged to a lesser degree. A large barn was destroyed with its debris strewn across a road and some outbuildings were damaged. A pontoon boat and trailer were moved 25 yd (23 m) and numerous trees were snapped or uprooted along the path as well.						
EF2	Fayetteville	Lincoln	TN	35.1454°N 86.5794°W	04:59–05:05	3.96 mi (6.37 km)	300 yd (270 m)
EF2	This low-end EF2 tornado moved directly through Fayetteville. Lincoln Medical Center was hit by the tornado, which had facade and a rooftop HVAC unit torn off and also sustained damage to an exterior wall. Cars in the parking lot were flipped or had windows blown out. At the Lincoln County Fairgrounds, horse stables had reinforced roofing torn off, some warehouse buildings were heavily damaged, and a large shed was completely destroyed with 4x4 wooden anchors snapped off at ground level. A few other outbuilding structures on the property were damaged or destroyed and a horse trailer was rolled 80 yd (73 m). Homes in the city had roofing and siding removed, trees and power poles were snapped, and light poles were knocked over. Some businesses also sustained roof, window, and exterior damage, and pieces of wood were speared into the ground. The tornado exited Fayetteville and continued to the east, downing more trees and damaging or destroying a couple of outbuildings before dissipating.						

=== March 25 event ===
List of confirmed tornadoes – Saturday, March 25, 2023
EF#	Location	County / parish	State	Start coord.	Time (UTC)	Path length	Max. width
EF1	NE of Haleyville	Lawrence	AL	34.34°N 87.473°W	05:00–05:06	2.76 mi (4.44 km)	130 yd (120 m)
EF1	High-resolution satellite imagery revealed an EF1 tornado that uprooted numerous trees in the Bankhead National Forest.						
EF2	WSW of Danville to Northern Hartselle	Lawrence, Morgan	AL	34.4016°N 87.1348°W	05:23–05:29	13.53 mi (21.77 km)	175 yd (160 m)
EF2	1 death – This tornado developed southwest of Danville, causing minor roof damage to chicken houses before moving through town. The scoreboard at the Danville High School football field was partially destroyed, some buildings had metal roofing peeled back, and sporadic tree damage was noted. It moved to the northeast away from Danville, downing countless trees, inflicting considerable damage to homes and outbuildings and destroying a carport. The tornado reached its peak intensity as it moved through the north side of Hartselle, where a well-anchored mobile home was torn off its foundation and destroyed, killing the occupant. Homes had roofing material and carports torn off and many large trees and power poles were snapped in town as well. The tornado dissipated as it moved out of town.						
EF1	W of Estill Springs	Franklin	TN	35.2258°N 86.1708°W	05:24–05:39	15.26 mi (24.56 km)	240 yd (220 m)
EF1	Homes and farm buildings sustained roof damage as a result of this intermittent low-end EF1 tornado. Many trees were snapped or uprooted along the path as well.						
EF2	E of Falkville	Morgan	AL	34.367°N 86.8713°W	05:33–05:36	4.94 mi (7.95 km)	125 yd (114 m)
EF2	A log cabin-style home had part of its roof torn off, power poles were snapped, and countless large trees were snapped or uprooted as this tornado moved through wooded areas. A large and well-anchored pole barn was completely destroyed and 500 lb (230 kg) hay bales were thrown long distances from the structure. Another barn was damaged and a camper was hit by a fallen tree before the tornado moved into a heavily wooded area that was inaccessible to the damage survey team.						
EF1	WNW of Union Grove	Morgan	AL	34.4758°N 86.6003°W	05:47–05:50	2.09 mi (3.36 km)	325 yd (297 m)
EF1	Numerous trees were uprooted and the roofs of chicken houses were damaged.						
EF1	NW of Flat Rock to N of Cartersville	Jackson, DeKalb	AL	34.7856°N 85.7393°W	06:28–06:36	8.51 mi (13.70 km)	250 yd (230 m)
EF1	The tornado touched down north of Flat Rock where multiple chicken houses sustained roof damage and numerous softwood trees were uprooted. In DeKalb County, minor roof damage to a single-family home occurred. More trees were uprooted and power poles were tilted before the tornado lifted. (Note: These reports incorrectly label the tornado as an EF0)						
EF0	N of Ashford to SW of Columbia	Houston	AL	31.2144°N 85.2388°W	14:00–14:10	4.46 mi (7.18 km)	50 yd (46 m)
EF0	A metal outbuilding was destroyed, a wooden storage building collapsed, and several homes sustained minor damage to their roofs and siding. A large but diseased tree fell onto a double-wide manufactured home, significantly damaging the structure.						
EF0	Cadwell	Laurens	GA	32.3410°N 83.0395°W	20:17–20:19	1.5 mi (2.4 km)	100 yd (91 m)
EF0	This weak tornado touched down in Cadwell, where a manufactured home had its porch roof lifted off and a shed was destroyed. The tornado also caused damage to trees. (Note: The 1st report is an incorrect duplication of the 2nd report)						

=== March 26 event ===
List of confirmed tornadoes – Sunday, March 26, 2023
EF#	Location	County / parish	State	Start coord.	Time (UTC)	Path length	Max. width
EF3	NW of West Point to NE of Pine Mountain	Troup, Meriwether	GA	32.8984°N 85.1856°W	10:49–11:19	21.7 mi (34.9 km)	500 yd (460 m)
EF3	See section on this tornado – Five people were injured.						
EF1	Northern Milledgeville	Baldwin	GA	33.0864°N 83.2502°W	11:40–11:50	7 mi (11 km)	250 yd (230 m)
EF1	A tornado developed and moved through the north side of Milledgeville, causing damage to numerous homes, businesses, industrial buildings, and trees. At the Atrium Health Navicent Baldwin Hospital, windows were shattered and a large part of the hospital's roof and covered walkway collapsed. Northside Baptist Church had siding removed and its back wall was partially blown out and an HVAC unit was torn from the structure and thrown into the parking lot. A trailer was thrown into a warehouse, cars were damaged by flying debris, and some semi-trailers were overturned. A billboard was destroyed and many trees were snapped or uprooted in town, some of which landed on homes.						
EF1	SE of Camden (1st tornado)	Wilcox	AL	31.94°N 87.22°W	00:27–00:30	1.17 mi (1.88 km)	500 yd (460 m)
EF1	A high-end EF1 tornado touched down just southeast of a small lake in between several dirt roads. The tornado moved due north on the right side of the lake and dirt road, expanding rapidly in width and uprooting or snapping many softwood and hardwood trees. The tornado started moving northeast after this point, quickly beginning an occlusion to the north and northwest, which was clearly evident with a narrow convergent path of uprooted visible on high-resolution satellite imagery. This was the first of three tornadoes from this cyclical supercell in southern Alabama. It was initially believed to have been one continuous tornado, but a reanalysis concluded that three separate tornadoes touched down.						
EF1	SE of Camden (2nd tornado)	Wilcox	AL	31.95°N 87.21°W	00:30	1.05 mi (1.69 km)	300 yd (270 m)
EF1	This tornado began immediately as the prior tornado above quickly occluded and dissipated off to the northwest, leaving a narrow swath of uprooted trees. It continued to the east before it rapidly began occluding and turned northward, nearly completing a full cyclonic loop back to the southwest before it dissipated. High-resolution satellite imagery which allowed for the distinction of this tornado from the other two tornadoes in its vicinity. This was the second of three tornadoes from this cyclical supercell in southern Alabama. It was initially believed to have been one continuous tornado event, but a reanalysis concluded that three separate tornadoes touched down.						
EF1	SE of Camden (3rd tornado)	Wilcox	AL	31.95°N 87.21°W	00:30–00:32	3.31 mi (5.33 km)	300 yd (270 m)
EF1	This tornado quickly grew in size and intensified as it curved to the north. Based on high-resolution satellite imagery, numerous trees were uprooted and snapped at high-end EF1 intensity. The tornado narrowed as it moved over Pursley Creek and weakened, downing a couple of trees and damaging power lines before lifting. This was last of three tornadoes from this cyclical supercell in southern Alabama. It was initially believed to have been one continuous tornado event, but a reanalysis concluded that three separate tornadoes touched down.						
EF1	N of Fulton	Clarke	AL	31.8318°N 87.7742°W	01:24–01:26	1.67 mi (2.69 km)	340 yd (310 m)
EF1	A well-built house sustained minor damage, a shed had its overhang blown off, and another shed was overturned onto its roof. A ski boat and a trailer were pushed over and blown down a hill, and numerous trees were snapped or uprooted as well.						
EF2	SW of Catherine	Marengo, Wilcox	AL	32.182°N 87.595°W	01:33–01:40	6 mi (9.7 km)	750 yd (690 m)
EF2	Numerous large trees were snapped and uprooted, and two gates were damaged.						
EF0	Western Prattville	Autauga	AL	32.448°N 86.492°W	02:39–02:41	1.03 mi (1.66 km)	200 yd (180 m)
EF0	Trees and limbs were blown down, metal panels were blown off a business, and power poles and lines were downed by falling trees on the west side of Prattville.						
EF1	Lake Martin	Elmore, Tallapoosa	AL	32.7106°N 85.969°W	03:22–03:29	7.47 mi (12.02 km)	1,200 yd (1,100 m)
EF1	This large high-end EF1 tornado touched down in a wooded area in northeastern Elmore County, where it immediately snapped or uprooted many trees. More trees were downed when the tornado crossed a portion of the lake into the Castaway Island area, where several homes and structures were damaged by falling trees. At The Ridge subdivision, three to four homes sustained considerable roof and siding damage, and many surrounding trees were blown down. A couple of concrete electric transmission poles were downed as well. The tornado then crossed an inaccessible and uninhabited island before moving into Tallapoosa County, where only sporadic tree damage occurred in a few neighborhoods before the tornado dissipated.						

=== March 27 event ===
List of confirmed tornadoes – Monday, March 27, 2023
EF#	Location	County / parish	State	Start coord.	Time (UTC)	Path length	Max. width
EF2	WNW of Shorter to Milstead to ENE of Franklin	Macon	AL	32.4103°N 86.008°W	07:41–08:06	15.41 mi (24.80 km)	1,450 yd (1,330 m)
EF2	A large and strong tornado began near Shorter, downing trees and destroying a carport shortly after touching down. The tornado intensified and reached its peak strength as it moved through the small community of Milstead, where a large metal-framed cotton gin warehouse was completely destroyed, and some nearby outbuilding structures were also destroyed. Multiple semi-trucks were flipped onto their sides, the top of a silo was blown off, and many large trees and concrete power poles were snapped in this area. It then damaged buildings at the Auburn University E.V. Smith Research Center, including a farm shed that partially collapsed with its debris scattered across a road. Past Milstead, the tornado weakened and moved eastward through Franklin and surrounding rural areas, downing many trees, overturning a pivot irrigation sprinkler, and inflicting minor damage to a few homes before dissipating.						
EF1	NNE of Durand	Meriwether	GA	32.9637°N 84.7778°W	11:06–11:19	8.7 mi (14.0 km)	150 yd (140 m)
EF1	Hundreds of trees were snapped and uprooted, and several houses were damaged by falling trees, including a mobile home that was largely destroyed. A frame home sustained considerable damage elsewhere along the path, while other homes and an outbuilding sustained more minor roof damage.						
EF0	W of Gordon	Twiggs	GA	32.8794°N 83.4227°W	12:52–12:53	0.32 mi (0.51 km)	50 yd (46 m)
EF0	Trees were snapped and uprooted, and siding was blown off a home.						

=== Rolling Fork–Midnight–Silver City, Mississippi ===
Rolling Fork–Midnight–Silver City, Mississippi
- The tornado southwest of Rolling Fork

Meteorological history
- Formed: March 24, 2023, 7:57 p.m. CDT (UTC−05:00)
- Dissipated: March 24, 2023, 9:08 p.m. CDT (UTC−05:00)
- Duration: 1 hour, 11 minutes

EF4 tornado
- on the Enhanced Fujita scale
- Highest winds: 195 mph (314 km/h)

Overall effects
- Fatalities: 17
- Injuries: 165

This violent, deadly high-end EF4 tornado first touched down in Issaquena County southeast of Mayersville near the Mississippi River. It tracked northeastward over the Steele Bayou Canal and into Sharkey County, producing EF0 to EF1 damage to trees, power poles, and some outbuildings. The tornado then rapidly grew in size and reached EF2 strength as it approached Rolling Fork from the southwest, prompting the issuance of two tornado emergencies. The tornado then became violent and reached EF4 intensity as it entered Rolling Fork, producing catastrophic damage throughout much of the town. Frame homes and duplexes were completely leveled or swept from their foundations, approximately 30 manufactured homes were obliterated, and copious amounts of structural debris was scattered throughout the community. Several structures at an agriculture business, were completely flattened, the local library was completely destroyed, the Rolling Fork Police Department was nearly destroyed, while the fire station, post office, city hall, Rolling Fork Elementary School, South Delta High School were significantly damaged. Multiple older brick buildings in downtown Rolling Fork also had major structural damage, with some well-built businesses and structures completely leveled with only piles of debris remaining. One of the town's water towers was toppled when flying debris compromised its base, leaving a crater where it impacted the ground. Some of the most violent damage occurred in the northeastern part of town, where a flower shop housed in a well-built brick building was completely leveled at high-end EF4 strength, with its concrete foundation slab being partially swept clean of debris. The survey team also noted that the tornado may have reached EF5 intensity here based on the damage to the shop, but the neighboring building was only leveled and not swept away, so there was not enough confidence in upgrading the tornado to EF5. Several nearby homes were also obliterated and large metal-framed buildings, including a Family Dollar store, were completely flattened as well. Many vehicles were also thrown through the air and mangled, and numerous large trees in and around Rolling Fork were denuded and debarked, and a few of them were completely stripped clean of all bark.

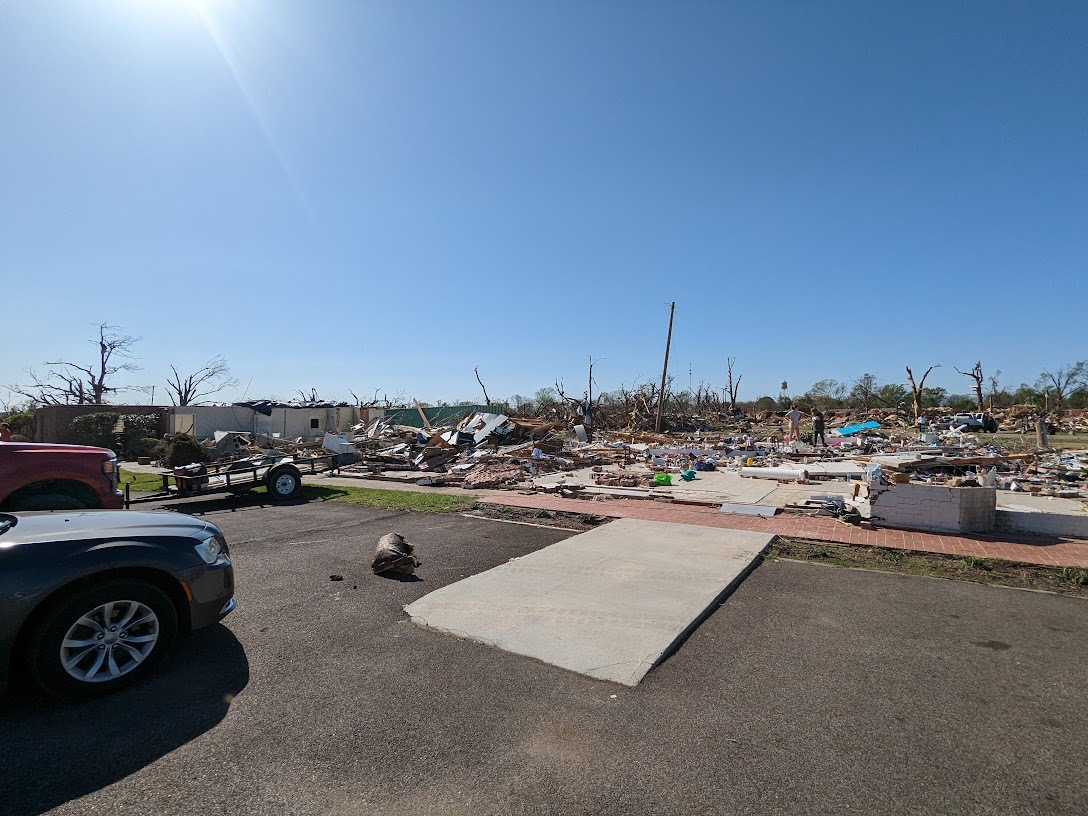
High-end EF4 damage to a flower shop along Walnut Street in Rolling Fork

After exiting Rolling Fork, the tornado remained violent as it moved across several open fields, where severe ground scouring occurred and debris from the town was scattered long distances to the northeast. Several utility poles were snapped off at the base or pulled out of the ground, and some were left covered in up to 1–2 in (2.5–5.1 cm) of mud. A few of the missing power poles were never found. Southeast of Anguilla, the tornado inflicted EF4-strength damage again to hardwood trees, with most completely mangled or debarked. A mobile home was swept away and obliterated with very little debris remaining, and a bus on the property was tossed into trees. Aerial imagery of this area also revealed ground scouring and the presence of cycloidal marks in open fields. Beyond this point, the tornado caused widespread EF2 tree damage in wooded areas. It also destroyed a small frame home and a mobile home before regaining low-end EF3 intensity and mowing down large swaths of trees.

Maintaining low-end EF3 strength, the tornado then crossed into Humphreys County. The tornado briefly strengthened to high-end EF3 strength as it completely leveled a small brick home, and overturned a nearby grain loader. Grain bins were heavily damaged in this area as well, debris was scattered for hundreds of yards into a field, and a grain cart was thrown into the field as well. Passing through the small community of Midnight, the tornado produced EF2 damage as a home, a brick building sustained damage and trees and power poles were snapped. The tornado then moved northeast as it approached Silver City from the southwest. A mobile home was completely destroyed after being thrown 75 ft (23 m) into a nearby field, with only the porch being left behind. A portion of the roof was blown off a school, and two metal buildings were destroyed with large support beams bent and debris scattered across fields. Large areas of hardwood trees were snapped and uprooted.

The tornado then weakened some but continued causing significant damage as it moved into Silver City, where multiple apartment buildings suffered heavy roof damage, including some that had portions of their roofs removed and one that had its walls partially collapsed. Many homes throughout the town had extensive roof damage, some were completely unroofed, and a few sustained collapse of one or more exterior walls. Four manufactured homes were completely destroyed in the center of town, a church sustained roof damage, a large number of old hardwood trees were also snapped or uprooted, and power lines were downed as well. Damage in Silver City was rated EF1 to EF2 in intensity. After passing through Silver City, the tornado weakened and dissipated while causing EF1 to EF0 damage. In total, it traveled 59.4 miles (95.6 km) at an average forward speed of 50.19 mph (80.77 km/h), killing 17 people and injuring 165 others.

=== Black Hawk–Winona, Mississippi ===
Black Hawk–Winona, Mississippi
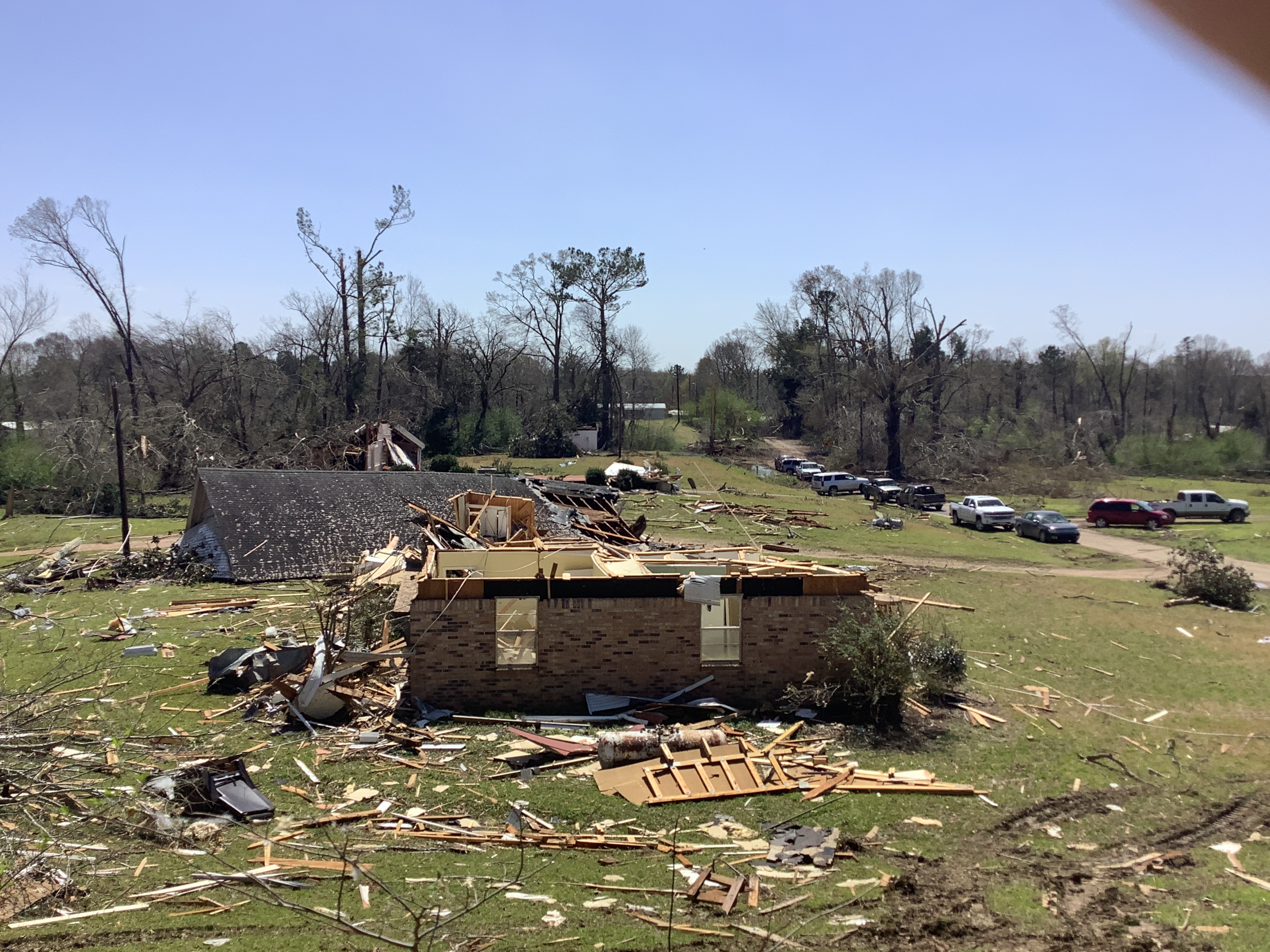
- EF3 damage to a parsonage in Black Hawk.

Meteorological history
- Formed: March 24, 2023, 9:12 p.m. CDT (UTC−05:00)
- Dissipated: March 24, 2023, 9:42 p.m. CDT (UTC−05:00)
- Duration: 30 minutes

EF3 tornado
- on the Enhanced Fujita scale
- Highest winds: 165 mph (266 km/h)

Overall effects
- Fatalities: 3
- Injuries: 5

This intense, long-tracked, and extremely fast-moving tornado quickly formed four minutes after the Rolling Fork EF4 tornado dissipated, first touching down in Carroll County in a wooded area southwest of Black Hawk at 9:12 pm CDT. It quickly intensified to low-end EF2 intensity shortly afterward, snapping or uprooting many trees as it moved to the northeast. After briefly weakening to EF1 intensity, the tornado gained strength and then struck Black Hawk at mid-range EF3 intensity, crossing MS 430, County Road 235, and MS 17. Multiple residences in town sustained major structural damage, including a few homes that had their roofs torn off and exterior walls collapsed, while several other homes had extensive roof damage. The historic Blackhawk School was completely destroyed, and the nearby Black Hawk Independent Church was also destroyed, which had only portions of a few exterior walls left intact. The church's steeple was blown away, with the bell being thrown and not found, and a parsonage on the property was partially destroyed as well. A nearby well-built cinder block masonry building also suffered minor roof and doorway damage. A shed and an equipment trailer were rolled, and many trees were snapped or uprooted. The tornado then exited Black Hawk and continued northeastward through densely forested areas for about 11 miles (18 km), passing southeast of Coila, causing widespread EF1 to EF3 tree damage. A few mobile homes, sheds, and camp houses were damaged or destroyed, including one home that was shifted off its piers and destroyed at mid-range EF3 intensity. Some other structures were damaged in areas that were inaccessible to survey teams due to downed trees. The tornado then caused low-end EF2 damage to another home along Enon Road before producing another swath of EF3-level tree damage as it approached and crossed MS 35. Several mobile homes in this area suffered extensive roof damage or were shifted off their foundations, with at least two mobile homes being destroyed. One of the destroyed mobile homes received a high-end EF2 rating after being ripped off its blocks and thrown 50 yards (46 m) into a nearby wooded area, obliterating it and killing the three occupants inside. An 18-wheeler tractor-trailer was blown over onto its side, and EF2 damage to trees occurred after the tornado crossed MS 35. Another structure northeast of this area was also destroyed, although it was only viewable through satellite imagery. Beyond this point, the tornado again caused EF2 to EF3 tree damage as it approached Montgomery County line. At some point in Carroll County, the tornado reached a peak intensity of high-end EF3, but an exact location for where this occurred was not specified.

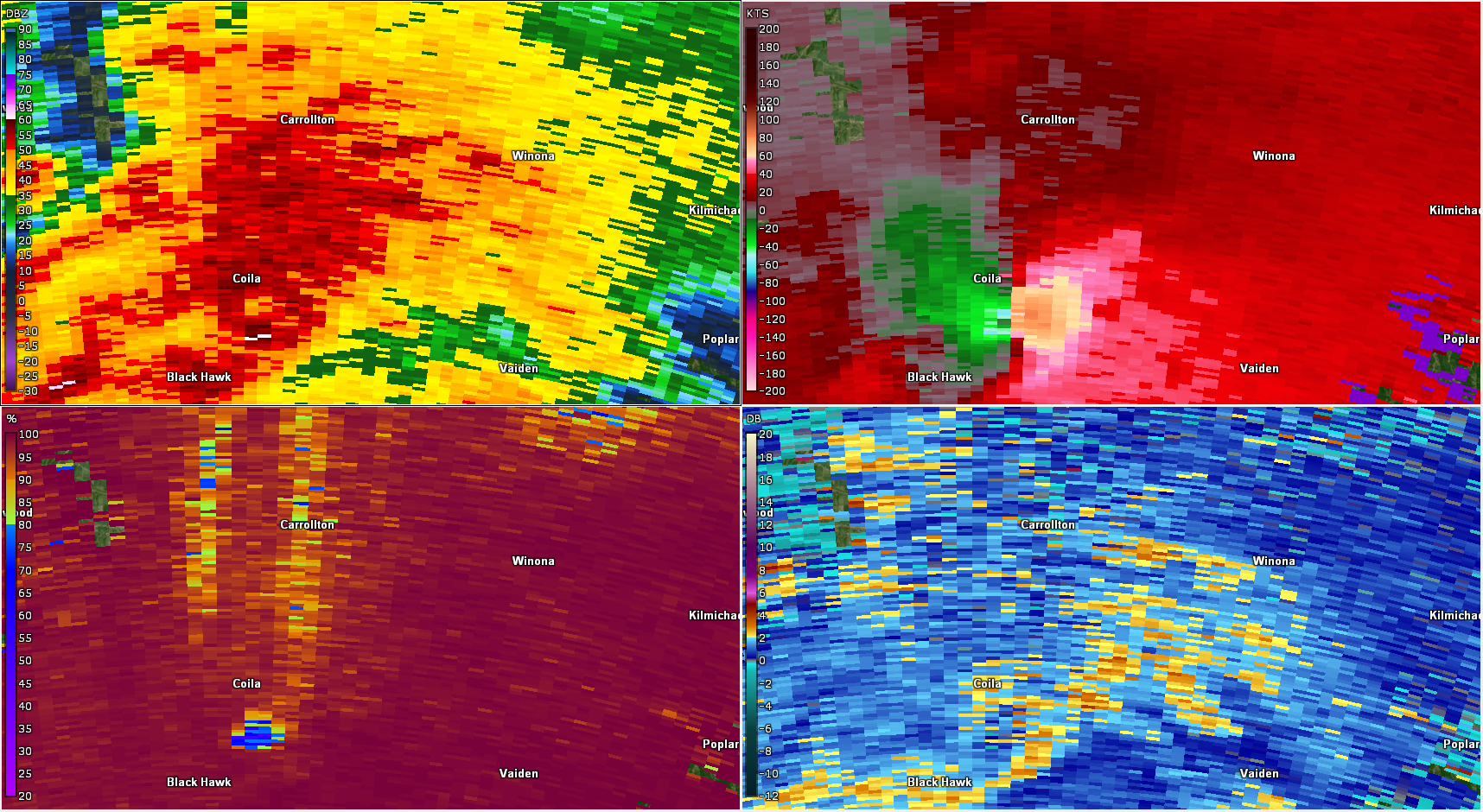
NEXRAD radar scan of the tornado as it approached Winona.

Continuing northeastward, the tornado moved into Montgomery County and crossed I-55, again causing widespread EF2 to EF3 tree damage, although the most intense damage occurred in areas inaccessible to survey teams and could only be seen through satellite imagery. The tornado then briefly weakened to EF1 intensity but reintensified to EF2 strength as it approached Winona, where a tornado emergency was issued. It then impacted the southern outskirts of town and crossed US 51 and Stafford Wells Road at EF2 intensity. Many large trees were snapped or uprooted in this area, and some metal buildings were heavily damaged. The tornado then reached EF3 intensity again along MS 407, where a well-built two-story home had its second floor mostly destroyed, its roof removed, and all of its exterior south-facing walls destroyed. Other homes in the area suffered extensive EF2 roof damage as well. East of the town, the tornado continued to cause EF2 tree damage as it approached US 82. The tornado briefly reached mid-range EF3 intensity just before crossing the highway, destroying a home before knocking down numerous power lines along US 82 at EF2 intensity. The tornado then reached low-end EF3 intensity for the final time as it crossed the intersection of Bethlehem Community Road and Bethlehem Church Road where numerous trees were uprooted and snapped with some denuding and debarking observed in this area. It also inflicted major roof damage to a home, shifted another home off its foundation, and destroyed three outbuildings, one of which had its concrete foundation lifted upward and pivoted 15 to 20 ft (4.6 to 6.1 m) before the structure was destroyed; this damage was rated EF2. The tornado then steadily weakened to EF1 intensity as it continued northeastward, causing considerable tree damage in wooded areas. As it approached Robinson-Thompson Road at a slightly stronger low-end EF2 intensity, the tornado destroyed an outbuilding and inflicted minor to moderate roof and siding damage to a 100-year-old home. It then abruptly weakened and dissipated as it crossed the road well southwest of Lodi.

The tornado traveled for 29.43 miles (47.36 km) at an average forward speed of 58.9 mph (94.7 km/h). Along with the three deaths, five other people were injured. According to the Mississippi Forestry Commission, more than 4,100 acres of forest were damaged or destroyed by this tornado.

=== Egypt–New Wren–Amory–Smithville, Mississippi ===
Egypt–New Wren–Amory–Smithville, Mississippi
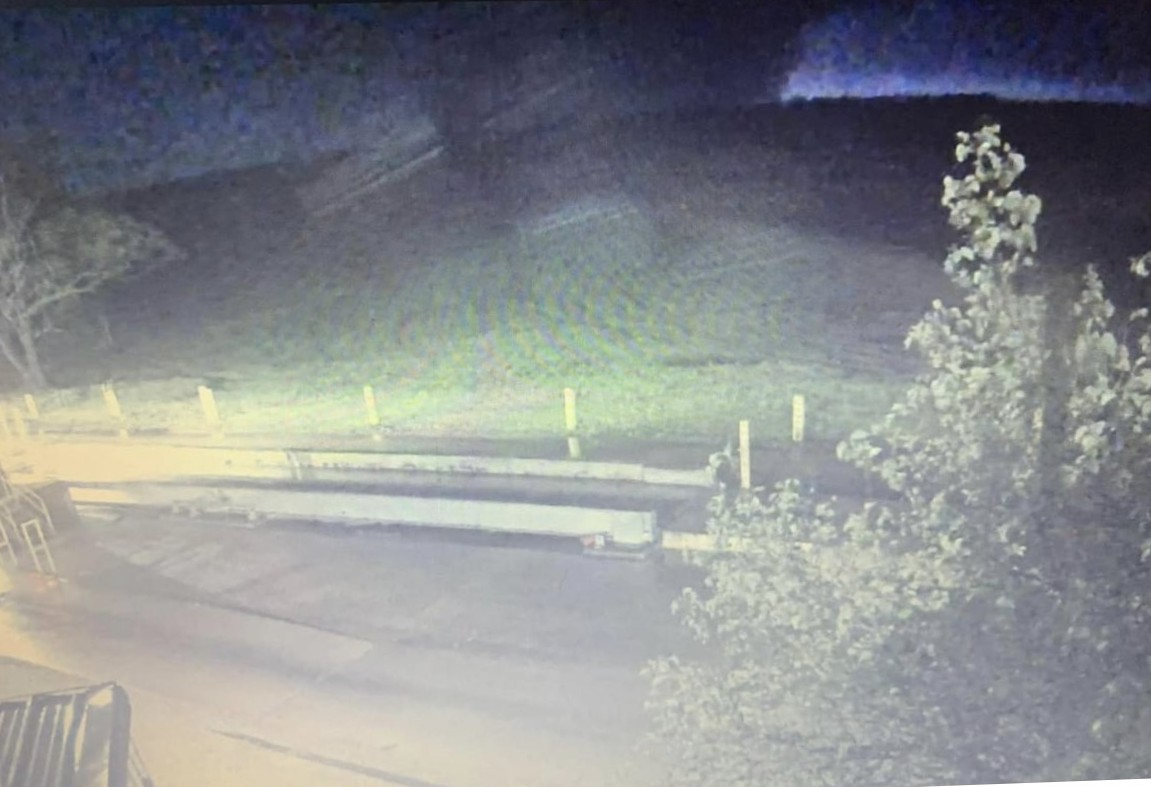
- A CCTV still of the tornado as it crossed US 278.

Meteorological history
- Formed: March 24, 2023, 10:38 p.m. CDT (UTC−05:00)
- Dissipated: March 24, 2023, 11:09 p.m. CDT (UTC−05:00)
- Duration: 31 minutes

EF3 tornado
- on the Enhanced Fujita scale
- Highest winds: 155 mph (249 km/h)

Overall effects
- Fatalities: 2
- Injuries: 55
- Damage: $80.045 million

This intense, long-tracked, and extremely fast-moving EF3 tornado, which came from the same storm that produced the Rolling Fork EF4 and Black Hawk EF3 tornadoes, caused major damage in or near the communities of Egypt, New Wren, and Amory in Mississippi. The tornado first touched down southwest of Egypt in far eastern Chickasaw County. As the tornado travelled northeast across County Road 179 and US 45 Alternate, it produced EF0 to EF1 damage, snapping and uprooting numerous trees and overturning a metal carport. The tornado entered Monroe County and intensified to EF2 strength as it passed east of Egypt, destroying several single-wide mobile homes. Numerous utility poles and trees were snapped, cars were overturned, and a few other homes also suffered roof damage as well. Several injuries occurred in this area. The tornado remained at EF2 strength while continuing northeast of Egypt, snapping numerous additional trees and power poles, destroying an outbuilding, and inflicting roof damage to several homes. The tornado then began to intensify further, attaining high-end EF2 intensity as it reached McAllister Road and Herndon Lane, where several homes suffered significant damage, including a few that had roofs ripped off and some exterior walls collapsed. Multiple single and double-wide manufactured homes in this area were obliterated, with two people inside one of them being killed, and several people suffered significant injuries as well. In addition, many hardwood trees were snapped or uprooted in this area. As the tornado continued toward US 45 at high-end EF2 strength, it reached its peak width of 1,600 yards (1,500 m) and caused widespread damage to trees and homes along the west side of Whatley Road, including a mobile home that was destroyed and a frame home that was shifted off its foundation. Around this time, a tornado emergency was issued for New Wren and Amory.

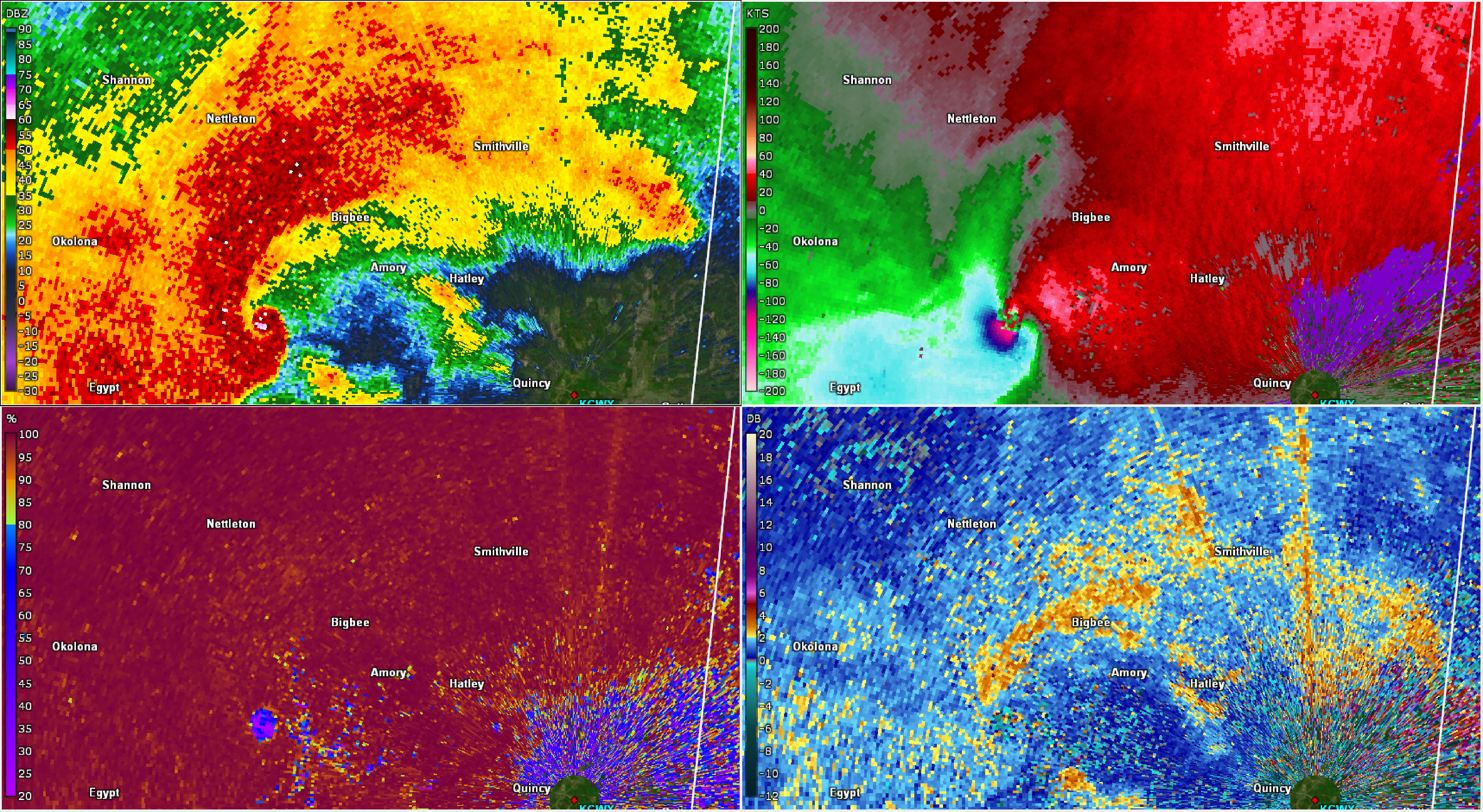
NEXRAD radar scan of the tornado as it approached Amory.

As the tornado crossed US 45 at the intersection with Whatley Road and passed just south of New Wren, it reached low-end EF3 intensity, inflicting significant damage to numerous structures. One manufactured home was completely destroyed with debris thrown 200 yards (180 m) away, a nearby church was demolished, and some other homes sustained significant damage. In addition, power poles were snapped, some barns were heavily damaged, and residences along the outer edge of the damage path had more minor damage. Just beyond this point along Little Coontail Road, low-end EF3 damage continued as a house had its roof torn off and exterior walls collapsed, another home was largely leveled, and multiple manufactured homes were obliterated. A boat was tossed over 50 yards (46 m) and an SUV was thrown into a tree as well. The tornado then weakened slightly but remained strong, continuing northeastward at EF2 intensity and approaching the city of Amory. Severe tree damage continued to occur along this segment of the path, and some homes also sustained mainly minor roof damage as well.

The tornado then crossed over US 278 near where it intersected the Tennessee Tombigbee Waterway and entered Amory, intensifying to its peak intensity of mid-range EF3 as it crossed over the BNSF Railway Amory Subdivision line and MS 25. WTVA chief meteorologist Matt Laubhan prayed for the city in the name of Jesus live on TV as the debris signature moved into town. Widespread significant damage was inflicted to homes, businesses, and trees throughout Amory, especially in the northern part of town. An Exxon gas station, Jack's restaurant, multiple churches, and a Piggly Wiggly grocery store all suffered major structural damage or were destroyed, along with other commercial buildings and businesses in town. Homes had roofs and exterior walls torn off, mobile homes were completely destroyed, apartment buildings were partially unroofed, a cell tower was blown over, and many trees and power poles were snapped. Some self-storage garages and metal industrial buildings were damaged or destroyed as well, and Amory High School had significant damage to its athletic fields. In all, about 115 businesses in Amory were damaged or destroyed. The tornado then weakened slightly but remained strong as it continued northeastward at EF2 strength, causing severe damage to a few homes and a National Guard armory near the Amory Golf Course as it exited town. Continuing to the northeast at EF2 strength, the tornado impacted trees, a few homes, and some other structures as it moved though rural areas. Near Parham Store Road, a trailer was thrown 250 yards (230 m) into a field, and a few homes sustained significant roof damage. Just beyond this point, the tornado weakened to EF1 intensity as it passed to the southeast of Smithville, inflicting roof damage to a couple of homes, damaging some outbuildings, and downing trees. The tornado continued to weaken and narrow as it approached and entered Itawamba County, causing only intermittent EF0 to EF1 tree damage before dissipating as it approached Wilson Road just west of the Alabama state line.

In total, two people were killed and 55 others were injured; all the casualties occurred in Monroe County. The tornado traveled 36.91 miles (59.40 km) at an average forward speed of 71.4 mph (114.9 km/h). According to the Mississippi Forestry Commission, 975 acres of forest were damaged or destroyed by the tornado.

=== North West Point–Smiths Mill–Pine Mountain, Georgia ===
North West Point–Smiths Mill–Pine Mountain, Georgia
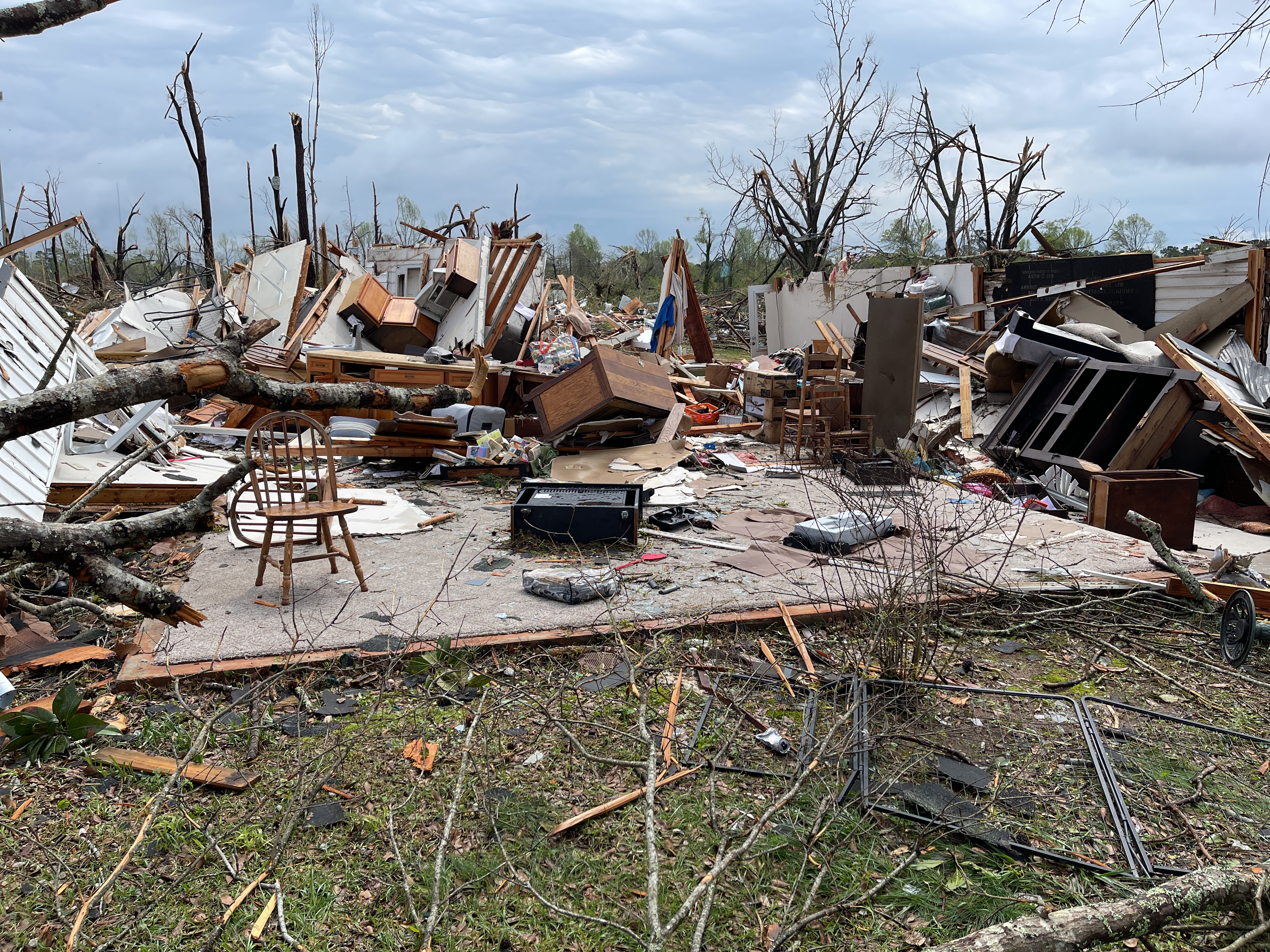
- A poorly anchored home that was leveled at EF3 intensity in North West Point

Meteorological history
- Formed: March 26, 2023, 6:49 a.m. EDT (UTC−04:00)
- Dissipated: March 26, 2023, 7:19 a.m. EDT (UTC−04:00)
- Duration: 30 minutes

EF3 tornado
- on the Enhanced Fujita scale
- Highest winds: 150 mph (240 km/h) (Note: Both reports summarize the entire track, not individual county statistics.)

Overall effects
- Fatalities: 0
- Injuries: 5

This intense tornado touched down just east of the Alabama-Georgia border in Troup County northwest of West Point, Georgia and moved eastward, damaging trees at EF0 strength. After crossing the Chattahoochee River, the tornado rapidly intensified, producing major damage as it moved into the community of North West Point, and quickly reaching its peak intensity as it crossed US 29/SR 14. Four homes in this area were completely leveled, although they were anchored with nails rather than bolts, earning only a mid-range EF3 rating. Other homes in the area also sustained major structural damage, some of which had their roofs torn off or were left with only interior walls standing, and a manufactured home was completely destroyed. Numerous large trees in North West Point were uprooted, snapped, or sustained partial debarking, Bethel Baptist Church was partially destroyed, a small motel and several vehicles were heavily damaged, and debris was scattered throughout the area. Still continuing eastward, the tornado exited North West Point and crossed over a CSX railway line into forested areas, snapping or uprooting a large swath of trees. After crossing Kia Parkway and I-85, the tornado weakened to EF1 strength as it moved along Lower Lovelace Road and crossed Johns Road, with damage in this area consisting of trees that were snapped or uprooted, and damage to an outbuilding. The tornado began to strengthen again as it crossed nearby Billings Road, causing up to EF2 damage as a home suffered major roof damage, and a masonry building sustained total destruction of its second floor. A manufactured home in this area also had its roof heavily damaged and was shifted off its foundation. The tornado strengthened further as it crossed Shoemaker Road, where three homes were largely destroyed with all of their exterior walls knocked down. One of the homes received a low-end EF3 rating while the other two were rated high-end EF2. The tornado then weakened and crossed Adams Road and Jarrell Hogg Road at EF1 intensity. Along this portion of the path, several homes and outbuildings were damaged, and many trees were snapped or uprooted.

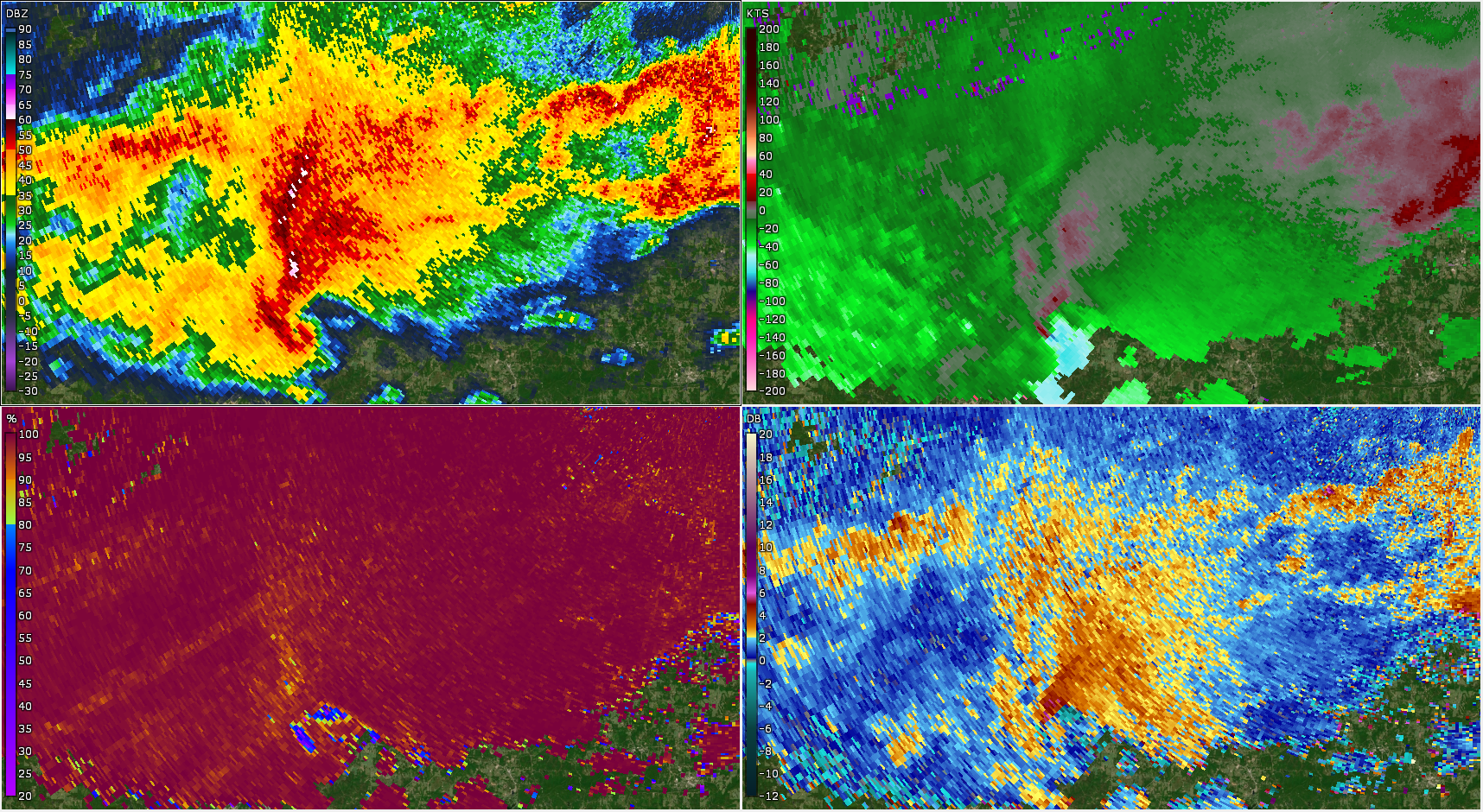
NEXRAD radar scan of the EF3 tornado near West Point.

Still continuing eastward, the tornado reached EF2 intensity again as it crossed Whitesville Road near its intersection of Ely Callaway Road. A house was completely unroofed, another house had extensive roof damage, and a more concentrated area of snapped and uprooted trees was noted. To the east, the tornado weakened back to EF1 strength as it passed south of the Smiths Mill community and moved across I-185. Damage along this segment of the path consisted almost entirely of downed trees, though there was minor damage to a few homes and outbuildings. Briefly strengthening back to EF2 intensity, the tornado snapped large tree trunks as it crossed Oak Grove Road, and also caused EF1 damage to two residences. It also caused damage at the Pine Mountain Wild Animal Safari in this area, where several animal enclosures were breached. Two tigers briefly escaped from one of the enclosures, but they were quickly found, tranquilized, and safely returned. Additional trees were snapped or uprooted an EF1 intensity as it crossed over US 27 and Old Chipley Road. As the tornado neared the Meriwether County line, it produced one last area of EF2 damage at the Cherokee Resort Club, where more than 40 cabins sustained damage, and several were destroyed. After moving into Meriwether County, the tornado began a rapid weakening trend, causing only EF0 tree damage. The last area of damage that was found was at Robert Williams Road northeast of Pine Mountain, where a couple of trees were snapped. The tornado dissipated at this point just before crossing SR 18 west-southwest of Durand.

In all, 146 homes were impacted by this tornado in Troup County; 23 of them were destroyed, 26 sustained major damage and 41 sustained minor damage. Additionally, several businesses were also heavily damaged or destroyed. The tornado remained on the ground for 21.7 mi (34.9 km) at an average forward speed of 43.4 mph (69.84 km/h), injuring five people.

== Non-tornadic effects ==
As widespread heavy rainfall associated with the eastward-moving storm system developed, flash flood watches were hoisted for more than 18 million people across 10 states. In Missouri, rainfall accumulations in excess of 3 in (76 mm) forced the closure of local highways. Two people in a vehicle were killed near Grovespring when they attempted to cross a bridge over a flooded creek. Meanwhile, another woman in southwestern Missouri went missing when a small river washed her car off the road. To the south and east, severe storms across Mississippi and Tennessee caused more than 55,000 power outages. Further north, Madison, Wisconsin, set a one-day record for March snowfall, at 12.1 in (31 cm). The winter storm resulted in many downed power lines on I-39, shutting down a portion of the highway.

== Aftermath ==
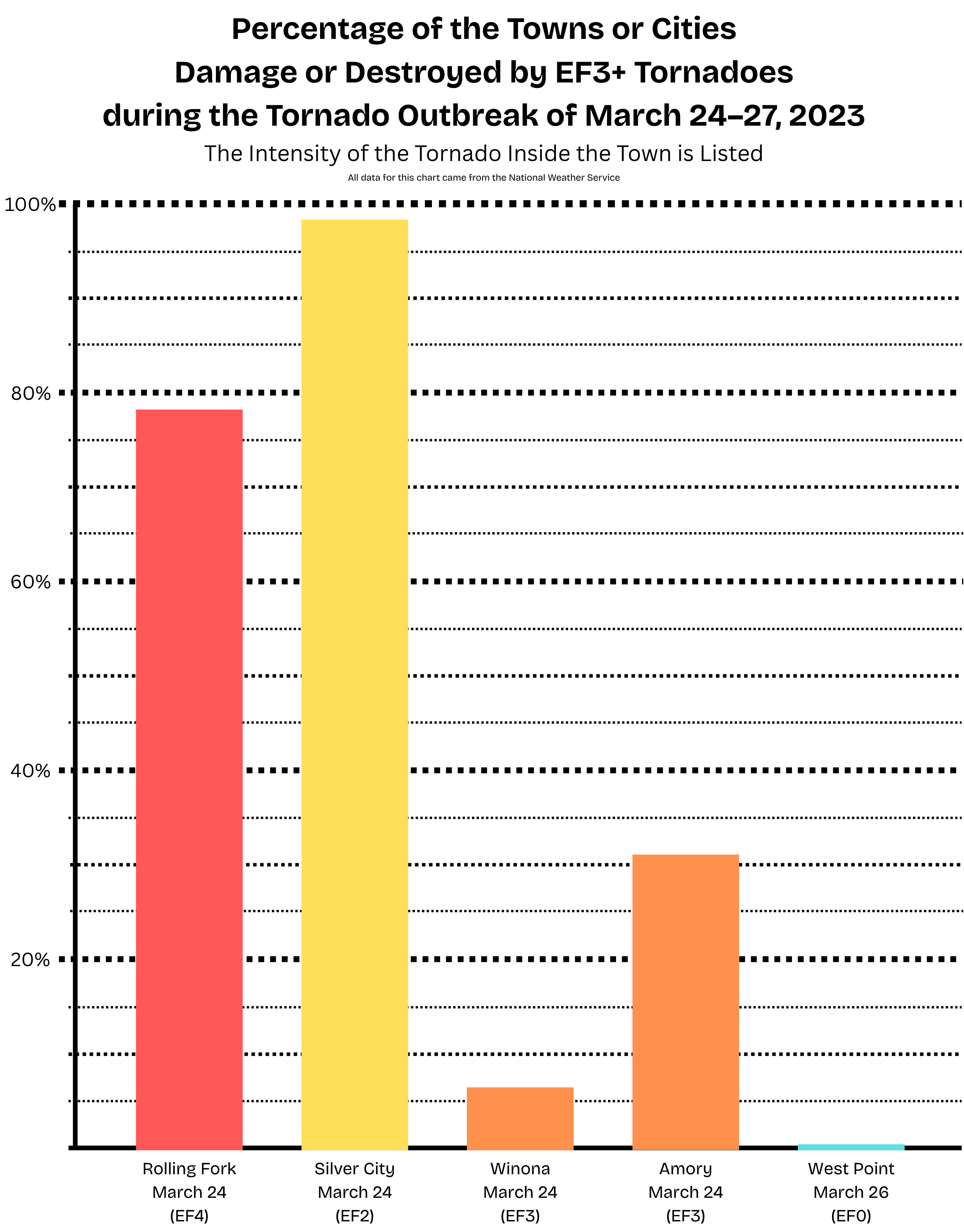
A chart showing the EF3+ tornadoes during the outbreak and percentages of towns they damaged or destroyed

=== Political response ===
Both state and national politicians responded to the devastation in Mississippi. On March 25, Governor of Mississippi Tate Reeves declared a state of emergency in Sharkey, Humphreys, Carroll, and Monroe counties. Governor Reeves's request for a major disaster declaration was granted by President Joe Biden on March 26. President Biden visited Rolling Fork on March 31 and announced that the federal government would fully cover cost of the cleanup. The Mississippi state legislature also later approved approximately $18.5 million in relief funds.

=== Mississippi ===
==== Rolling Fork ====
Rolling Fork's funeral director and mayor, Eldridge Walker, said on March 27 that search-and-rescue efforts were "pretty close" to finished and authorities believe everyone has been accounted for. Following major damage to the Sharkey Issaquena Community Hospital and the Delta Health Center, both based in Rolling Fork, the University of Mississippi Medical Center partnered with state agencies to establish a temporary field hospital at the town's National Guard Armory. The Mississippi Emergency Management Agency (MEMA) contracted with the Red Cross to provide survivors with meals and lodging in hotel rooms for up to six months. By April 11, Mayor Walker said that 500 people, approximately a third of the town's population, remained displaced. To dispose of debris and waste from the tornado's damage, Sharkey County established a burn site on the town's outskirts. On April 10 alone, 260 truckloads of debris made the trip to the burn site. Influencer and YouTuber Ryan Hall, Y'all raised $120,000 through social media to give generators out after the storm.

==== Amory ====
A curfew between 8:00 p.m. and 6:00 a.m. was instituted in Amory, as well as a notice to boil water, following the city's water department taking a hit from the Rolling Fork storm's third tornado. The school district there resumed normal classes on April 11, with 85% attendance.

Due to the severe damage inflicted to its athletic facilities, Amory High School's baseball team was forced to play the remainder of its season on the road. Despite this, the team went on to win a state championship for the 2023 season.

== See also ==
- Weather of 2024
- List of North American tornadoes and tornado outbreaks
- List of F4 and EF4 tornadoes
  - List of F4 and EF4 tornadoes (2020–present)
- Tornadoes of 2024
- List of United States tornadoes in March 2023
