= 1935 Mississippi lieutenant gubernatorial election =

1935 Mississippi Democratic lieutenant gubernatorial primary runoff
- August 27, 1935
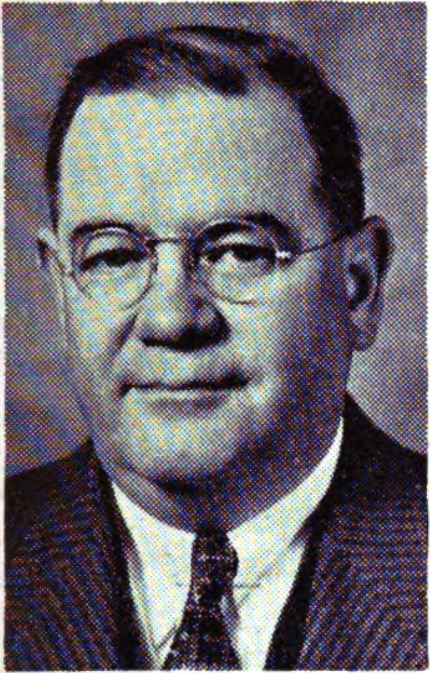

Candidate	J. B. Snider	Walter N. Taylor
Party	Democratic	Democratic
Popular vote	175,828	163,449
Percentage	51.82%	48.18%
- County results Snider: 50–60% 60–70% 70–80% 80–90% Taylor: 50–60% 60–70%
Lieutenant governor before election
Dennis Murphree
Democratic
Elected Lieutenant governor
Jacob Snider
Democratic

The 1935 Mississippi lieutenant gubernatorial election took place on November 5, 1935, in order to elect the Lieutenant Governor of Mississippi. Incumbent Democrat Dennis Murphree decided to run for governor instead of seeking another term.

As was common at the time, the Democratic candidate ran unopposed in the general election; therefore, the Democratic primary was the real contest, and winning the primary was considered tantamount to election.

== Democratic primary ==
No candidate received a majority in the Democratic primary, which featured three contenders, so a runoff was held between the top two candidates. The runoff election was won by State Representative J. B. Snider, who defeated State Senator Walter N. Taylor.

=== Results ===
August 6, 1935 Democratic primary
Party	Candidate	Votes	%
Democratic	J. B. Snider	115,083	34.55%
Democratic	Walter N. Taylor	111,186	33.38%
Democratic	W. W. Ramsey	106,795	32.07%
Total votes		333,064	100.00%

=== Runoff ===
August 27, 1935 Democratic primary runoff
Party	Candidate	Votes	%
Democratic	J. B. Snider	175,828	51.82%
Democratic	Walter N. Taylor	163,449	48.18%
Total votes		339,277	100.00%

== General election ==
In the general election, Snider won unopposed.

=== Results ===
November 5, 1935 General Election
Party	Candidate	Votes	%
Democratic	J. B. Snider	45,276	100.00%
Total votes		45,276	100.00%
