= Wilson S. Hill =

American politician

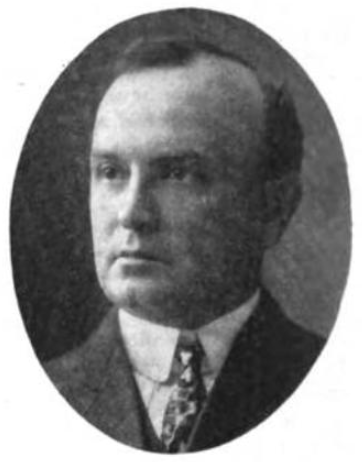

Member of the U.S. House of Representatives from Mississippi's 4th district
- In office March 4, 1903 – March 3, 1909
- Preceded by: Andrew F. Fox
- Succeeded by: Thomas U. Sisson

Member of the Mississippi House of Representatives
- In office 1884–1888

Personal details
- Born: Wilson Shedric Hill; January 19, 1863 Lodi, Montgomery County, Mississippi
- Died: February 14, 1921 (aged 58) Greenwood, Mississippi
- Resting place: Oakwood Cemetery, Winona, Mississippi
- Party: Democratic
- Education: University of Mississippi at Oxford; Cumberland School of Law
- Occupation: Lawyer, politician

Wilson Shedric Hill (January 19, 1863 – February 14, 1921) was an American lawyer and politician who served three terms as a U.S. representative from Mississippi from 1903 to 1909.

== Biography ==
Born near Lodi, Choctaw County (now Montgomery County), Mississippi. Hill attended the common schools and the University of Mississippi at Oxford. He was graduated from Cumberland School of Law at Cumberland University, Lebanon, Tennessee, in 1884.

=== Early career ===
He was admitted to the bar in 1884 and commenced practice in Winona, Mississippi. He served as a member of the State House of Representatives in 1885. He served as district attorney for the fifth judicial district of Mississippi 1891–1903. He served as a member of the city council of Winona 1892–1894.

=== Congress ===
Hill was elected as a Democrat to the Fifty-eighth, Fifty-ninth, and Sixtieth Congresses (March 4, 1903 – March 3, 1909). He was an unsuccessful candidate for renomination in 1908.

=== Later career and death ===
He resumed the practice of law in Greenwood, Mississippi and served as delegate to the Democratic National Convention in 1912.

He served as district attorney for the northern judicial district from 1914 to 1921.

He died in Greenwood, Mississippi, February 14, 1921. He was interred in Oakwood Cemetery, Winona, Mississippi.

U.S. House of Representatives
Preceded by Andrew F. Fox	Member of the U.S. House of Representatives from Mississippi's 4th congressional district 1903–1909	Succeeded by Thomas U. Sisson
