= Sid Robinson =

Sid Robinson may refer to:

- Stanley L. Robinson (1890–1967), American football player and coach, also known as Sid
- Sid Robinson (athlete) (1902–1982), American middle-distance runner
