= Andrew F. Fox =

American politician (1849–1926)

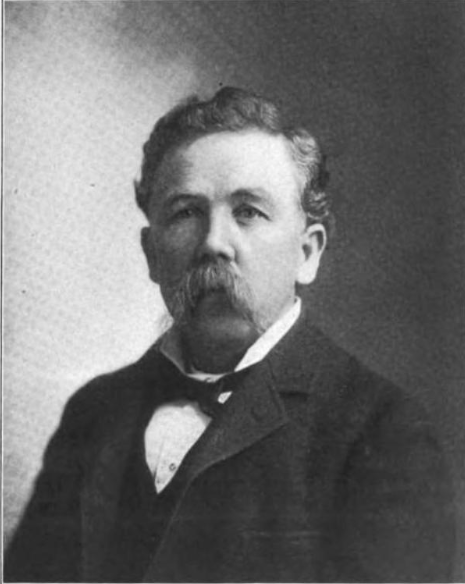

Member of the U.S. House of Representatives from Mississippi's 4th district
- In office March 4, 1897 – March 3, 1903
- Preceded by: Hernando D. Money
- Succeeded by: Wilson S. Hill

Member of the Mississippi State Senate
- In office 1891–1893

Personal details
- Born: Andrew Fuller Fox; April 26, 1849 Reform, Alabama, U.S.
- Died: August 29, 1926 (aged 77) West Point, Mississippi, U.S.
- Resting place: Greenwood Cemetery, West Point, Mississippi, U.S.
- Party: Democratic
- Profession: Politician, lawyer

Andrew Fuller Fox (April 26, 1849 – August 29, 1926) was an American lawyer and politician who served three terms as a U.S. representative from Mississippi from 1897 to 1903.

== Biography ==
Born in Reform, Alabama, the son of Hally Fox and Sarah Hughes, Fox moved to Calhoun County, Mississippi, with his parents in 1853. He attended private schools, and was graduated from Mansfield (Texas) College in 1872. He studied law in Grenada, Mississippi. He was admitted to the bar in 1877 and commenced practice in Calhoun and Webster Counties. He moved to West Point, Mississippi, in 1883, upon invitation from Frank White. After White moved to Birmingham, Fox formed a law partnership with S. M. Roane.

=== Political career ===
He served as delegate to the Democratic National Convention in 1888. He served as member of the State senate from 1891 until 1893, when he resigned to accept the office of United States Attorney for the Northern District of Mississippi. He resigned the latter office on September 1, 1896.

==== Congress ====
Fox was elected as a Democrat to the Fifty-fifth, Fifty-sixth, and Fifty-seventh Congresses (March 4, 1897 – March 3, 1903). He was not a candidate for renomination in 1902.

=== Later career ===
He served as president of Mississippi State Bar Association in 1911. He engaged in the practice of law in West Point, Mississippi, until 1914, when he retired.

=== Death and burial ===
He died in West Point, Mississippi, August 29, 1926. He was interred at Greenwood Cemetery in West Point, Mississippi.

U.S. House of Representatives
Preceded by Hernando D. Money	Member of the U.S. House of Representatives from Mississippi's 4th congressional district 1897–1903	Succeeded by Wilson S. Hill
