= Pearl Conklin =

American composer

- Born: April 25, 1879; Winona, Mississippi, United States
- Died: April 13, 1961 (aged 81); Los Angeles, California, United States
- Occupation: Composer

Pearl Conklin (April 25, 1879 – April 13, 1961) was an American composer. Her work was part of the music event in the art competition at the 1932 Summer Olympics.
