= Thomas U. Sisson =

American politician (1869–1923)

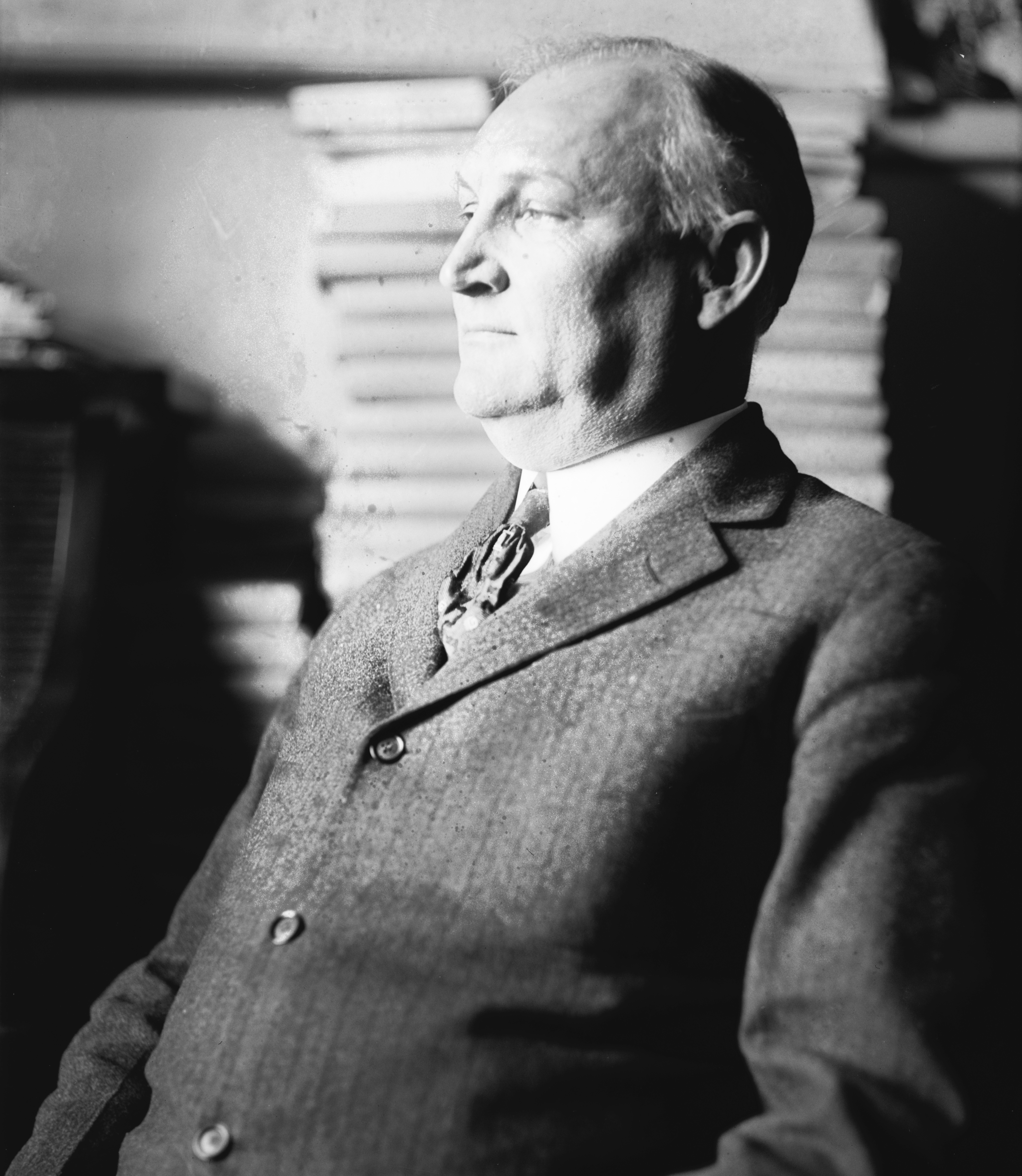
- Sisson, 1922–1923

Member of the U.S. House of Representatives from Mississippi's 4th district
- In office March 4, 1909 – January 3, 1923
- Preceded by: Wilson S. Hill
- Succeeded by: T. Jeff Busby

Personal details
- Born: Thomas Upton Sisson; September 22, 1869 Attala County, Mississippi, US
- Died: September 26, 1923 (aged 54) Washington, D.C., US
- Resting place: Oakwood Cemetery, Winona, Mississippi
- Party: Democratic
- Education: French Camp Academy; Southwestern Presbyterian University; University of Mississippi; Cumberland School of Law
- Occupation: Educator, lawyer, politician

Thomas Upton Sisson (September 22, 1869 – September 26, 1923) was an American lawyer and politician who served seven terms as a U.S. representative from Mississippi from 1909 to 1923.

== Biography ==
=== Early life ===
Sisson was born on September 22, 1869, near McCool, Attala County, Mississippi. He moved with his father to Choctaw County, Mississippi. He attended the common schools and the French Camp Academy, Mississippi. He graduated from the Southwestern Presbyterian University, now known as Rhodes College, in Clarksville, Tennessee, in 1889. He then studied law at the University of Mississippi in Oxford, Mississippi, and was graduated from Cumberland School of Law at Cumberland University in Lebanon, Tennessee.

=== Career ===
He served as the principal of Carthage High School in Carthage, Mississippi, from 1889 to 1890. He then served as principal of the graded schools in Kosciusko, Mississippi, from 1890 to 1892.

He was admitted to the bar in Memphis, Tennessee, in 1894 and began practicing the Law in Winona, Mississippi. He served as a member of the Mississippi State Senate in 1898. He then served as district attorney of the fifth judicial district from 1903 to 1907.

=== Congress ===
He served as a Democratic member of the United States House of Representatives from March 4, 1909, to March 3, 1923. He was an unsuccessful candidate for reelection in 1922 to the sixty-eighth Congress.

=== Death ===
He died on September 26, 1923, in Washington, D.C. He was buried at the Oakwood Cemetery in Winona, Mississippi.

U.S. House of Representatives
Preceded by Wilson S. Hill	Member of the U.S. House of Representatives from Mississippi's 4th congressional district 1909–1923	Succeeded by T. Jeff Busby
