= Henry Milton =

American baseball player

- Outfielder
- Born: June 2, 1912; Winona, Mississippi, U.S.
- Died: June 25, 1943 (aged 31); Crown Point, Indiana, U.S.
- Batted: Left Threw: Right

Negro league baseball debut
- 1932, for the Indianapolis ABCs

Last appearance
- 1940, for the Kansas City Monarchs

Teams
- Indianapolis ABCs (1932); Kansas City Monarchs (1935–1940)

Henry William Milton (June 2, 1912 – June 25, 1943), nicknamed "Streak", was an American Negro league outfielder from 1932 to 1940.

A native of Winona, Mississippi, Milton attended Washington High School in East Chicago, Indiana, and Wiley College, where he played college football. He made his Negro leagues debut in 1932 with the Indianapolis ABCs, and went on to play six seasons with the Kansas City Monarchs. Milton was selected to play in the East–West All-Star Game in five consecutive seasons from 1936 to 1940. He died of spinal meningitis in Crown Point, Indiana in 1943 at age 31.
