= John Peroutt Taylor =

American politician (1855–1930)

32nd State Treasurer of Mississippi
- In office January 17, 1916 – January 19, 1920

Member of the Mississippi Senate from the 26th district
- In office January 1912 – January 17, 1916
- Succeeded by: Lewis S. Hemphill

Member of the Mississippi House of Representatives from the Montgomery County district
- In office 1892–1906

Personal details
- Born: 1855 Carroll County, Mississippi, U.S.
- Died: September 5, 1930 (aged 74–75) Winona, Mississippi, U.S.
- Party: Democratic

John Peroutt Taylor (1855 – September 5, 1930), also known as John Pervatt Taylor, was a Democratic Mississippi politician and legislator who was the state treasurer of Mississippi from 1916 to 1920.

== Biography ==
John Peroutt Taylor was born in the year 1855, in Carroll County, Mississippi. He was the son of Benjamin B. and Elizabeth Frances Taylor. He graduated from Vanderbilt University with a medical degree in 1881 and started practicing medicine. He was also a farmer. He was elected to represent Montgomery County as a Democrat in the Mississippi House of Representatives in November 1891. He served there from 1892 to 1906. He was elected to the Mississippi State Senate in 1911, representing the 26th District, which composed of Carroll and Montgomery Counties. In 1915, he was elected the state treasurer of Mississippi. He served in this position from January 17, 1916 to January 19, 1920. He died on September 5, 1930, in Winona, Mississippi.

== Personal life ==
Taylor was a devout Baptist. He never married. His cousin, Walter Nesbit Taylor, was also a Mississippi state senator.
