= WONA-FM =

Radio station in Winona, Mississippi

- Winona, Mississippi; United States
- Frequency: 95.1 MHz
- Branding: "95.1 The Farm"

Programming
- Format: Country

Ownership
- Owner: Sharon P. Kent and Susan P. Benning; (Southern Electronics Co., Inc.)

History
- Former call signs: WZMS (2015–2018)

Technical information
- Licensing authority: FCC
- Facility ID: 189500
- Class: C3
- ERP: 9,200 watts
- HAAT: 157 metres (515 ft)
- Transmitter coordinates: 33°34′56″N 89°44′52″W

Links
- Public license information: Public file; LMS
- Webcast: Listen Live
- Website: www.951thefarm.com

WONA-FM (95.1 FM) is a radio station licensed to serve the community of Winona, Mississippi. The station is owned by Sharon Kent and Susan Benning, through licensee Southern Electronics Co., Inc., and airs a country music format.

The station was assigned the call sign WZMS by the Federal Communications Commission on September 17, 2015. The station changed its call sign to WONA-FM on September 27, 2018.
