= Lodi, Montgomery County, Mississippi =

Lodi, Mississippi
- Unincorporated community
- Location within Mississippi Location within the United States
- Coordinates: 33°33′01″N 89°31′15″W
- Country: United States
- State: Mississippi
- County: Montgomery
- Elevation: 469 ft (143 m)
- Time zone: UTC-6 (Central (CST))
  - Summer (DST): UTC-5 (CDT)
- Area code: 662
- GNIS feature ID: 672762

Lodi is an unincorporated community in Montgomery County, Mississippi, United States. Lodi was once incorporated and in 1900 had a population of 29. A post office operated under the name Lodi from 1849 to 1969.

== Notable people ==
- Wilson S. Hill, a U.S. Representative from Mississippi, was born near Lodi in 1863.
- Sid Robinson, athlete at the 1928 Summer Olympics
- Walter Nesbit Taylor, member of the Mississippi Senate from 1924 to 1936
