= Sid Robinson (athlete) =

American middle-distance runner

Personal information
- Nationality: American
- Born: December 6, 1902 Winona, Mississippi, U.S.
- Died: January 8, 1982 (aged 79) Bloomington, Indiana, U.S.

Sport
- Sport: Middle-distance running
- Event: 1500 metres

Sidney Robinson Jr. (December 6, 1902 – January 9, 1982) was an American physiologist who had been a middle-distance runner. He competed in the men's 1500 metres at the 1928 Summer Olympics. He earned a PhD from Harvard University in 1938 and was a professor emeritus of physiology at Indiana University. His research in the effects of thermal stress on the human body led to the development of better clothes for the United States military.

Sidney Robinson was born near Lodi, Montgomery County, Mississippi on December 6, 1902, to parents Sidney I. Robinson and Emma Townsend Robinson. He attended primary school in nearby Winona, Mississippi, before attending high school in Arkansas. Robinson graduated from Mississippi A&M College, now known as Mississippi State University, with a bachelor's degree in science in 1924. While there, Robinson was a member of A&M's track team, coached by Earl C. Hayes. Robinson then attended Cornell University, where he earned a Master of Science degree in 1930. Robinson moved to Indiana University Bloomington the same year of his graduation at Cornell to serve as an assistant professor of physical and health education as well as assistant track coach under Hayes. At Indiana, Robinson's cross-country teams won five straight Big Ten Conference championships and three national Amateur Athletic Union championships.

Robinson returned to school and graduated with a PhD from Harvard University in 1938. Robinson then returned to Indiana, where he became an associate professor of physiology in 1940 and a full professor in 1946. Robinson served as the university's chairman of the departments of anatomy and physiology from 1958 until 1964. In 1967, Robinson won the Honor Award from the American College of Sports Medicine. His citation read:

A renowned athlete, skilled track coach, preeminent physiologist and experienced administrator, whose environmental laboratory at Indiana is a tribute to his genius. This award is given for his notable contributions to the physiology of exercise, of aging, of thermal stress and war time studies which led to improved clothing and equipment for the armed forces.

— American College of Sports Medicine (1967)

Robinson died on January 8, 1982, in Bloomington, Indiana. He was 79.
