= Walter Nesbit Taylor =

American educator and politician (1874–1956)

Member of the Mississippi Senate from the 12th district
- In office January 1924 – January 1936
- Preceded by: Elwood Kirby Middleton (Hinds)

Personal details
- Born: January 23, 1874 Lodi, Montgomery County, Mississippi, US
- Died: November 27, 1956 (aged 82) Jackson, Mississippi, US
- Party: Democrat
- Relations: John Peroutt Taylor (cousin)
- Children: 3

Walter Nesbit Taylor (January 23, 1874 – November 27, 1956) was an American educator and politician. He served as a Mississippi state senator, representing the state's 12th district as a Democrat, from 1924 to 1936.

== Biography ==
Taylor was born on January 23, 1874, in Lodi, Montgomery County, Mississippi. He was the son of William Prevatte Taylor, and Wilmoth Ann "Annie" (Hurt) Taylor. He received a B. S. degree from Mississippi College in 1897. He also received his M. A. from there in 1898. He then served as the principal of their preparatory department from 1899 to 1903. He was a high school principal in Florence, Mississippi, from 1905 to 1909. From 1910 to 1915, he was the superintendent of the Montgomery County agricultural high schools, and from 1915 to 1921, he was the superintendent of the Hinds County agricultural high schools. In 1921, he became the executive secretary of the Mississippi Education Association. He was a member of the Mississippi State Senate, one of the three senators representing Hinds and Warren counties in the 12th district, from 1924 until 1936. In 1940, he co-edited a 4-volume book on the history of the state of Mississippi. He was the Secretary of the State Teachers Retirement System from 1944 until his retirement in 1953. He died in the Baptist Hospital in Jackson, Mississippi, on November 27, 1956, aged 82.

== Personal life ==
Taylor was a Democrat. He married Lois Fuller, who survived him after his death, in 1898. They had three children, a son and two daughters. Taylor's cousin was Mississippi state treasurer John Peroutt Taylor.
