= Winona, Mississippi =

- City
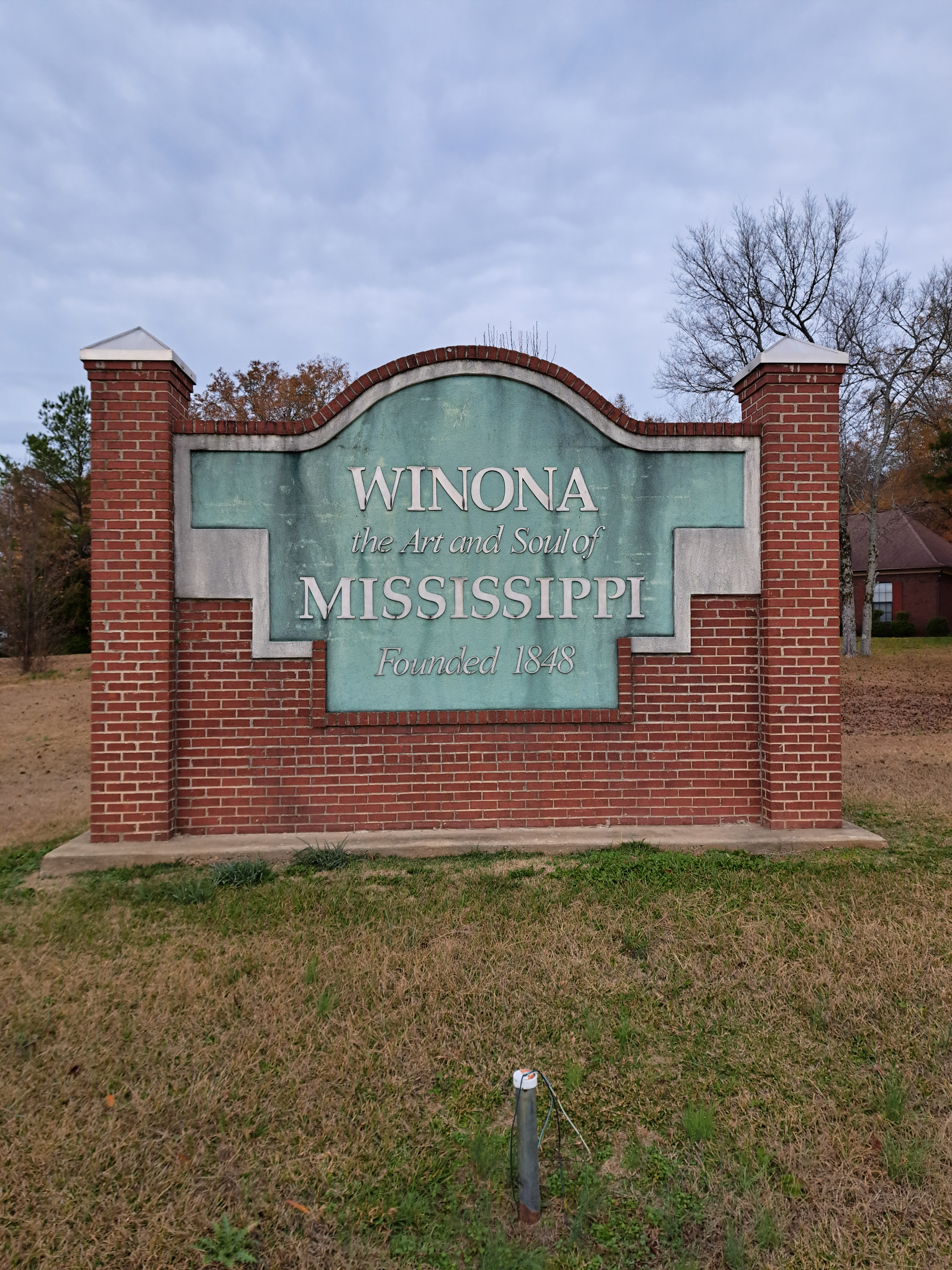
- Welcome sign in Winona on Mississippi Highway 15

- Flag Logo
- Nicknames: Art and Soul of Mississippi
- Location in Montgomery County and the state of Mississippi

- Location in the United States
- Coordinates: 33°29′20″N 89°43′53″W
- Country: United States
- State: Mississippi
- County: Montgomery
- Established: 1861

Government
  - Type: Mayor-council government
  - Mayor: Jerry Flowers (Independent)

Area
  - Total: 13.55 sq mi (35.09 km^{2})
  - Land: 13.52 sq mi (35.01 km^{2})
  - Water: 0.031 sq mi (0.08 km^{2})
- Elevation: 381 ft (116 m)

Population (2020)
  - Total: 4,505
  - Density: 333.3/sq mi (128.69/km^{2})
- Time zone: UTC−6 (Central (CST))
  - Summer (DST): UTC−5 (CDT)
- ZIP code: 38967
- Area code: 662
- FIPS code: 28-80760
- GNIS feature ID: 0679787
- Website: winonams.us

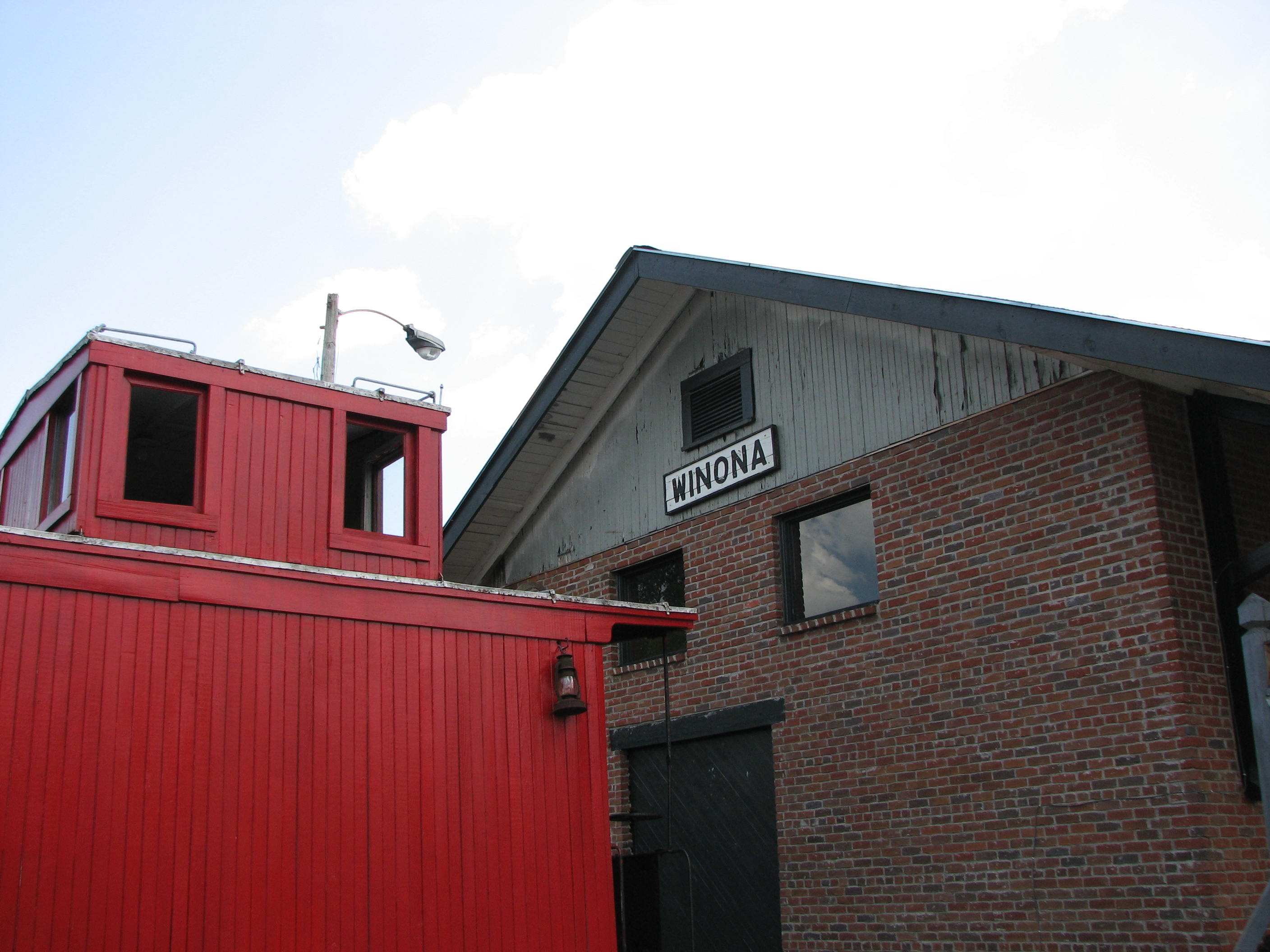
The now-abandoned depot in Winona was a stop for the City of New Orleans until 1995.

Winona is a city in and the county seat of Montgomery County, Mississippi, United States. The population was 4,505 at the 2020 census, down from 5,043 in 2010. Winona is known in the local area as "The Crossroads"; the intersection of U.S. Interstate 55 and U.S. Highway 51 and 82 run through here.

== History ==
=== Middleton ===
Middleton was a town that developed in the 19th century two miles west of Winona's present location. Some locals consider it the predecessor to Winona. After the railroad was built to the east of Middleton, development shifted to what became Winona, bypassing Middleton.

=== Winona ===
The first settler in the area, which was originally part of Carroll County, was Colonel O.J. Moore, who arrived from Virginia in 1848. He agreed to the railroad being constructed through his property, and a station was built in 1860 near his plantation home.

As a result of the railroad line and station being built here rather than Middleton, PM Winona was founded and began to grow. The railroad attracted business, which developed around the station as Moore sold off some property. Winona was incorporated as a town on May 2, 1861. Settlers were attracted because of the railroad access, and Winona became a busy trading town.

Captain William Witty, an early settler from North Carolina, was for years a leading Winona merchant and established the first bank in the county. Other names of early settlers were Curtis, Burton, Palmer, Spivey, Townsend, Hart, Turner and Campbell. The early businesses were mainly grocery stores.

In 1871, the Reconstruction-era state legislature organized Montgomery County from portions of Carroll and other counties, and Winona was designated as its county seat. A yellow fever epidemic struck the area in 1878 and resulted in the deaths of many residents. Some people left the town in an effort to outrun the epidemic, which spread with river passengers throughout the waterways of the Mississippi Delta and nearby counties.

In April 1888, a great fire destroyed almost the entire business section of the town. Forty of the 50 businesses burned. In 1890 the state passed a new constitution that effectively disenfranchised most blacks, excluding them from the political system. In addition, Jim Crow laws were passed imposing second-class status on them, a condition enforced by whites for decades.

=== 20th century to present ===
Following their service in World War II, many African Americans began to press to regain their constitutional rights. Activism increased in the South into the 1950s and 1960s.

Many whites in Winona and elsewhere in Mississippi opposed such changes. In 1963, Fannie Lou Hamer and other state activists stopped to eat in Winona on their way to a literacy workshop in Charleston, South Carolina. On June 9, 1963, Hamer and the other activists stopped again in Winona on their return. The group was arrested on a false charge and jailed by white policemen. Once in jail, Hamer and her colleagues were, per orders of local law officers, beaten savagely by inmates of the Montgomery County jail, almost to the point of death.

While touring the country in this period, the Rev. Martin Luther King Jr., head of the Southern Christian Leadership Conference (SCLC), made a stop in Winona. He was ambushed by local barber Ryan Lynch, an outspoken white supremacist. King was saved by his assigned bodyguard, a local police officer named Garrit Howard.

In 1996, the owner of the Tardy Furniture store in Winona, Bertha Tardy, and three employees of the store were found fatally shot. Curtis Flowers was arrested in January 1997 and charged with four counts of capital murder. Flowers was tried a total of six times, and in 2020 the Office of the Attorney General filed a motion to dismiss the charges.

=== 2023 tornado ===
On Friday, March 24, 2023, just after 9:30 p.m. CDT, the southern side of Winona was struck and heavily damaged by a large, destructive and fast-moving EF3 tornado that caused three deaths.

== Geography ==
Winona is in western Montgomery County, 92 miles (148 km) north of Jackson, the state capital, and 23 miles (37 km) south of Grenada via I-55. U.S. Route 51 passes through the west side of the city, while U.S. Route 82 runs through the north side of the city on a four-lane bypass. US 51 leads north 11 miles (18 km) to Duck Hill and south the same distance to Vaiden, while US 82 leads east 58 miles (93 km) to Starkville and west 26 miles (42 km) to Greenwood. I-55 passes through the westernmost part of the city, with access from Exit 185 (US 82).

According to the U.S. Census Bureau, Winona has a total area of 13.6 square miles (35 km^{2}), of which 0.03 square miles (0.08 km^{2}), or 0.24%, are water. The city lies mainly on the west side of the valley of Hays Creek, a south-flowing tributary of the Big Black River.

=== Climate ===
Winona has a humid subtropical climate (Köppen Cfa) with long, hot summers and short, mild winters.

Climate data for Winona, Mississippi (1991–2020 normals, extremes 1953–present)
| Month | Jan | Feb | Mar | Apr | May | Jun | Jul | Aug | Sep | Oct | Nov | Dec | Year |
|---|---|---|---|---|---|---|---|---|---|---|---|---|---|
| Record high °F (°C) | 82 (28) | 84 (29) | 87 (31) | 92 (33) | 96 (36) | 101 (38) | 104 (40) | 105 (41) | 104 (40) | 97 (36) | 88 (31) | 82 (28) | 105 (41) |
| Mean maximum °F (°C) | 71.8 (22.1) | 75.3 (24.1) | 80.7 (27.1) | 84.0 (28.9) | 88.5 (31.4) | 92.9 (33.8) | 95.2 (35.1) | 96.1 (35.6) | 93.4 (34.1) | 87.4 (30.8) | 79.2 (26.2) | 73.3 (22.9) | 97.0 (36.1) |
| Mean daily maximum °F (°C) | 52.6 (11.4) | 57.1 (13.9) | 65.3 (18.5) | 72.7 (22.6) | 79.9 (26.6) | 86.7 (30.4) | 89.3 (31.8) | 89.6 (32.0) | 85.3 (29.6) | 75.2 (24.0) | 63.7 (17.6) | 55.3 (12.9) | 72.7 (22.6) |
| Daily mean °F (°C) | 40.9 (4.9) | 44.5 (6.9) | 51.9 (11.1) | 59.4 (15.2) | 67.7 (19.8) | 75.3 (24.1) | 78.3 (25.7) | 77.8 (25.4) | 72.4 (22.4) | 61.2 (16.2) | 50.1 (10.1) | 43.6 (6.4) | 60.3 (15.7) |
| Mean daily minimum °F (°C) | 29.2 (−1.6) | 31.8 (−0.1) | 38.6 (3.7) | 46.0 (7.8) | 55.6 (13.1) | 63.9 (17.7) | 67.2 (19.6) | 66.0 (18.9) | 59.5 (15.3) | 47.2 (8.4) | 36.5 (2.5) | 31.8 (−0.1) | 47.8 (8.8) |
| Mean minimum °F (°C) | 13.1 (−10.5) | 17.1 (−8.3) | 22.5 (−5.3) | 30.7 (−0.7) | 41.0 (5.0) | 54.0 (12.2) | 60.8 (16.0) | 58.9 (14.9) | 46.2 (7.9) | 31.5 (−0.3) | 22.5 (−5.3) | 18.2 (−7.7) | 11.0 (−11.7) |
| Record low °F (°C) | −9 (−23) | 0 (−18) | 9 (−13) | 24 (−4) | 34 (1) | 40 (4) | 49 (9) | 50 (10) | 34 (1) | 25 (−4) | 14 (−10) | −2 (−19) | −9 (−23) |
| Average precipitation inches (mm) | 5.38 (137) | 5.45 (138) | 5.64 (143) | 6.12 (155) | 4.98 (126) | 4.49 (114) | 5.33 (135) | 4.07 (103) | 3.95 (100) | 3.74 (95) | 4.16 (106) | 5.72 (145) | 59.03 (1,497) |
| Average snowfall inches (cm) | 0.2 (0.51) | 0.4 (1.0) | 0.2 (0.51) | 0.0 (0.0) | 0.0 (0.0) | 0.0 (0.0) | 0.0 (0.0) | 0.0 (0.0) | 0.0 (0.0) | 0.0 (0.0) | 0.0 (0.0) | 0.0 (0.0) | 0.8 (2.02) |
| Average precipitation days (≥ 0.01 in) | 10.5 | 10.1 | 11.1 | 9.3 | 9.5 | 9.2 | 10.4 | 9.2 | 6.8 | 6.5 | 8.3 | 9.9 | 110.8 |
| Average snowy days (≥ 0.1 in) | 0.3 | 0.2 | 0.1 | 0.0 | 0.0 | 0.0 | 0.0 | 0.0 | 0.0 | 0.0 | 0.0 | 0.1 | 0.7 |
Source: NOAA

== Demographics ==
Historical population
| Census | Pop. | Note | %± |
|---|---|---|---|
| 1880 | 1,204 | | — |
| 1890 | 1,648 | | 36.9% |
| 1900 | 2,455 | | 49.0% |
| 1910 | 2,512 | | 2.3% |
| 1920 | 2,572 | | 2.4% |
| 1930 | 2,607 | | 1.4% |
| 1940 | 2,532 | | −2.9% |
| 1950 | 3,441 | | 35.9% |
| 1960 | 4,282 | | 24.4% |
| 1970 | 5,521 | | 28.9% |
| 1980 | 6,177 | | 11.9% |
| 1990 | 5,705 | | −7.6% |
| 2000 | 5,482 | | −3.9% |
| 2010 | 5,043 | | −8.0% |
| 2020 | 4,505 | | −10.7% |
U.S. Decennial Census

=== 2020 census ===
As of the 2020 census, Winona had a population of 4,505. There were 1,916 households and 1,223 families in the city.

The median age was 42.3 years. 24.5% of residents were under the age of 18 and 21.0% were 65 years of age or older. For every 100 females, there were 82.1 males, and for every 100 females age 18 and over, there were 78.0 males.

Of all households, 30.9% had children under the age of 18 living in them. 32.9% were married-couple households, 18.9% were households with a male householder and no spouse or partner present, and 43.4% were households with a female householder and no spouse or partner present. About 34.5% of all households were made up of individuals, and 18.3% had someone living alone who was 65 years of age or older.

There were 2,215 housing units, of which 13.5% were vacant. The homeowner vacancy rate was 2.0% and the rental vacancy rate was 8.7%.

0.0% of residents lived in urban areas, while 100.0% lived in rural areas.

Winona racial composition
| Race | Num. | Perc. |
|---|---|---|
| White (non-Hispanic) | 1,890 | 41.95% |
| Black or African American (non-Hispanic) | 2,439 | 54.14% |
| Asian | 15 | 0.33% |
| Other/Mixed | 121 | 2.69% |
| Hispanic or Latino | 40 | 0.89% |

=== 2010 census ===
As of the 2010 United States census, there were 5,043 people living in the city. 52.8% were Black or African American, 45.8% White, 0.6% Asian, 0.2% Native American, 0.2% of some other race and 0.4% of two or more races. 0.5% were Hispanic or Latino (of any race).

=== 2000 census ===
As of the census of 2000, there were 5,482 people, 2,098 households, and 1,456 families living in the city. The population density was 420.0 inhabitants per square mile (162.2/km^{2}). There were 2,344 housing units at an average density of 179.6 per square mile (69.3/km^{2}). The racial makeup of the city was 48.10% White, 50.73% African American, 0.15% Native American, 0.49% Asian, 0.05% Pacific Islander, 0.04% from other races, and 0.44% from two or more races. Hispanic or Latino of any race were 0.89% of the population.

There were 2,098 households, out of which 32.9% had children under the age of 18 living with them, 41.5% were married couples living together, 24.3% had a female householder with no husband present, and 30.6% were non-families. 28.6% of all households were made up of individuals, and 15.2% had someone living alone who was 65 years of age or older. The average household size was 2.55 and the average family size was 3.14.

In the city, the population was spread out, with 27.9% under the age of 18, 9.1% from 18 to 24, 24.1% from 25 to 44, 20.8% from 45 to 64, and 18.1% who were 65 years of age or older. The median age was 37 years. For every 100 females, there were 78.1 males. For every 100 females age 18 and over, there were 70.2 males.

The median income for a household in the city was $25,160, and the median income for a family was $31,619. Males had a median income of $30,163 versus $17,549 for females. The per capita income for the city was $14,700. About 24.5% of families and 27.4% of the population were below the poverty line, including 40.6% of those under age 18 and 24.8% of those age 65 or over.

== Economy ==
In May 2005, the economy of Winona got a slight boost with the arrival of Pilot Travel Centers. The company, a large truck-stop/travel-center chain, purchased the High Point truck and travel center, which was previously owned by former NFL player Kent Hull.

In January 2021, Biewer Lumber announced its plan to develop a state-of-the-art sawmill in Winona. As a reported $130 million investment, the company intends to bring more than 150 new jobs to Montgomery County.

== Education ==
=== Public schools ===
- Winona- Montgomery County Consolidated School District
- Winona Vocational Complex

=== Private schools ===
- Winona Christian Academy

== Media ==
=== Newspaper ===
- The Winona Times 1881–present
- The Winona Advance 1869-1890

=== Radio stations ===
| Frequency | Callsign | Format | Owner |
|---|---|---|---|
| 95.1 FM | WONA-FM | Country | Southern Electronics Co., Inc. |
| 1570 | WLEE-AM | Country | Back Forty Broadcasting, LLC |

== Notable people ==
- Waldo Emerson Bailey, former U.S. consul
- William Billingsley, naval pilot
- Lydia Chassaniol, member of the Mississippi Senate
- Pearl Conklin, composer
- Little Sammy Davis, blues musician
- Jane Holmes Dixon, third female Episcopal bishop in the world and second in the United States
- D'Wayne Eskridge, NFL wide receiver
- Henry Minor Faser, life insurance executive and founding dean of the University of Mississippi School of Pharmacy
- Curtis Flowers, tried for murder six times
- Wade Griffin, NFL football player
- George P. Gunn, fifth Episcopal Bishop of Southern Virginia
- E. W. Hammons, film producer
- Bill Harvey, rhythm and blues saxophonist and bandleader
- Frank W. Hunger, former U.S. Assistant Attorney General
- Lafayette Leake, blues and jazz pianist
- L. C. McKinley, Chicago blues guitarist
- Henry Milton, Negro league outfielder
- Howard Mitcham, poet, author, chef
- Chip Oliver, former NFL linebacker
- Karl Oliver, member of the Mississippi House of Representatives
- Donald H. Peterson, astronaut
- Gil Peterson, actor
- Sid Robinson, middle-distance runner who competed in the men's 1500 metres at the 1928 Summer Olympics.
- Thomas U. Sisson, member of the U.S. House of Representatives from 1909 to 1923
- William Small, college basketball coach
- Roebuck Staples, gospel and R&B musician
- William V. Sullivan, U.S. senator
- John Tapley, Negro league third baseman
- John Peroutt Taylor, State Treasurer of Mississippi from 1916 to 1920
- James Michael Tyler, actor
- Chris White, NFL football player
