= National Register of Historic Places listings in Carroll County, Mississippi =

Location of Carroll County in Mississippi

This is a list of the National Register of Historic Places listings in Carroll County, Mississippi.

This is intended to be a complete list of the properties and districts on the National Register of Historic Places in Carroll County, Mississippi, United States. Latitude and longitude coordinates are provided for many National Register properties and districts; these locations may be seen together in a map.

There are 13 properties and districts listed on the National Register in the county.

This National Park Service list is complete through NPS recent listings posted October 30, 2026.

== Current listings ==
	Name on the Register	Image	Date listed	Location	City or town	Description
1	Abiaca Creek Bridge		March 22, 2004 (#04000218)	Nebo Rd., about 0.3 miles north of Mississippi Highway 430, near Black Hawk; 33°19′57″N 89°56′57″W	Vaiden	
2	Carrollton Community House		May 13, 2019 (#100003951)	305 Lexington St. 33°30′09″N 89°55′17″W	Carrollton	
3	Carrollton Historic District	Carrollton Historic District	November 27, 1978 (#78001590)	Mississippi Highway 35; 33°30′33″N 89°55′16″W	Carrollton	
4	Carrollton Water Tower	Carrollton Water Tower	February 3, 2022 (#100007424)	100 Lexington St. Extended; 33°30′16″N 89°55′10″W	Carrollton	
5	Cotesworth	Cotesworth	June 9, 1978 (#78001592)	North of North Carrollton on Old Grenada Rd. 33°32′13″N 89°54′33″W	North Carrollton	
6	French Site (22HO565)	French Site (22HO565)	November 6, 1986 (#86002328)	Address restricted	Oklahoma	Extends into Holmes County
7	James Z. George Law Office		January 13, 1972 (#72000687)	Washington St. between Lexington and Green Sts. 33°30′28″N 89°55′09″W	Carrollton	
8	Malmaison Site	Malmaison Site	August 25, 1970 (#70000317)	Address restricted	Carrollton	
9	Merrill's Store		January 13, 1972 (#72000688)	Jackson and Lexington Sts. 33°30′26″N 89°55′09″W	Carrollton	
10	Midway Methodist Church and Cemetery		November 30, 2011 (#11000868)	County Road 31; 33°18′12″N 89°50′20″W	Vaiden vicinity	
11	Rowland Site	Rowland Site	June 23, 1978 (#78001591)	Address restricted	Greenwood	
12	Teoc Creek Site	Teoc Creek Site	May 6, 1971 (#71000445)	Address restricted	Avalon	
13	Vaiden High School		November 5, 2009 (#09000883)	504 Mulberry St. 33°19′51″N 89°44′41″W	Vaiden	

== See also ==
- List of National Historic Landmarks in Mississippi
- National Register of Historic Places listings in Mississippi
