= Joseph Drake (soldier) =

American military figure and politician

- Born: June 14, 1806; Nicholas County, Kentucky
- Died: November 24, 1878 (aged 72); Carroll County, Mississippi
- Burial place: 1 mi E of McCarley, Carroll County, Mississippi
- Military career
- Allegiance: United States of America; Confederate States of America
- Branch: Infantry
- Service years: 1861 – 1862
- Rank: Colonel
- Commands: 4th Mississippi infantry Tilghman's 2nd Brigade; Johnson's 3rd brigade
- Conflicts: American Civil War; Battle of Fort Henry; Battle of Fort Donelson

Joseph Drake (June 14, 1806 – October 24, 1878) lawyer and plantation owner, was a Colonel in the Confederate States Army during the American Civil War, who commanded a brigade in two major battles. He was also a member of the Mississippi Legislature before and during the war.

== Early life ==
His grandfather Joseph Drake was one of Daniel Boone's Kentucky "Long Hunters" and was killed by Indians near Boonesborough, Kentucky in August, 1778. Sometime between 1807 and 1816 his family moved to Bedford County, Tennessee and later to Franklin County, Tennessee. He attended Washington and Lee University in Lexington, Virginia during 1825–26. Joseph registered and was sworn in as an attorney and counselor at law of Carroll County, Mississippi in 1834. In 1835, Drake served in the capacity of district attorney of the Circuit Court of the county. He was married there on November 14, 1837, to Martha M. Burton. He represented Carroll County in the Mississippi House of Representatives from 1838 to 1839 and was a probate Judge of Carroll County, from 1855 to 1861.

== Civil War ==
Joseph Drake was Captain of Company H, "Carroll County Rebels," which mustered into State service at Carrollton, Mississippi August 24, 1861 and organized at Grenada, Mississippi as the Fourth Regiment, Second Brigade, Army of Mississippi, and enlisted for twelve months. He was elected Colonel on September 11 in a camp near Trenton, Tennessee.

This regiment was then put under Van Dorn's command. After being promoted to major general on September 19, 1861, Van Dorn was transferred to Virginia and on October 4, was given command of the 1st Division in Beauregard's corps in the Army of the Potomac, under Joseph E. Johnston. The Fourth Mississippi infantry, which had been detached from Van Dorn's division of the Army of the Potomac, was one of the two regiments at Fort Henry which were at all experienced in war, and the men conducted themselves as veterans. Col. Joseph Drake sent two companies of Mississippians to meet the first advance of the enemy on February 4, who held the rifle-pits alone until reinforced. During the bombardment of the 6th, which resulted in the surrender of Fort Henry, Colonel Drake commanded General Tilghman's Second Brigade.

After the naval attack compelled the surrender of Fort Henry, Drake retreated to Fort Donelson, where he commanded Brig. Gen. Bushrod Johnson's 3rd brigade. The Fourth was under fire in the trenches at Donelson during February 13 and 14, and participated in the assault which was made on the 15th for the purpose of opening a line of retreat. Gen. Johnson reported that Drake's Brigade, under its very gallant, steady and efficient commander, moved in admirable order, almost constantly under fire, driving the enemy slowly from hill to hill until about 1 p.m., when he was instructed to return to the rifle pits, leaving Drake's Brigade for a time unsupported. Col. Nathan Bedford Forrest went to Drake's support and advised him to fall back, which he did without disorder. Col. Smith's brigade advanced a short distance up the hill, repeatedly rushing and then falling to the ground in the prone position, all the while listening to taunts from Drake's Confederate brigade opposing them.

The surrender followed on the 16th. It is said that Colonel Drake broke his sword and threw it in the river when told of the surrender. His son John Beckenridge Drake (1840–1922) joined Company K, 30th Mississippi infantry on February 27, 1862, shortly after his father was captured. He was imprisoned at Johnson's Island, then admitted Feb 21 1862 to U.S.A. Prison Hospital, Camp Douglas Chicago, Illinois received at Camp Chase Columbus, Ohio on March 1, transferred March 6, to Fort Warren, Boston and released on parole on 7 April for the purpose of exchange for Colonel Milton Cogswell, 42d New York Volunteers, April 11, 1862, awaiting exchange at Baltimore, to report to Maj. Gen. John E. Wool at Fort Monroe, Virginia. He retired after he was exchanged on August 27, 1862, considered too old for active service. He was 56.

== Postbellum career ==
Drake returned to his plantation and served as a member the Mississippi Senate from Carroll County in 1864.
