= Mississippi Highway 430 =

State Highway in Mississippi

Mississippi Highway 430

Route information
- Maintained by MDOT and Carroll County
- Length: 34.5 mi (55.5 km)
- Existed: 1956–present

Major junctions
- West end: US 82 / MS 7 in Greenwood
- MS 17 in Blackhawk; MS 35 in Vaiden; I-55 in Vaiden
- East end: US 51 in Vaiden

Location
- Country: United States
- State: Mississippi
- Counties: Leflore, Carroll

Highway system
- Mississippi State Highway System; Interstate; US; State
← MS 429	→ MS 431

Mississippi Highway 430 (MS 430) is a 34.5-mile-long (55.5 km) east-west state highway in north-central Mississippi. It runs from the city of Greenwood, through the community of Blackhawk, to the town of Vaiden.

== Route description ==
MS 430 begins in the Mississippi Delta region in Leflore County in the city of Greenwood at an intersection with U.S. Route 82 (US 82)/MS 7 just southeast of downtown. It heads southeast as a four-lane undivided highway through neighborhoods before leaving Greenwood and narrowing to two-lanes. The highway then crosses over Pelucia Creek before entering Carroll County.

State maintenance of the highway temporarily ends at the county line as MS 430 travels southeast through farmland. It winds its way up some Loess bluffs, where it climbs out of the Mississippi Delta as it gains some serious elevation. The highway travels through a mix of farmland and wooded areas for about nine miles (14 km) to pass through Blackhawk, where it has an intersection with MS 17. State maintenance resumes at this intersection. MS 430 passes remote woodlands for about ten miles (16 km) before re-entering farmland and entering the Vaiden city limits, where it comes to an intersection and runs concurrently with MS 35. They head west to have an interchange with Interstate 55 (I-55) at its exit 174 before MS 430 splits off along Mulberry Street and passes straight through downtown. MS 430 comes to an end shortly thereafter at an intersection with US 51.

== Major intersections ==
County	Location	mi	km	Destinations	Notes
Leflore	Greenwood	0.000	0.000	US 82 / MS 7 – Greenville, Winona	Eastern terminus
Carroll	Blackhawk	16.945	27.270	MS 17 – Carrollton, Lexington	
Carroll	Vaiden	31.909	51.353	MS 35 north – Carrollton	Western end of MS 35 concurrency
Carroll	Vaiden	32.326– 32.464	52.024– 52.246	I-55 – Jackson, Grenada	I-55 exit 174
Carroll	Vaiden	33.065	53.213	MS 35 south – Kosciusko, Durant	Eastern end of MS 35 concurrency
Carroll	Vaiden	34.532	55.574	US 51 (Front Street)	Eastern terminus
1.000 mi = 1.609 km; 1.000 km = 0.621 mi: Concurrency terminus
