= National Register of Historic Places listings in Holmes County, Mississippi =

Location of Holmes County in Mississippi

This is a list of the National Register of Historic Places listings in Holmes County, Mississippi.

This is intended to be a complete list of the properties and districts on the National Register of Historic Places in Holmes County, Mississippi, United States. Latitude and longitude coordinates are provided for many National Register properties and districts; these locations may be seen together in a map.

There are 17 properties and districts listed on the National Register in the county.

This National Park Service list is complete through NPS recent listings posted April 4, 2025.

== Current listings ==
	Name on the Register	Image	Date listed	Location	City or town	Description
1	Acona Church, Cemetery, and School	Acona Church, Cemetery, and School	March 20, 2002 (#02000210)	Mississippi Highway 17; 33°16′05″N 90°01′08″W	Lexington	
2	Mollie Clark House		September 15, 1980 (#80002249)	2221 Yazoo St. 32°53′04″N 89°58′31″W	Pickens	
3	Clifton Plantation House		October 3, 1985 (#85002721)	Off Mississippi Highway 12; 33°07′55″N 90°11′05″W	Howard	
4	Joe Cowsert Place Site (22HO507)		February 27, 1987 (#87000227)	Address restricted	Goodman	
5	Durant Illinois Central Railroad Depot	Durant Illinois Central Railroad Depot	January 19, 2016 (#15000988)	436 E. Mulberry St. 33°04′27″N 89°51′11″W	Durant	
6	Eureka Masonic College	Eureka Masonic College	November 10, 1970 (#70000318)	On Mississippi Highway 17; 32°58′25″N 89°59′11″W	Richland	
7	French Site (22HO565)		November 6, 1986 (#86002328)	Address restricted	Cruger	Extends into Carroll County
8	Holmes County Courthouse Complex	Holmes County Courthouse Complex	November 10, 1994 (#94001301)	Court Sq. 33°06′45″N 90°03′10″W	Lexington	
9	Holmes County State Park	Holmes County State Park	July 25, 1997 (#97000769)	Between Interstate 55 and U.S. Highway 51, 1 mile south of Durant; 33°01′48″N 89°55′27″W	Durant	
10	Frances Lee Mound Group (22HO654)		April 6, 1988 (#88000236)	Address restricted	Tchula	
11	Lexington Historic District		July 19, 2001 (#01000754)	Roughly Courthouse Sq., along Yazoo, Vine, Tchula, Boulevard, Springs, Race Sts., and Old Tchula Rd. 33°06′53″N 90°02′59″W	Lexington	
12	Gov. Edmund F. Noel House		November 18, 1999 (#99001360)	315 North St. 33°06′57″N 90°03′00″W	Lexington	
13	Old Hoover Place Site (22HO502)		March 1, 1987 (#87000132)	Address restricted	Pickens	
14	Oswego Site (22HO658)		April 6, 1988 (#88000235)	Address restricted	Tchula	
15	Providence Mound (22HO609)		March 1, 1987 (#87000136)	Address restricted	Lexington	
16	Tye House		December 18, 1979 (#79001315)	2440 N. 1st St. 32°53′14″N 89°58′42″W	Pickens	
17	West Historic District		September 14, 1993 (#93000646)	Roughly bounded by Emory St., Anderson Ave., and Cross St., and the Illinois Central railroad tracks 33°11′55″N 89°46′48″W	West	

== See also ==
- List of National Historic Landmarks in Mississippi
- National Register of Historic Places listings in Mississippi
