= John A. Pittman =

John Albert Pittman
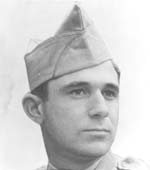
- Medal of Honor recipient John Pittman
- Born: October 15, 1928; Carrollton, Mississippi
- Died: April 8, 1995 (aged 66); Greenwood, Mississippi
- Burial place: New Hope Church Cemetery, Black Hawk, Carroll County, Mississippi
- Military career
- Allegiance: United States of America
- Branch: United States Army
- Service years: 1947–1951
- Rank: Sergeant
- Units: Company C, 23rd Infantry Regiment, 2nd Infantry Division
- Conflicts: Korean War
- Awards: Medal of Honor; Purple Hearts (2)

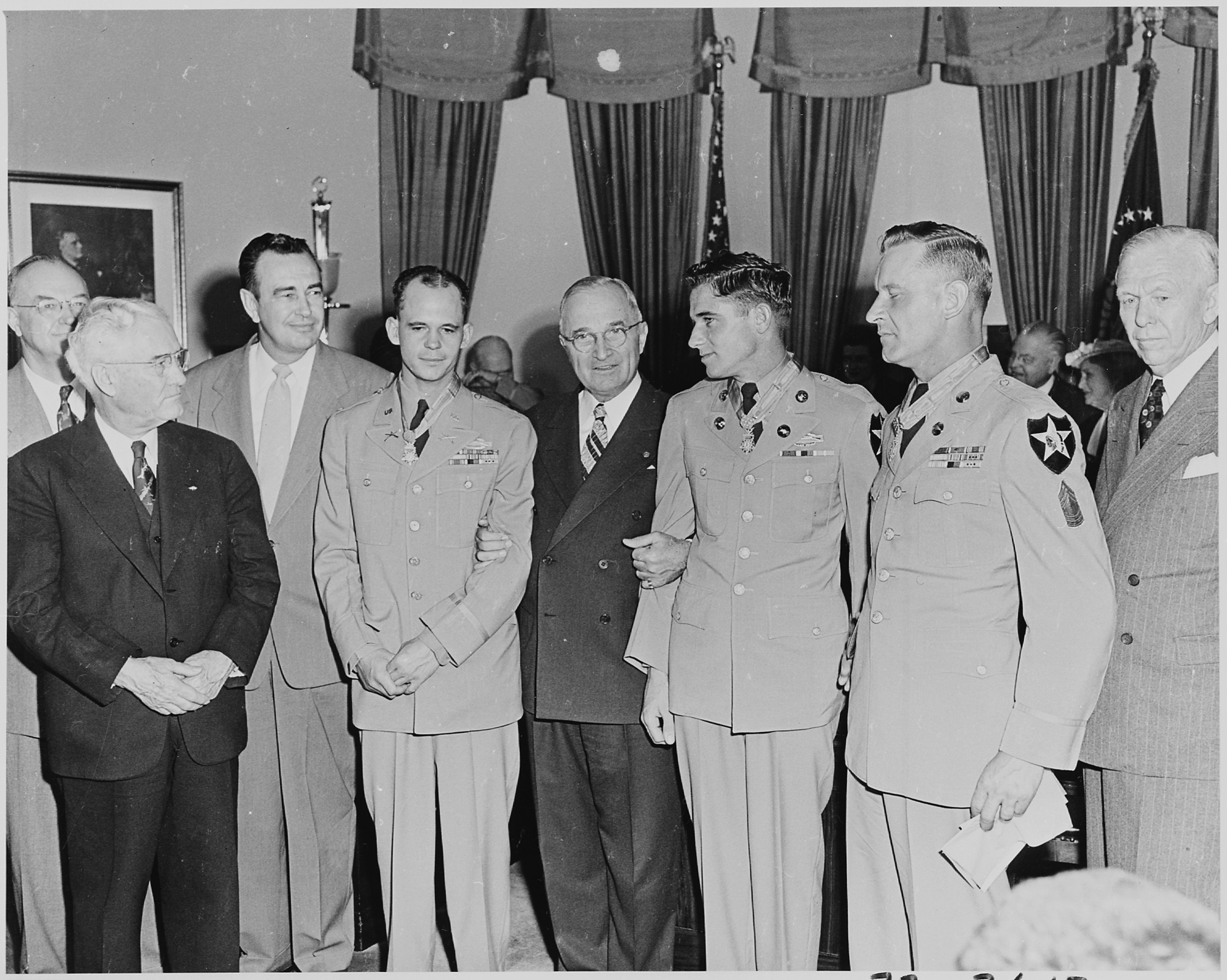
President Harry S. Truman (center) with Pittman, standing to the President's left, and other Medal of Honor recipients shortly after presenting them with their medals

John Albert Pittman (October 15, 1928 – April 8, 1995) was a soldier in the United States Army during the Korean War. He received the Medal of Honor for his actions on November 26, 1950, during the Battle of the Ch'ongch'on River.

He is buried in New Hope Cemetery, Carroll County, Mississippi.

== Medal of Honor citation ==
Rank and organization: Sergeant, U.S. Army, Company C, 23rd Infantry Regiment, 2nd Infantry Division

Place and date: Near Kujangdong, Korea, November 26, 1950

Entered service at: Carrollton, Mississippi Born: October 15, 1928, Carrollton, Mississippi

G.O. No.: 39, June 4, 1951

Citation:

Sgt. Pittman, distinguished himself by conspicuous gallantry and intrepidity above and beyond the call of duty in action against the enemy. He volunteered to lead his squad in a counterattack to regain commanding terrain lost in an earlier engagement. Moving aggressively forward in the face of intense artillery, mortar, and small-arms fire he was wounded by mortar fragments. Disregarding his wounds he continued to lead and direct his men in a bold advance against the hostile standpoint. During this daring action, an enemy grenade was thrown in the midst of his squad endangering the lives of his comrades. Without hesitation, Sgt. Pittman threw himself on the grenade and absorbed its burst with his body. When a medical aid man reached him, his first request was to be informed as to how many of his men were hurt. This intrepid and selfless act saved several of his men from death or serious injury and was an inspiration to the entire command. Sgt. Pittman's extraordinary heroism reflects the highest credit upon himself and is in keeping with the esteemed traditions of the military service.

== Awards and decorations ==

Badge	Combat Infantryman Badge		
1st row	Medal of Honor		Purple Heart with 1 Oak leaf cluster
2nd row	Army Good Conduct Medal	Army of Occupation Medal	National Defense Service Medal
3rd row	Korean Service Medal with 1 Campaign star	United Nations Service Medal Korea	Korean War Service Medal Retroactively Awarded, 2003
Unit awards	Korean Presidential Unit Citation		

== See also ==
- List of Medal of Honor recipients
- List of Korean War Medal of Honor recipients
