= Lewis S. Hemphill =

American politician (1853–1924)

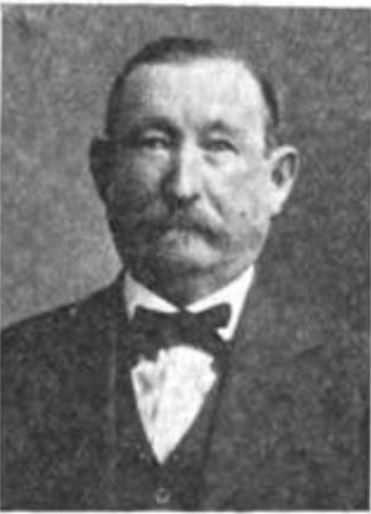
- c. 1917

Member of the Mississippi State Senate from the 26th district
- In office January 1916 – January 1920

Member of the Mississippi House of Representatives from the Carroll County district
- In office January 1912 – January 1916
- In office 1897 – January 1904
- Preceded by: W. F. Stevens

Personal details
- Born: March 9, 1853 Valley Hill, Mississippi
- Died: March 10, 1924 (aged 71) Valley Hill, Mississippi
- Party: Democratic
- Children: 4

Lewis Simpson "Sim" Hemphill (March 9, 1853 - March 10, 1924) was an American politician and farmer. A Democrat, he served in both houses of the Mississippi Legislature in the late 19th and early 20th centuries.

== Early life ==
Lewis Simpson Hemphill was born on March 9, 1853, in Valley Hill, Mississippi. He was the son of James Simpson Hemphill and his wife, Anne Eliza (Mabry) Hemphill. He attended the public schools of his native Carroll County, Mississippi, and then became a farmer.

== Political career ==
Hemphill was selected as the Chairman of the executive committee of Carroll County in 1892, and held that position for several years. In 1896, Hemphill was elected to fill an unexpired term and represent Carroll County as a Democrat in the Mississippi House of Representatives, taking office in 1897. He was re-elected in 1899 to a full term and served from 1900 to 1904. He was again elected to the House in 1911 and served in the 1912–1916 term. In 1915, Hemphill was elected to represent the 26th District in the Mississippi State Senate for the 1916–1920 term.

== Personal life and death ==
Hemphill married Ida Julia Martin on December 16, 1885. They had four children, named Bessie, James Simpson, Everett Martin, and Vassar Dewey. Hemphill died on March 10, 1924, in Valley Hill.
