= George Redditt =

American politician (1863–1953)

Member of the Mississippi House of Representatives from the Carroll County district
- In office January 1916 – January 1920

Personal details
- Born: George Irby Redditt; September 2, 1863 Teoc, Mississippi
- Died: October 1, 1953 (aged 90) Morgan City, Mississippi
- Party: Democratic
- Spouse: Maybell Alice Hill (m. 1893)
- Education: Tulane University (MD)

George Irby Redditt (September 2, 1863 – October 1, 1953) was an American politician. He was a Democratic member of the Mississippi House of Representatives, representing Carroll County from 1916 to 1920.

== Biography ==
George Irby Redditt was born on September 2, 1863, in Teoc, Carroll County, Mississippi. His parents were David Lorenzo Redditt and Mary Elizabeth Redditt (née Sledge). He received his Doctor of Medicine from Tulane University in 1889. He married Maybell Alice Hill in 1893. After retiring from practicing medicine after 12 years of doing so, he was elected vice president of the People's Bank of North Carrollton, Mississippi. In 1915, he was elected to represent his native Carroll County in the Mississippi House of Representatives. He served from 1916 to 1920. He continued practicing medicine afterwards, retiring after 60 years of doing so in 1949. He died in Morgan City, Mississippi, on October 1, 1953.
