= Mississippi Highway 17 =

State Highway in Mississippi

Mississippi Highway 17

Route information
- Maintained by MDOT
- Length: 70.4 mi (113.3 km) (68.51 mi excluding concurrencies)
- Existed: 1939–present

Major junctions
- South end: MS 16 in Farmhaven
- US 51 in Pickens; I-55 near Richland; MS 12 in Lexington; US 82 in Carrollton; MS 35 in North Carrollton
- North end: CR 17 in North Carrollton

Location
- Country: United States
- State: Mississippi
- Counties: Madison, Yazoo, Holmes, Carroll

Highway system
- Mississippi State Highway System; Interstate; US; State
← MS 16	→ MS 18

Mississippi Highway 17 (MS 17) is a state highway in central Mississippi. It runs from north to south for 70.4 miles (113.3 km), serving the counties of Madison, a small portion of Yazoo, Holmes, and Carroll.

== Route description ==
MS 17 begins in rural Madison County near the community of Farmhaven at an intersection with MS 16, with the road continuing south into the community as Summerlin Road. The highway winds its way north, then northwest, through mostly wooded areas for several miles, where it has an intersection with MS 43 before passing through Camden. It continues northeast through rural areas for several more miles to come to an intersection and become concurrent (overlapped) with US 51, and they head north to cross the Big Black River into Yazoo County.

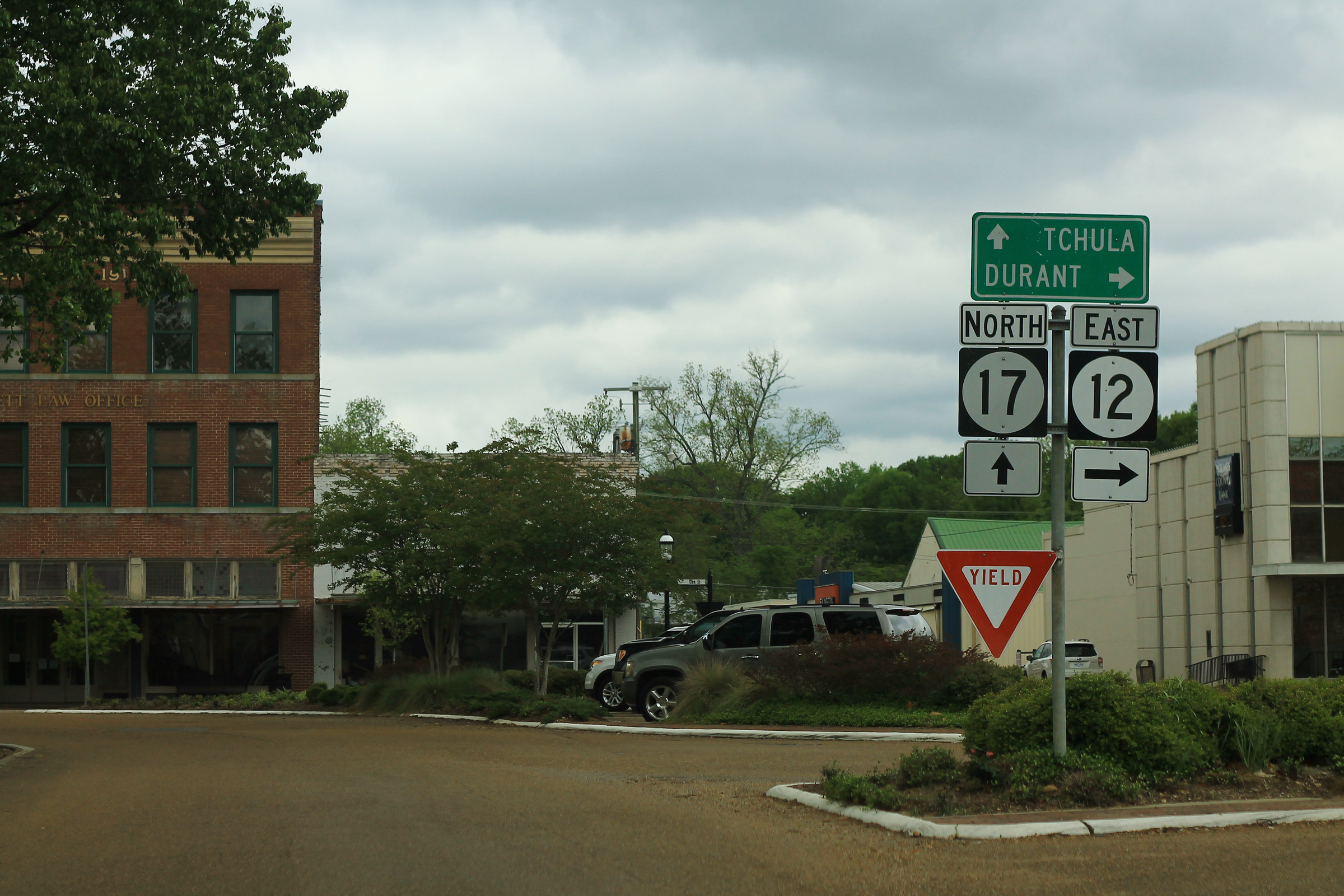
MS 17 and MS 12's traffic circle around the Holmes County Courthouse in downtown Lexington

US 51/MS 17 immediately enter the Pickens city limits and have an intersection with MS 432 before entering Holmes County passing straight through town, bypassing downtown along its west side. MS 17 splits off and heads northwest at the northern edge of town and it leaves Pickens to have an interchange with I-55 (Exit 144). The highway turns northward and travels through a mix of farmland and woodlands for several miles, passing through Richland, where it has a short concurrency with MS 14, and Franklin, before entering the Lexington city limits. MS 17 enters town along Yazoo Street and passes through neighborhoods, where it has an intersection with MS 836 (Lexington Bypass), before entering downtown and traveling through a traffic circle (roundabout) around the Holmes County Courthouse, where it becomes concurrent with MS 12 (Depot Street). They head north along Carrollton Street to leave downtown and pass through neighborhoods, where MS 12 splits off and heads toward Tchula and the Mississippi Delta at a Y-Intersection. MS 17 leaves Lexington and travels through rural areas for several miles, crossing over several small creeks as it passes through Acona before entering Carroll County.

MS 17 heads north through mostly woodlands as passes through Blackhawk, where it has an intersection with MS 430, and Coila before having an intersection with US 82 (where it becomes concurrent with MS 35) and entering Carrollton. MS 17/MS 35 head straight through downtown along Lexington Street before crossing the Big Sand Creek into neighboring North Carrollton. They pass through town along George Street before the two highways split at an intersection with Main Street in downtown, with MS 35 turning left onto Main Street with MS 17 turns right. Main Street becomes Front Street as MS 17 enters neighborhoods, where it makes a left to cross over railroad tracks onto Jefferson Street. It follows Jefferson Street north to the northern edge of the city limits, where state maintenance (and MS 17) ends and the road continues north as Carroll County Road 17 (CR 17, a.k.a. Grenada Road).

The entire length of Mississippi Highway 17 is a two-lane rural highway.

== Major intersections ==
County	Location	mi	km	Destinations	Notes
Madison	Farmhaven	0.0	0.0	MS 16 – Carthage, Canton	Southern terminus
Madison		5.3	8.5	MS 43 – Canton, Thomastown	
Madison		18.5	29.8	US 51 south – Canton	South end of US 51 overlap
Yazoo	Pickens	21.0	33.8	MS 432 west to I-55 – Benton	Eastern terminus of MS 432
Holmes	Pickens	22.9	36.9	US 51 north – Goodman, Durant	North end of US 51 overlap
Holmes		25.5– 25.7	41.0– 41.4	I-55 – Jackson, Grenada	I-55 exit 144
Holmes		27.4	44.1	MS 14 west – Ebenezer	South end of MS 14 overlap
Holmes	Richland	27.9	44.9	MS 14 east to I-55 north – Goodman	North end of MS 14 overlap
Holmes	Lexington	38.5	62.0	MS 836 east (Lexington Bypass) to MS 12 east – Durant	Western terminus of MS 836
Holmes	Lexington	38.8	62.4	MS 12 east (Depot Street) – Durant	South end of MS 12 overlap; traffic circle around Holmes County Courthouse
Holmes	Lexington	39.3	63.2	MS 12 west – Tchula	North end of MS 12 overlap
Carroll	Blackhawk	54.9	88.4	MS 430 – Greenwood, Vaiden	
Carroll	Carrollton	68.3– 68.4	109.9– 110.1	US 82 / MS 35 south – Greenwood, Vaiden, Winona	South end of MS 35 overlap
Carroll	North Carrollton	69.8	112.3	MS 35 north (Main Street) – Holcomb	North end of MS 35 overlap
Carroll		70.4	113.3	CR 17 north (Grenada Road)	Northern terminus; end of state maintenance
1.000 mi = 1.609 km; 1.000 km = 0.621 mi: Concurrency terminus
