= Cotesworth =

Historic house in Mississippi, United States

- U.S. National Register of Historic Places
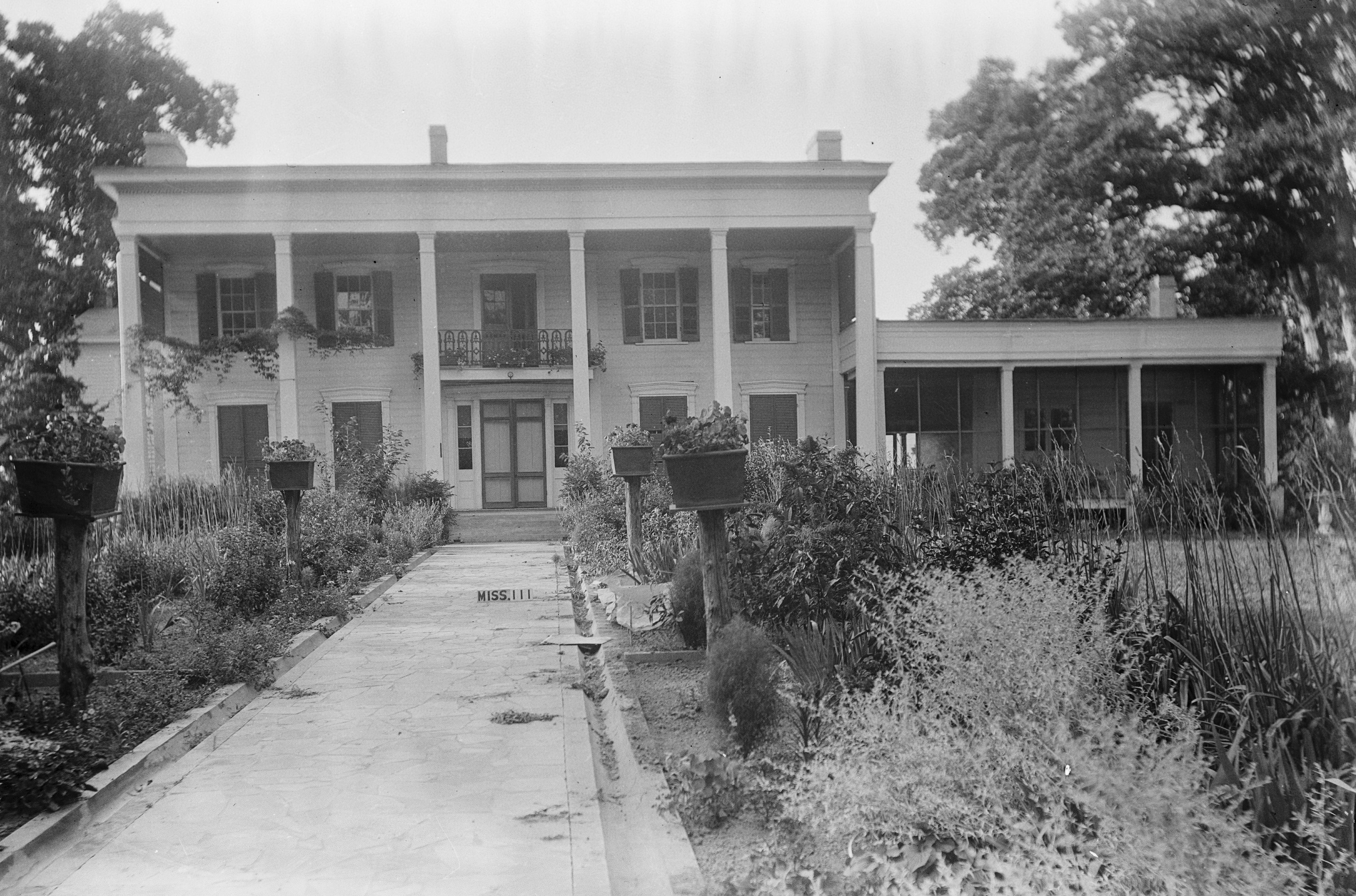
- The house in 1936

- Location within Mississippi Location within the United States
- Location: One mile north of North Carrollton on the old Grenada Road.
- Nearest city: North Carrollton, Mississippi
- Coordinates: 33°32′13.3″N 89°54′32.5″W
- Area: 900 acres (360 ha)
- Built: 1847
- Architectural style: Greek Revival
- NRHP reference No.: 78001592
- Added to NRHP: June 9, 1978

Cotesworth is a historic mansion in North Carrollton, Mississippi, United States.

== Location ==
The mansion is located on Old Grenada Road in North Carrollton, Carroll County, Mississippi.

== History ==
The mansion was built as an inn in the 1840s. In 1847, it was acquired by local lawyer and future United States Senator James Zachariah George, who turned it into a Greek Revival mansion. He named it after Cotesworth P. Smith.

Two decades after the end of the American Civil War, Senator George built "a free-standing hexagonal library" on the grounds.

The mansion stayed in Senator George's family until 2013, when Katharine Saunders Williams, his great-great-granddaughter, donated it to establish the Cotesworth Culture and Heritage Center.

== Heritage significance ==
It has been listed on the National Register of Historic Places since June 9, 1978.
