= Coila, Mississippi =

- Unincorporated community
- Location within Mississippi Location within the United States
- Coordinates: 33°23′43″N 89°58′16″W
- Country: United States
- State: Mississippi
- County: Carroll
- Elevation: 289 ft (88 m)
- Time zone: UTC-6 (Central (CST))
  - Summer (DST): UTC-5 (CDT)
- ZIP code: 38923
- Area code: 662
- GNIS feature ID: 668644

Coila is an unincorporated community located in Carroll County, Mississippi, United States. Coila is situated approximately nine miles south of Carrollton on Highway 17. Coila is part of the Greenwood, Mississippi micropolitan area and its ZIP code is 38923.

"Coila" is a Choctaw phrase which translates to "panther comes there".

A post office first began operation under the name Coila in 1849.

== Notable person ==
- Blues guitarist Brewer Phillips.
