= 4th Mississippi Infantry Regiment =

- Active: 1861-1865
- Country: Confederate States of America
- Allegiance: Mississippi
- Branch: Confederate States Army
- Type: Infantry
- Size: Regiment
- Battles: American Civil War: Battle of Fort Henry; Battle of Fort Donelson; Vicksburg Campaign; Atlanta campaign; Franklin-Nashville Campaign; Battle of Fort Blakeley

The 4th Mississippi Infantry Regiment was a Confederate infantry regiment from Mississippi. The 4th Regiment, formed of volunteer companies from central Mississippi, was captured at the Battle of Fort Donelson, captured again after the Siege of Vicksburg, and then fought in the Atlanta and Tennessee campaigns before surrendering after the Battle of Fort Blakeley in April, 1865.

== History ==
The companies of the 4th regiment were assembled in August, 1861, initially for state service, with an original strength of 787 men. The 4th was sent to Tennessee where it took part in the defense of Fort Henry and Fort Donelson in February, 1862. When Union General Ulysses S. Grant captured the forts, the 4th Regiment was taken prisoner, with most of the men sent to the POW camp at Camp Chase, Ohio. Due to unsanitary conditions, around 100 men of the regiment died while being held prisoner in the North. The regiment's colonel, Joseph Drake, retired from military service after being released from the POW camp.

The regiment was exchanged and reorganized at Ponchatoula, Louisiana in October, 1862, with a reported strength of 279 men. Pierre S. Layton, former chief of ordnance in the Mississippi State Troops was elected as colonel, with Thomas Adair as lieutenant colonel. The regiment was sent to Vicksburg and took part in the defense of the city, fighting at the Battle of Chickasaw Bayou in December. In May, 1863, the 4th fought at the Battle of Port Gibson and the Battle of Big Black River Bridge, and was then moved within the defensive lines of the city, taking some casualties from shelling and Union assaults during the siege. During the Battle of Port Gibson, General William Edwin Baldwin wrote that, "The Fourth Mississippi, Lieutenant-Colonel Adaire, [was] so posted as to bear the severest part of the conflict". The regiment was captured for a second time when the Confederate garrison at Vicksburg surrendered to Union forces on July 4, 1863.

After being exchanged, the 4th was sent to Tennessee in the fall of 1863 to reinforce the troops under General Braxton Bragg who were fighting at Chattanooga, but arrived too late to take part in the battle, instead remaining in camp in north Georgia. The regiment was sent to Mobile, Alabama afterwards, and then in the spring of 1864 was sent back to Georgia to take part in the Atlanta campaign. Thomas Adair was promoted to Colonel and given command of the regiment during the battles around Atlanta, where the 4th Regiment fought at New Hope Church, Cassville, Kennesaw Mountain, Peachtree Creek, and Lovejoy's Station.

During Hood's Tennessee Campaign, the 4th Mississippi fought at Allatoona, and Spring Hill, where Col. Adair was seriously wounded. At Nashville on December 16, the 4th's regimental flag was captured by soldiers of the 5th Minnesota. After the Confederate defeat at Nashville, the regiment retreated to Mississippi. The remnants of the 4th Regiment were then captured after the Battle of Fort Blakeley in Alabama on April 9, 1865, shortly before the final Confederate surrender.

== Commanders ==
Commanders of the 4th Mississippi Infantry:

- Col. Joseph Drake (resigned 1862).
- Col. Pierre S. Layton
- Col. Thomas N. Adair
- Lt. Col. Joseph J. McGee

== Organization ==
Companies of the 4th Mississippi Infantry :

- Company A, "Bankston Guards" of Choctaw County.
- Company B, "Attala Yellow Jackets" of Attala County.
- Company C, "Red Invincibles" of Holmes and Carroll Counties.
- Company D, "Paris Rebels" of Yalobusha County.
- Company E, "Stephens Guard" of Carroll County.
- Company F, "Sons of the South" of Calhoun County.
- Company G, "Nelson Grays" of Holmes County.
- Company H, "Carroll County Rebels"
- Company I, "Benela Sharpshooters" of Attala County.
- Company K, "Center Marksmen" of Attala County.

== See also ==
- List of Mississippi Civil War Confederate units
