= Verell Ferguson =

American politician

Verell Pennington Ferguson
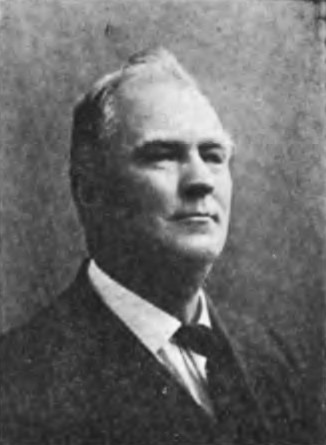

Member of the Mississippi House of Representatives from the Hinds County district
- In office January 1912 – 1923

Personal details
- Born: July 21, 1859 Carroll County, Mississippi, U.S.
- Died: February 4, 1923 (aged 63) Hinds County, Mississippi, U.S.
- Party: Democratic
- Spouse: Eliza Roberts (m. 1877)
- Children: 6

Verell Pennington Ferguson (July 21, 1859 – February 4, 1923) was a Democratic member of the Mississippi House of Representatives for Hinds County from 1912 until his death.

== Biography ==
Verell Pennington Ferguson was born on July 21, 1859, in Vaiden, Carroll County, Mississippi, to Daniel Echols Ferguson and Caroline (Denman) Ferguson. He was of Scotch ancestry. Verell's occupation was a farmer and a planter. He married Eliza Roberts in 1877. He was first elected to the Mississippi House of Representatives, representing Hinds County, in 1911, and was re-elected in 1915 and 1919. He was a Democrat. He died on February 4, 1923, before the end of his term, in his son's house in Learned, Hinds County, Mississippi.
