= Valley Hill, Mississippi =

- Unincorporated community
- Location within Mississippi Location within the United States
- Coordinates: 33°30′15″N 90°03′40″W
- Country: United States
- State: Mississippi
- County: Carroll
- Elevation: 302 ft (92 m)
- Time zone: UTC-6 (Central (CST))
  - Summer (DST): UTC-5 (CDT)
- ZIP code: 38917
- Area code: 662
- GNIS feature ID: 684933

Valley Hill is an unincorporated community located in Carroll County, Mississippi, United States on U.S. Route 82, approximately 9 miles (14 km) east of Greenwood and approximately 9 miles (14 km) west of Carrollton.

Valley Hill is part of the Greenwood, Mississippi micropolitan area.

Valley Hill is located on the former Southern Railway.

A post office first began operation under the name Valley Hill in 1858.
