= Bill Canon =

American politician (1930–2018)

William Ward Canon (December 31, 1930 – July 28, 2018) was a veterinarian and politician from Vaiden, Mississippi who served in the U.S. Air Force and eventually settled in Columbus, Mississippi. He served in the Mississippi House of Representatives and Mississippi Senate.

He graduated from Vaiden High School in 1948 and then studied to be a veterinarian at Mississippi State University and Auburn University.

He was a Democrat. Jesse L. Canon Jr. was his brother.
