= Abiaca Creek =

- Location of mouth

Location
- Country: United States
- State: Mississippi
- Counties: Carroll, Leflore, Holmes

Physical characteristics
- Mouth
  - coordinates: 33°18′29″N 90°16′43″W

Abiaca Creek is a stream in Carroll, Leflore and Holmes counties in the U.S. state of Mississippi.

Abiaca is a name derived from the Choctaw language meaning "the side of a swamp or creek". Variant names are "Abaytche Creek", "Abiacha Creek", "Abyache Creek", "Abyatcch Creek", "Abyatchie Creek", and "Coila Abiache Creek".
