= Lafayette Joseph Lott =

American politician from Mississippi (1863–1952)

Member of the Mississippi House of Representatives from the Carroll County district
- In office 1916-1920

Personal details
- Born: March 6, 1863 Carroll County, Mississippi
- Died: July 20, 1952 (aged 89)
- Resting place: Grenada, Mississippi
- Party: Democrat
- Spouse: Sarah Holland (m. 1880)
- Children: 9

LaFayette Joseph Lott, also known as Joseph Lafayette Lott (March 6, 1863 – July 20, 1952), was a Democratic member of the Mississippi House of Representatives representing Carroll County from 1916 to 1920.

== Biography ==
LaFayette Joseph Lott was born on March 6, 1863, in Carroll County, Mississippi. His parents were James Lott and Margarette Jane (McDonald) Lott. He was of Scottish and Irish ancestry. He was a farmer and a Baptist minister. He married Sarah Holland on December 18, 1880, and they had nine children together. He was the Justice of the Peace in Carroll County from 1888 to 1891. From 1905 to 1910, he was the organizer of the local farmer's union. On November 7, 1915, he was elected to the Mississippi House of Representatives, representing Carroll County, as a Democrat. He died on July 20, 1952, and was buried in Calvary Baptist Cemetery near Grenada, Mississippi.
