= Black Hawk, Mississippi =

- Unincorporated community
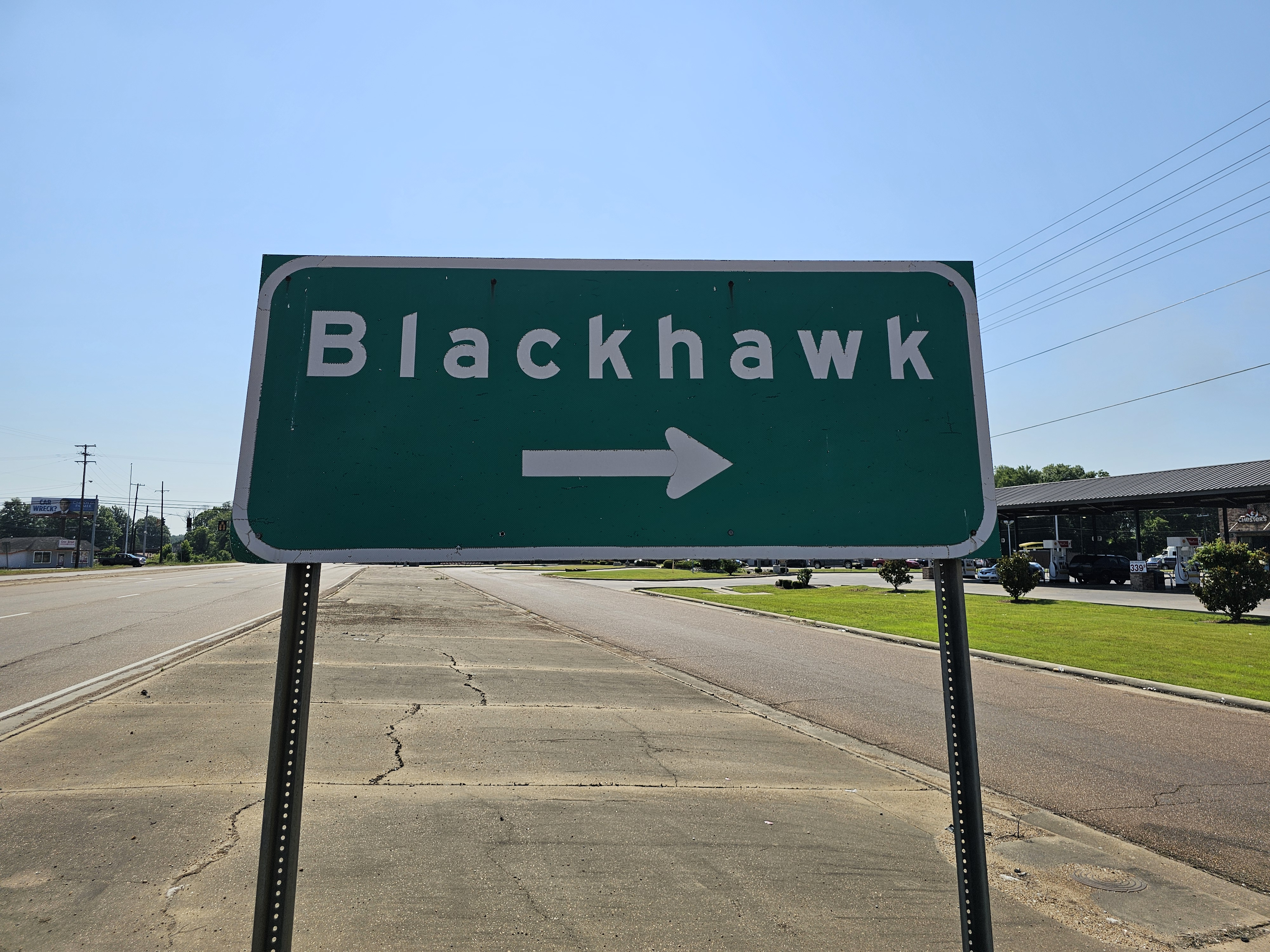
- Highway sign in Blackhawk located on US 82

- Location within Mississippi Location within the United States
- Coordinates: 33°19′34″N 90°01′25″W
- Country: United States
- State: Mississippi
- County: Carroll
- Elevation: 302 ft (92 m)
- Time zone: UTC-6 (Central (CST))
  - Summer (DST): UTC-5 (CDT)
- ZIP code: 38923
- Area code: 662
- GNIS feature ID: 667222

Black Hawk, also spelled Blackhawk, is an unincorporated community located in Carroll County, Mississippi, United States, approximately 20 miles (32 km) southeast of Greenwood on Mississippi Highway 430 and approximately 4 miles (6.4 km) north of Acona. Black Hawk is part of the Greenwood, Mississippi micropolitan area. Although unincorporated, Black Hawk has a postal code of 38923.

== History ==
Black Hawk is located on Abiaca Creek and was named for a Choctaw chief. Black Hawk was once home to an academy, grist mill, two churches, a carriage shop, and a branch of the Merchant's and Farmer's Bank of Lexington, Mississippi.

A post office operated under the name Black Hawk from 1837 to 1963 and under the name Black Hawk Rural Station from 1963 to 1973.

On March 24, 2023, an EF3 tornado devastated numerous homes and buildings in town.

== Climate ==
The climate in this area is characterized by hot, humid summers and generally mild to cool winters. According to the Köppen Climate Classification system, Black Hawk has a humid subtropical climate, abbreviated "Cfa" on climate maps.

== Education ==
Black Hawk is in the Carroll County School District, which operates Marshall Elementary School and J.Z. George High School. Prior to the 1999 consolidation of Vaiden High School into George High, a majority of the students at Vaiden were from Black Hawk, and a number of Black Hawk residents attended George.
