= McCarley, Mississippi =

- Unincorporated community
- Location within Mississippi Location within the United States
- Coordinates: 33°31′23″N 89°50′02″W
- Country: United States
- State: Mississippi
- County: Carroll
- Elevation: 282 ft (86 m)
- Time zone: UTC-6 (Central (CST))
  - Summer (DST): UTC-5 (CDT)
- ZIP code: 38943
- Area code: 662
- GNIS feature ID: 673294

McCarley is an unincorporated community located in Carroll County, Mississippi, United States, approximately 7 miles (11 km) west of Winona and approximately 5 miles (8.0 km) east of North Carrollton. McCarley is part of the Greenwood, Mississippi micropolitan area.

Although unincorporated, McCarley has a post office and a ZIP code of 38943.

McCarley is located on the former Southern Railway.

A post office first began operation under the name McCarley in 1890.
