= Teoc, Mississippi =

- Unincorporated community
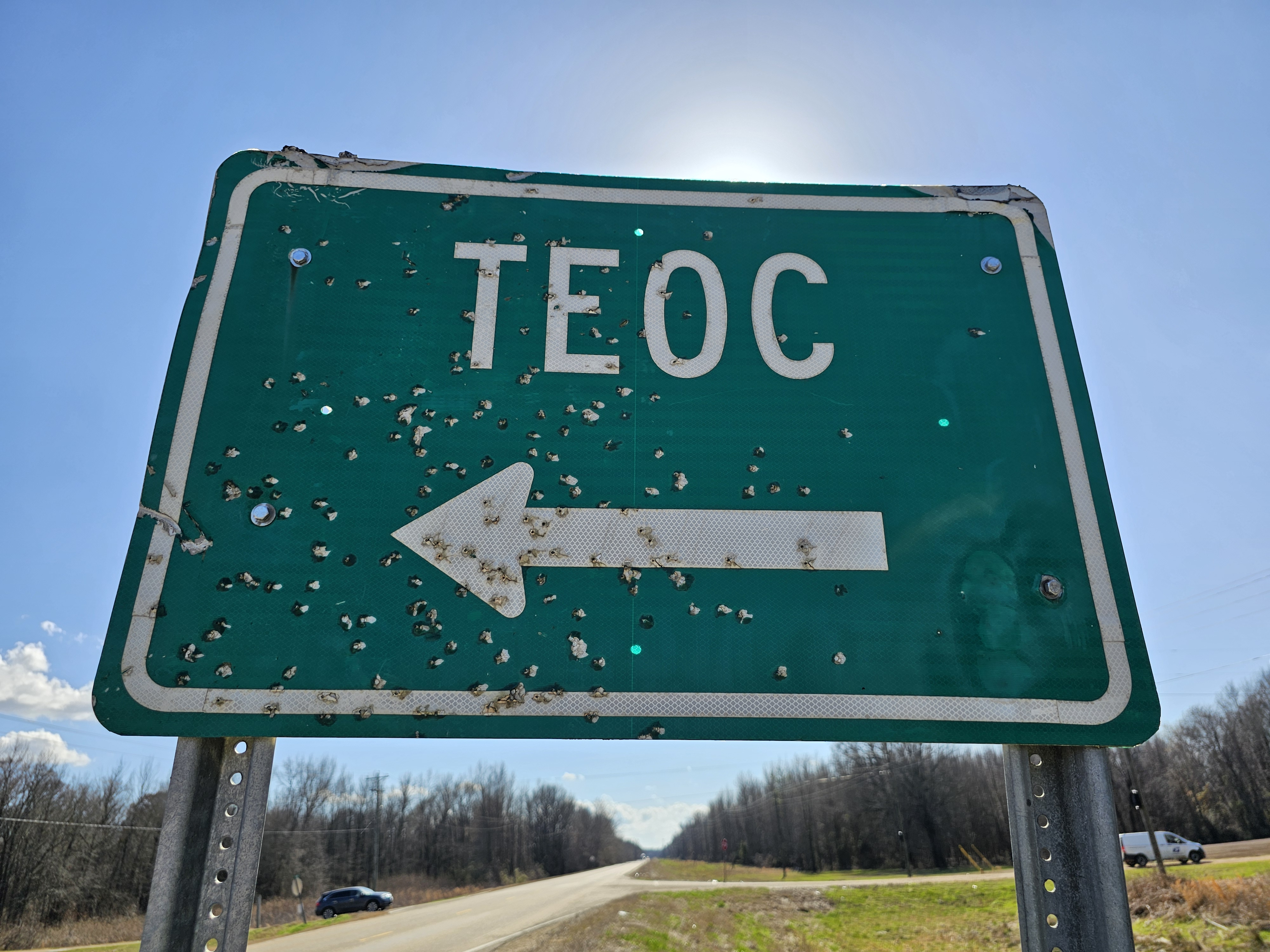
- Highway sign in Teoc located on Mississippi Highway 7

- Location within Mississippi Location within the United States
- Coordinates: 33°34′45″N 90°03′19″W
- Country: United States
- State: Mississippi
- County: Carroll
- Elevation: 151 ft (46 m)
- Time zone: UTC-6 (Central (CST))
  - Summer (DST): UTC-5 (CDT)
- GNIS feature ID: 692259

Teoc is an unincorporated community in Carroll County, Mississippi, United States and is part of the Greenwood, Mississippi micropolitan area, approximately 7 miles (11 km) northeast of Greenwood on Teoc Road along Teoc Creek.

== History ==
Located about eight miles northwest of North Carrollton, Teoc is probably the oldest settlement in Carroll County. The community takes its name from Teoc Creek.

A post office operated under the name Teoc from 1860 to 1907.

William Alexander McCain, great-great grandfather of Arizona former senator John McCain, purchased Teoc Plantation in 1851 and owned at least 52 slaves there. He died in 1863, fighting for the Confederacy during the American Civil War. Bill McCain, a descendant and cousin of Senator McCain, still owns 1500 of the plantation's former 2,000 acres (8.1 km^{2}). Since 2003, black and white descendants of the community at Teoc have attended family reunions organized by the black McCains, descended from two of the plantation's slaves, Isom and Lettie, and Henderson McCain. After the Civil War, the blacks remained closely entwined with Teoc, remaining as tenants of William Alexander's son, John Sidney McCain, and adopting the McCain surname. Black people surnamed McCain in Teoc, organizers of schooling for African-American children in the 1880s, were local leaders in the Civil Rights Movement of the 1960s.

== Notable people ==
- William Hemingway, mayor of Jackson, Mississippi from 1901 to 1905 and member of the Mississippi House of Representatives in 1920.
- Blues singer Mississippi John Hurt was born in Teoc.
- George Redditt, member of the Mississippi House of Representatives from 1916 to 1920
