= Greenwood micropolitan area, Mississippi =

Greenwood Micropolitan Area
- Micropolitan Statistical Area
- Greenwood, MS Micropolitan Statistical Area
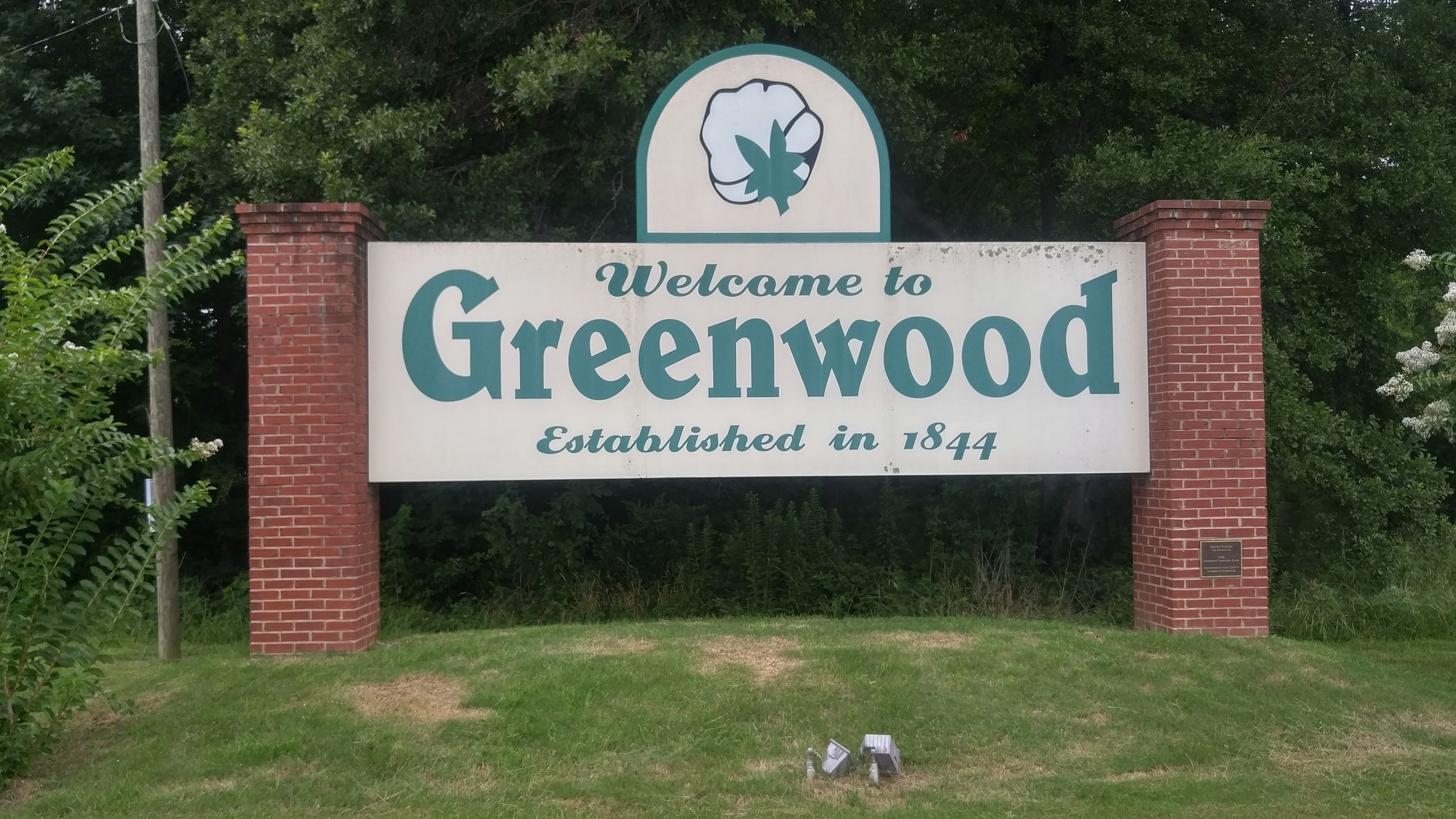
Interactive map of Greenwood, MS μSA
City of Greenwood
Greenwood, MS μSA
- Country: United States
- State: Mississippi
- Largest city: Greenwood
- Time zone: UTC−6 (CST)
  - Summer (DST): UTC−5 (CDT)

The Greenwood Micropolitan Statistical Area in the northwestern Delta region of Mississippi covers the two counties of Leflore and Carroll. As of the 2000 census, the micropolitan statistical area (μSA) had a population of 48,716 (though a July 1, 2009 estimate placed the population at 44,841).

== Counties ==
- Carroll
- Leflore

== Communities ==
=== Cities ===
- Greenwood (Principal City)
- Itta Bena

=== Towns ===
- Carrollton
- Morgan City
- North Carrollton
- Schlater
- Sidon
- Vaiden

=== Unincorporated places ===
- Avalon
- Black Hawk
- Coila
- McCarley
- Minter City
- Money
- Swiftown
- Teoc

== Demographics ==
As of the census of 2000, there were 48,716 people, 17,027 households, and 11,956 families residing within the μSA. The racial makeup of the μSA was 37.22% White, 60.85% African American, 0.10% Native American, 0.54% Asian, 0.03% Pacific Islander, 0.79% from other races, and 0.47% from two or more races. Hispanic or Latino of any race were 1.64% of the population.

The median income for a household in the μSA was $25,198, and the median income for a family was $30,885. Males had a median income of $27,209 versus $19,096 for females. The per capita income for the μSA was $14,149.

== See also ==
- List of metropolitan areas in Mississippi
- List of micropolitan areas in Mississippi
- List of cities in Mississippi
- List of towns and villages in Mississippi
- List of census-designated places in Mississippi
- List of United States metropolitan areas
