= Carroll Academy =

Segregation academy in Carrollton, Mississippi

Coordinates: 33.5109°N 89.9245°W

Carroll Academy (CA) is a private K-12 school in Carrollton, Mississippi. The Atlantic identified it as a segregation academy, a school created to thwart racial integration. In 2010 it had no African-American students.

The school was established in the ex-Jennie McBride School on August 28, 1969.

In 2011 the Southern Poverty Law Center (SPLC) stated that the Council of Conservative Citizens funds the school.

As of 2018 the school had 309 students, of which 305 were white and 4 were of two or more races.

== See also ==
- Carroll County School District – The public school system of the county
  - J. Z. George High School – Public high school
  - Vaiden High School – Former high school in Vaiden in Carroll County
