= Carroll County School District (Mississippi) =

School district in Mississippi

The Carroll County School District is a public school district based in Carrollton, Mississippi (USA). The district's boundaries parallel that of Carroll County. It is also known as Carroll County School District (CCSD).

== History ==
Before the year 1953, public education was not centralized in Carroll County, many schools were run and sustained by the community. There was an extensive network of rural schools catering specifically to the local's needs.

In 1953, Mississippi Legislature passed a law that reorganized and abolished more than 2,000 local school districts. The state education department was forced to reorganize these districts into more modern appropriate ones by July 1, 1957.

From 1957 to the 1990's, enrollment fell as the population declined due to agriculture became mechanized, and students were consolidated into few schools to make extra-curricular and academic programs easier to fund. This then lead to the merger of Vaiden High School and J.Z George High School in 1999.

Billy Joe Ferguson became the superintendent in 1996.

== Schools ==
- J. Z. George High School (North Carrollton)
- Marshall Elementary School (unincorporated area, adjacent to North Carrollton)

Former schools

- Vaiden High School (Vaiden) – Consolidated into J. Z. George HS in 1999
- Hathorne Elementary School (Vaiden) In 2006 Hathorne Elementary had 141 students and 21 employees. That year the district leadership proposed closing the school, something criticized by George Tubreville, mayor of Vaiden. The consolidation of Vaiden High and a decline in enrollment at Hathorne contributed to the district deciding to close the elementary school. Hathorne Elementary closed in 2010 and the district stopped using the building. In 2014 Central Mississippi Inc., intending to establish a Head Start program, bought the school for $136,000.

== Operations ==
In 2006 the district had a higher per student spending compared to the Mississippi state average.

== Demographics ==
=== 2006-07 school year ===
There were a total of 982 students enrolled in the Carroll County School District during the 2006–2007 school year. The gender makeup of the district was 49% female and 51% male. The racial makeup of the district was 70.98% African American, 28.41% White, and 0.61% Hispanic. 76.5% of the district's students were eligible to receive free lunch.

=== Previous school years ===
School Year	Enrollment	Gender Makeup		Racial Makeup				
School Year	Enrollment	Female	Male	Asian	African American	Hispanic	Native American	White
2005-06	1,035	49%	51%	–	72.37%	0.48%	0.10%	27.05%
2004-05	1,067	49%	51%	–	72.07%	0.19%	–	27.74%
2003-04	1,109	49%	51%	0.09%	70.51%	0.18%	–	29.21%
2002-03	1,150	48%	52%	0.09%	71.48%	–	–	28.43%

== Accountability statistics ==
	2006-07	2005-06	2004-05	2003-04	2002-03
District Accreditation Status	Accredited	Accredited	Accredited	Accredited	Accredited
School Performance Classifications
Level 5 (Superior Performing) Schools	0	0	0	0	0
Level 4 (Exemplary) Schools	1	1	1	1	1
Level 3 (Successful) Schools	2	1	2	2	2
Level 2 (Under Performing) Schools	0	1	0	0	0
Level 1 (Low Performing) Schools	0	0	0	0	0
Not Assigned	0	0	0	0	0

== See also ==
- List of school districts in Mississippi
- Carroll Academy – Private school in Carrollton, Mississippi
