= French Site (22HO565) =

- U.S. National Register of Historic Places
- Nearest city: Cruger, Mississippi
- Area: 80 acres (32 ha)
- NRHP reference No.: 86002328
- Added to NRHP: November 6, 1986

The French Site (22HO565) is an archeological site in Carroll County, Mississippi and Holmes County, Mississippi. It was listed on the National Register of Historic Places in 1986.

It is Address restricted.
