= Oklahoma, Mississippi =

- Unincorporated community
- Location within Mississippi Location within the United States
- Coordinates: 33°20′01″N 90°10′06″W
- Country: United States
- State: Mississippi
- County: Carroll
- Elevation: 138 ft (42 m)
- Time zone: UTC-6 (Central (CST))
  - Summer (DST): UTC-5 (CDT)
- Area code: 662
- GNIS feature ID: 675153

Oklahoma is an unincorporated community in Carroll County, Mississippi, United States.

== History ==
The community's name may be a direct transfer from the state of Oklahoma. Oklahoma is a name ultimately derived from the Choctaw language meaning "Red People".
