= Vaiden High School =

Public school in Mississippi, United States

Vaiden High School was a public middle and high school in Vaiden, Mississippi. It was a part of the Carroll County School District

It occupies a 10-acre (4.0 ha) property, and is in a 28,252-square-foot (2,624.7 m^{2}) three story classroom building.

== History ==
Prior to 1941, grades 1-12 occupied three buildings made of wood. Its current building, then for grades 1–12, opened in 1941 in the same plot which once held the wooden buildings, making it the first 1-12 consolidated school in southern Carroll County.

Theresa Vigour of The Conservative stated that Vaiden "is one of the smallest [schools] in the state." Circa 1996 officials from the Mississippi Department of Education had discussed requiring small schools to consolidate, something that, along with the expense of renovating schools to add technology, prompted Carroll County school district officials to seek consolidation. In 1999 Vaiden High consolidated into J. Z. George High School in North Carrollton. The district used teacher evaluations to determine which teachers got jobs at the consolidated Vaiden High, with seniority used as a tiebreaker. Teachers who were not placed at the new J. Z. George worked at other schools or retired.

The Vaiden city government paid $2 in June 2002 to buy much of the Vaiden High property, including a double wide trailer that was once used as a cafeteria, the agricultural classes building, and the home economics building. The school district retained the gymnasium as students at J. Z. George use it for athletic activities. In 2003 the Mayor of Vaiden, George Turbeville, stated that he wanted to institute supplementary educational programs.

In 2003 Mississippi state authorities declared it a historic landmark.

At one time Billy Joe Ferguson, who later became superintendent of Carroll County schools, was principal at Vaiden High. Shirley Frizell was the final principal of the school.

In early April 1988, the gymnasium was used to house production wardrobe, hairstyling and makeup for extras performing in Mississippi Burning, for courtroom and sheriff's office scenes filmed in the old Carroll County Courthouse nearby (demolished a few years later) and for scenes of a funeral procession down Mulberry Street in front of the offscreen courthouse.

== Curriculum ==
The overall curriculum in Carroll County High Schools was applied to both Vaiden and George highs. In 1999 the school offered one foreign language, Spanish.

== Athletics ==
In 1972 the school terminated its American football team. The school gained prowess in basketball, and it went to the Mississippi state tournament in 1999. Ferris Jenkins, athletic coach of the district, stated in 1999 that "Vaiden's always had good basketball" and that "Vaiden's always had good athletes."

== Alumni ==
- Bill Canon, veterinarian and state legislator who served in the U.S. Air Force

== See also ==
- Carroll Academy – Private school in Carrollton, Mississippi
