= Vaiden, Mississippi =

- Town
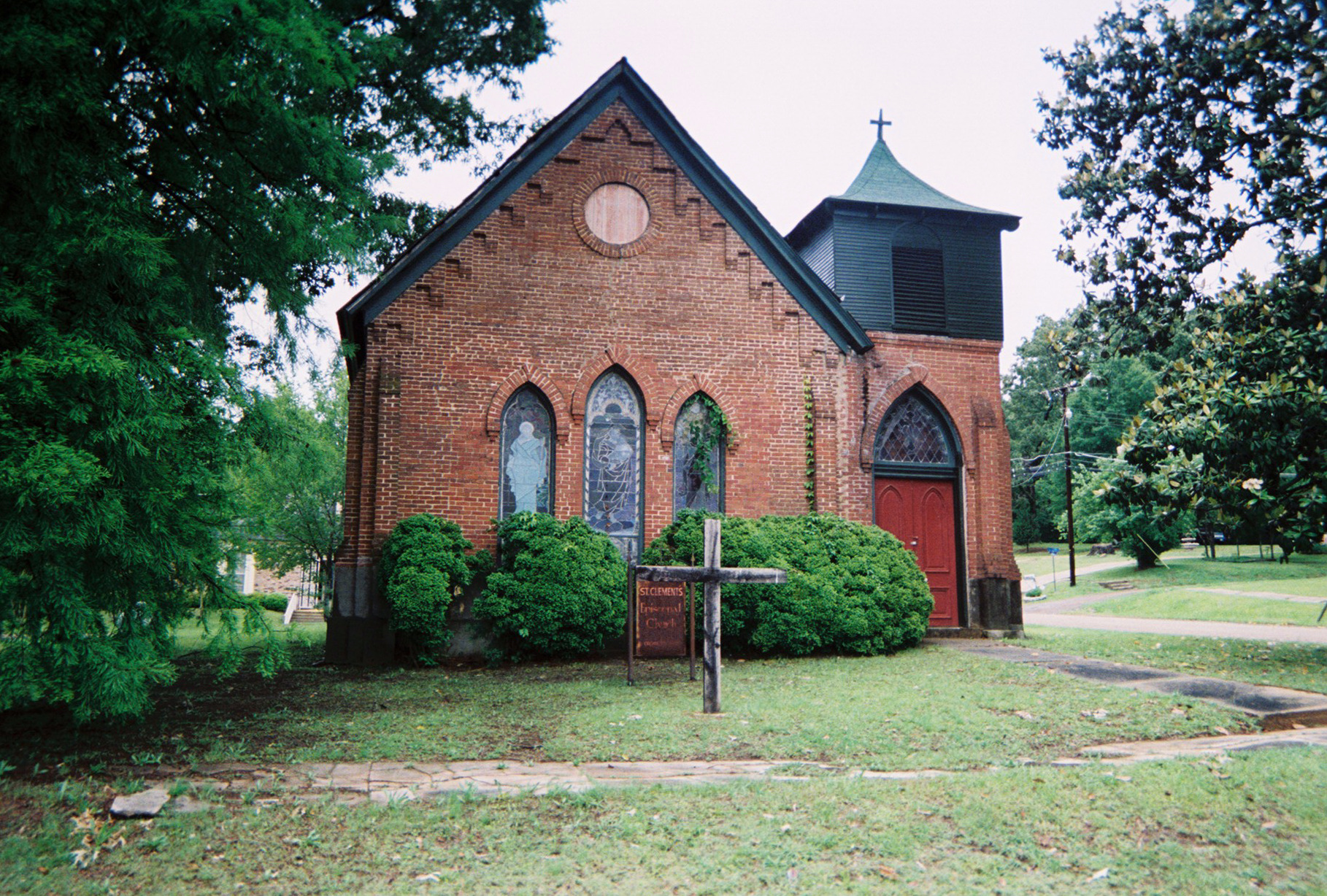
- St. Clement's Episcopal Church, Vaiden, organized 1859

- Location of Vaiden, Mississippi
- Coordinates: 33°19′54″N 89°44′49″W
- Country: United States
- State: Mississippi
- County: Carroll

Area
  - Total: 2.15 sq mi (5.56 km^{2})
  - Land: 2.15 sq mi (5.56 km^{2})
  - Water: 0.0039 sq mi (0.01 km^{2})
- Elevation: 312 ft (95 m)

Population (2020)
  - Total: 907
  - Density: 422.8/sq mi (163.24/km^{2})
- Time zone: UTC-6 (Central (CST))
  - Summer (DST): UTC-5 (CDT)
- ZIP code: 39176
- Area code: 662
- FIPS code: 28-75880
- GNIS feature ID: 0679166
- Website: www.vaidenms.gov

Vaiden is a town in Carroll County, Mississippi, United States and its first county seat. As of the 2020 census, Vaiden had a population of 907. It is part of the Greenwood, Mississippi micropolitan area.

== History ==
Vaiden was founded circa 1857 and named after Dr. Cowles Mead Vaiden (April 21, 1812 - February 6, 1880), a local doctor, planter and philanthropist. In the late 1850s, Dr. Vaiden gave the right-of-way through his land for construction of the last span of the Central Railroad, in order to connect the state capital, Jackson, with Memphis, Tennessee. At about the railroad's completion in 1857, the population that had settled at the former Choctaw Indian town of Shongalo was moved to the east, to allow for better access to the railroad.

The new town was named in honor of Dr. Vaiden, and was made a regular stop on the railroad line. For that reason, it was designated as the county seat of Carroll County. Vaiden was incorporated on February 10, 1860. With additional development of population in the county, residents wanted to have access to a town closer to the Mississippi River. Carrollton was also designated as a county seat and is the site of the county courthouse.

== Geography ==
U.S. Route 51 passes through the center of town.

According to the United States Census Bureau, Vaiden has a total area of 2.2 square miles (5.6 km^{2}), all land.

== Demographics ==
Historical population
Census	Pop.	Note	%±
1880	526		—
1890	533		1.3%
1900	474		−11.1%
1910	713		50.4%
1920	579		−18.8%
1930	648		11.9%
1940	601		−7.3%
1950	583		−3.0%
1960	475		−18.5%
1970	716		50.7%
1980	924		29.1%
1990	789		−14.6%
2000	840		6.5%
2010	734		−12.6%
2020	907		23.6%
U.S. Decennial Census

=== Racial and ethnic composition ===
Vaiden town, Mississippi – Racial and ethnic composition Note: the US Census treats Hispanic/Latino as an ethnic category. This table excludes Latinos from the racial categories and assigns them to a separate category. Hispanics/Latinos may be of any race.
Race / Ethnicity (NH = Non-Hispanic)	Pop 2000	Pop 2010	Pop 2020	% 2000	% 2010	% 2020
White alone (NH)	235	239	292	27.98%	32.56%	32.19%
Black or African American alone (NH)	596	477	560	70.95%	64.99%	61.74%
Native American or Alaska Native alone (NH)	0	1	6	0.00%	0.14%	0.66%
Asian alone (NH)	1	0	2	0.12%	0.00%	0.22%
Native Hawaiian or Pacific Islander alone (NH)	0	0	0	0.00%	0.00%	0.00%
Other race alone (NH)	0	0	0	0.00%	0.00%	0.00%
Mixed race or Multiracial (NH)	1	13	22	0.12%	1.77%	2.43%
Hispanic or Latino (any race)	7	4	25	0.83%	0.54%	2.76%
Total	840	734	907	100.00%	100.00%	100.00%

=== 2020 census ===
As of the 2020 United States census, there were 907 people, 217 households, and 112 families residing in the town.

=== 2000 census ===
According to the 2000 census, there were 840 people, 326 households, and 202 families residing in the town. The population density was 383.8 inhabitants per square mile (148.2/km^{2}). There were 365 housing units at an average density of 166.8 per square mile (64.4/km^{2}). The racial makeup of the town was 28.45% White, 71.07% African American, 0.12% Native American, 0.12% Asian, 0.12% from other races, and 0.12% from two or more races. Hispanic or Latino of any race were 0.83% of the population.

There were 326 households, out of which 30.7% had children under the age of 18 living with them, 31.0% were married couples living together, 26.7% had a female householder with no husband present, and 38.0% were non-families. 34.4% of all households were made up of individuals, and 16.0% had someone living alone who was 65 years of age or older. The average household size was 2.31 and the average family size was 2.97.

In the town, the population was spread out, with 24.0% under the age of 18, 13.9% from 18 to 24, 29.5% from 25 to 44, 20.5% from 45 to 64, and 12.0% who were 65 years of age or older. The median age was 34 years. For every 100 females, there were 108.4 males. For every 100 females age 18 and over, there were 111.3 males.

The median income for a household in the town was $15,000 and the median income for a family was $26,944. Males had a median income of $26,607 versus $15,500 for females. The per capita income for the town was $17,158. About 26.2% of families and 32.9% of the population were below the poverty line, including 32.9% of those under age 18 and 38.6% of those age 65 or over.

== Education ==
The town of Vaiden is served by the Carroll County School District. Its schools are Marshall Elementary School and J. Z. George High School in North Carrollton.

The town previously hosted Hathorne Elementary School and Vaiden High School. Vaiden High consolidated into George in 1999.

In 2006 Hathorne Elementary had 141 students and 21 employees. That year the district leadership proposed closing the school, an action criticized by George Tubreville, mayor of Vaiden. The consolidation of Vaiden High and a decline in enrollment at Hathorne contributed to the district deciding to close the elementary school. Hathorne Elementary closed in 2010 and the district stopped using the building. In 2014 Central Mississippi Inc., intending to establish a Head Start program, bought the school for $136,000.

== Notable people ==
- Earl L. Brewer, governor of Mississippi from 1912 to 1916
- Verell Ferguson, member of the Mississippi House of Representatives from 1912 to 1923
- Walter Holman, former NFL player
- Clarence Pierce, member of the Mississippi House of Representatives from 1952 to 1984
