= J. Z. George High School =

School in Vaiden, Mississippi

Coordinates: 33.5206°N 89.9206°W

- 900 George St; North Carrollton, Mississippi; United States

Information
- Type: Middle and High school
- Established: 1962
- School district: Carroll County School District
- Oversight: Carroll County School District
- Principal: Nathan Moncrief; Kevin Jones (assistant)
- Teaching staff: 31.25 (FTE)
- Grades: 7-12
- Gender: Coeducational
- Enrollment: 366 (2023-2024)
- Student to teacher ratio: 11.71
- Colors: Maroon and white
- Mascot: Jaguars
- Website: msjzgeorgehs.schoolinsites.com

J. Z. George High School is a public middle and high school in North Carrollton, Mississippi. It is a part of the Carroll County School District. It is named after lawyer, secessionist and Confederate officer James Z. George who as a state senator was a proponent of disenfranchising African Americans. The current principal is Nathan Moncrief. He succeeded Coretta Green. In 2022 the student body was 55 percent black, 38 percent white and 5 percent Hispanic with 99 percent of students classified as economically disadvantaged.

== History ==
In 1999 Shirley Lester was the principal. That year there were 307 students, with a portion of them from Black Hawk.

In 1999 Vaiden High School in Vaiden consolidated into J. Z. George. The new mascot of the combined school is the Jaguar. The projected consolidated enrollment was 447. In January 1999, to prepare for consolidation, the district began adding seven classrooms, five science laboratories, and other expansion, as well as renovation, totaling $3.5 million. The district used teacher evaluations to determine which teachers got jobs at the consolidated Vaiden High, with seniority used as a tiebreaker. Teachers who were not placed at the new J. Z. George worked at other schools or retired.

In 2019 the State of Mississippi gave the school a "D" ranking because the district computed the scores as if it were one school instead of giving the scores separately for middle and high school divisions. Therefore the high school alone would have been a "C" but was given a "D" ranking inherited from the sum score. The district itself, rather than the state, made the error, so the district was not able to appeal the "D" score. Also the graduation score was incorrect because students who left J. Z. George to be in the New Resource Learning Center (NRLC) and then returned to J. Z. George upon completing NRLC were not counted as being graduates of J. Z. George.

== Curriculum ==
As of 1999 the school was to offer both Spanish and French.

In 1988 the school added a business mathematics course.

The school has a parenting simulation program called "Baby Think it Over" to illustrate to students the demands of parenting.

== Athletics ==
Prior to 1999 it was in league 1A, but due to the consolidation it was to move up to 2A.

Since 2006 the county granted permission for J. Z. George's baseball team to play on county land in North Carrollton. Prior to that point the team did not have a regular ball field.

== Alumni ==
- Willie Totten college football coach and MVSU College Football Hall of Fame quarterback who was teammates with Jerry Rice

== See also ==
- Carroll County School District – The public school system of the county
