= Carrollton, Mississippi =

- Town
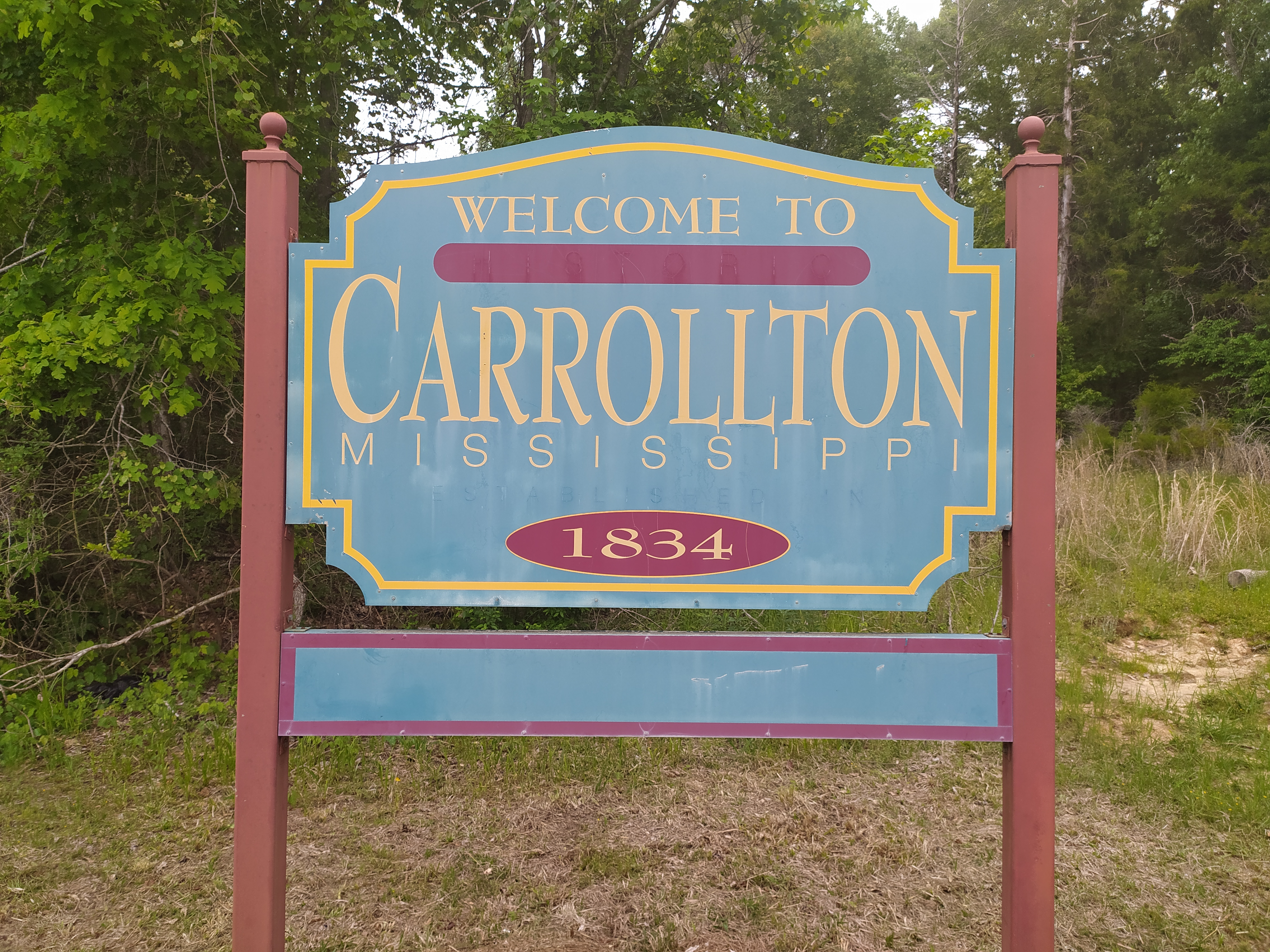
- Welcome sign located on US Highway 82 West in Carrollton

- Location of Carrollton, Mississippi
- Coordinates: 33°30′18″N 89°55′22″W
- Country: United States
- State: Mississippi
- County: Carroll

Area
  - Total: 0.81 sq mi (2.11 km^{2})
  - Land: 0.81 sq mi (2.11 km^{2})
  - Water: 0 sq mi (0.00 km^{2})
- Elevation: 289 ft (88 m)

Population (2020)
  - Total: 423
  - Density: 520.4/sq mi (200.92/km^{2})
- Time zone: UTC-6 (Central (CST))
  - Summer (DST): UTC-5 (CDT)
- ZIP code: 38917
- Area code: 662
- FIPS code: 28-11580
- GNIS feature ID: 0668097
- Website: carrolltonms.net

Carrollton is a town in and the second county seat of Carroll County, Mississippi, United States, which is within the Mississippi Delta. As of the 2020 census, Carrollton had a population of 423. Centrally located in the county, the town is part of the Greenwood, Mississippi micropolitan area. The second county seat, Vaiden, was founded in the south eastern part of the county during its early settlement.

== History ==
The town was developed as the county seat and trading center for rural Carroll County, which was devoted to cotton agriculture and plantations in the antebellum era.

The town was the location of the Carroll County Courthouse Massacre, in 1886.

== Geography ==
Carrollton is located in central Carroll County on the south side of Big Sand Creek, a tributary of the Yalobusha River. According to the United States Census Bureau, Carrollton has a total area of 0.8 square miles (2.1 km^{2}), all land.

The town borders North Carrollton, which is located directly to the north across the creek. Mississippi Highways 17 and 35 pass through the center of Carrollton, leading north into North Carrollton. Many residents of Carrollton and North Carrollton consider the towns a single entity, simply referred to as Carrollton.

Highway 35 continues north 21 miles (34 km) to Holcomb; in the other direction, it leads southeast 18 miles (29 km) to Vaiden, the other county seat. Highway 17 leads south 30 miles (48 km) to Lexington. U.S. Route 82, a four-lane divided highway, passes through the southern part of Carrollton, leading east 11 miles (18 km) to Winona and west 18 miles (29 km) to Greenwood.

=== Climate ===
The climate in this area is characterized by hot, humid summers and generally mild to cool winters. According to the Köppen Climate Classification system, Carrollton has a humid subtropical climate, abbreviated "Cfa" on climate maps.

== Demographics ==
Historical population
Census	Pop.	Note	%±
1860	718		—
1870	377		−47.5%
1880	394		4.5%
1890	488		23.9%
1900	540		10.7%
1910	608		12.6%
1920	510		−16.1%
1930	523		2.5%
1940	575		9.9%
1950	475		−17.4%
1960	343		−27.8%
1970	295		−14.0%
1980	338		14.6%
1990	221		−34.6%
2000	408		84.6%
2010	190		−53.4%
2020	423		122.6%
U.S. Decennial Census

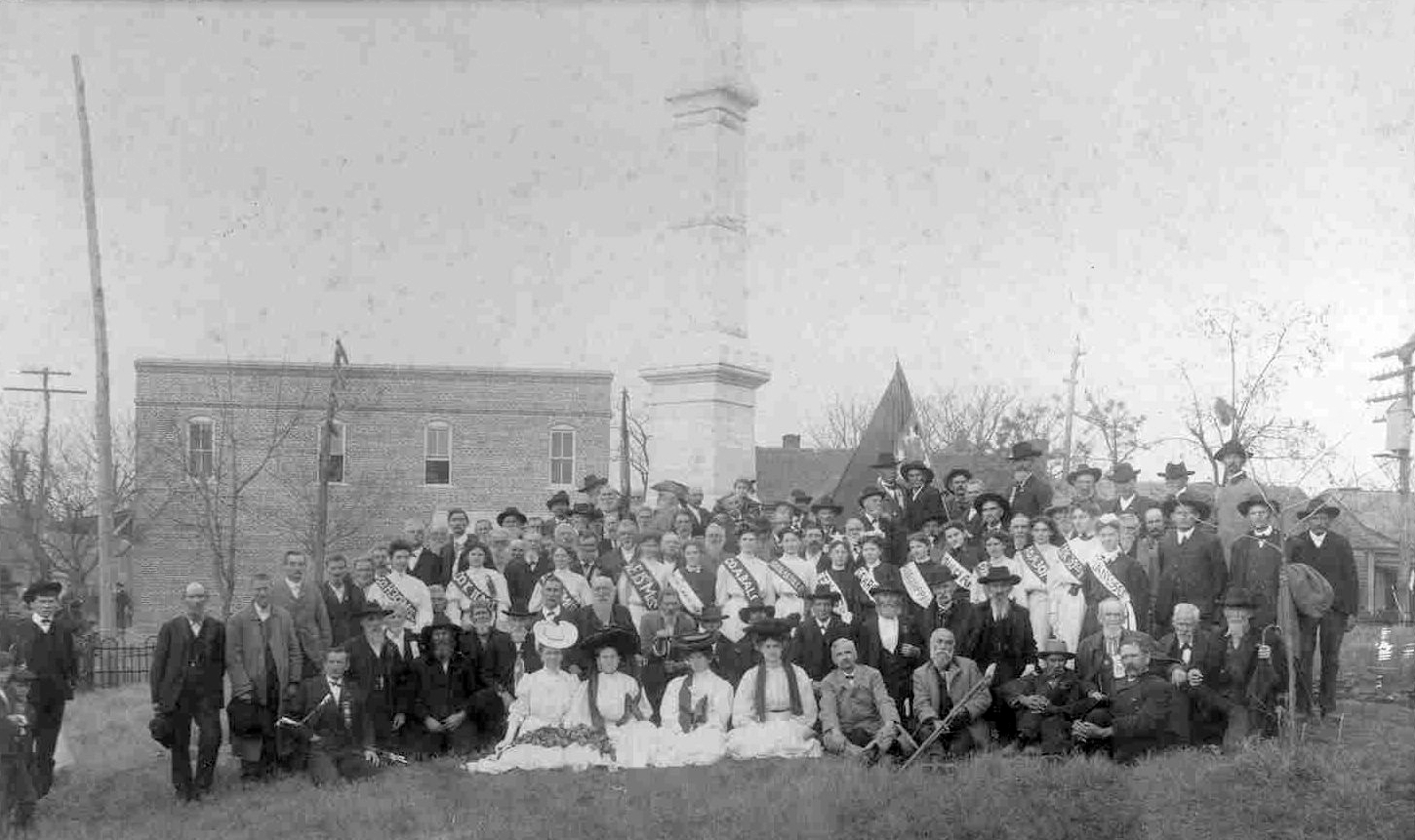
Unveiling of Confederate monument in Carrollton, 1905

=== 2020 census ===
Carrollton racial composition (NH = Non-Hispanic) (Note: Note: the US Census treats Hispanic/Latino as an ethnic category. This table excludes Latinos from the racial categories and assigns them to a separate category. Hispanics/Latinos can be of any race.)
Race	Number	Percentage
White (NH)	293	69.27%
Black or African American (NH)	108	25.53%
Native American or Alaska Native (NH)	1	0.24%
Mixed/Multi-Racial (NH)	6	1.42%
Hispanic or Latino	15	3.55%
Total	423	

As of the 2020 United States census, there were 423 people, 73 households, and 43 families residing in the town.

=== 2000 census ===
As of the census of 2000, there were 408 people, 85 households, and 62 families residing in the town. The population density was 522.0 inhabitants per square mile (201.5/km^{2}). There were 99 housing units at an average density of 126.7 per square mile (48.9/km^{2}). The racial makeup of the town was 50.00% White and 50.00% African American. Hispanic or Latino of any race were 0.49% of the population.

There were 85 households, out of which 24.7% had children under the age of 18 living with them, 57.6% were married couples living together, 10.6% had a female householder with no husband present, and 25.9% were non-families. 24.7% of all households were made up of individuals, and 17.6% had someone living alone who was 65 years of age or older. The average household size was 2.27 and the average family size was 2.65.

In the town, the population was spread out, with 8.3% under the age of 18, 27.9% from 18 to 24, 34.3% from 25 to 44, 18.1% from 45 to 64, and 11.3% who were 65 years of age or older. The median age was 31 years. For every 100 females, there were 312.1 males. For every 100 females age 18 and over, there were 340.0 males.

The median income for a household in the town was $48,750, and the median income for a family was $53,333. Males had a median income of $21,667 versus $23,750 for females. The per capita income for the town was $13,536. About 6.9% of families and 6.5% of the population were below the poverty line, including 8.3% of those under age 18 and 10.6% of those age 65 or over.

== Education ==
The town of Carrollton is served by the Carroll County School District. Its schools are Marshall Elementary School and J. Z. George High School in North Carrollton.

It is also served by Carroll Academy, a private school in Carrollton.

== Notable people ==
- Benajah Harvey Carroll, Baptist pastor, theologian, teacher, and author
- G. L. Crockett, R&B singer
- Basil LeFlore, Governor of the Choctaw nation
- Robert LeFlore, 11-term Illinois state legislator
- William A. McCain, US Army brigadier general
- Billy Nichols, musician
- Willie Norwood, professional basketball player
- John A. Pittman, Korean War hero
- Elizabeth Spencer, writer
