= North Carrollton, Mississippi =

- Town
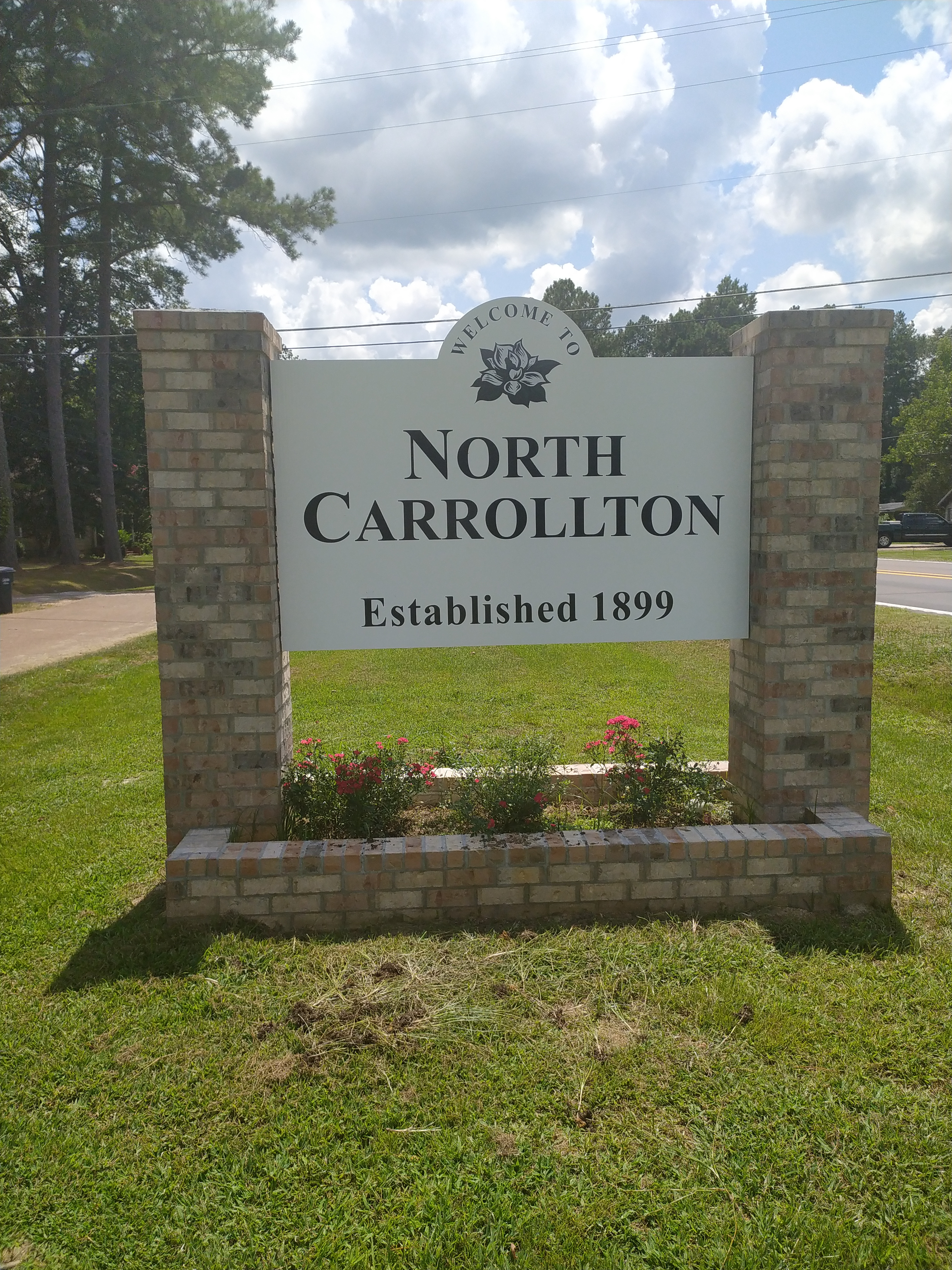
- Welcome sign in North Carrollton

- Flag

- Location of North Carrollton, Mississippi
- Coordinates: 33°31′5″N 89°55′12″W
- Country: United States
- State: Mississippi
- County: Carroll

Area
  - Total: 0.32 sq mi (0.82 km^{2})
  - Land: 0.32 sq mi (0.82 km^{2})
  - Water: 0 sq mi (0.00 km^{2})
- Elevation: 226 ft (69 m)

Population (2020)
  - Total: 405
  - Density: 1,286/sq mi (496.4/km^{2})
- Time zone: UTC-6 (Central (CST))
  - Summer (DST): UTC-5 (CDT)
- ZIP code: 38947
- Area code: 662
- FIPS code: 28-52400
- GNIS feature ID: 0674946
- Website: www.northcarrolltonms.us

North Carrollton is a town in Carroll County, Mississippi, United States. As of the 2020 census, North Carrollton had a population of 405. It is part of the Greenwood, Mississippi micropolitan area.

== Geography ==
North Carrollton is bordered to the south by the town of Carrollton, the county seat. The two towns are separated by Big Sand Creek, a tributary of the Yalobusha River. Many residents of Carrollton and North Carrollton consider the towns a single entity, simply referred to as Carrollton.

According to the United States Census Bureau, the town has a total area of 0.31 square miles (0.8 km^{2}), all land.

== Demographics ==
Historical population
Census	Pop.	Note	%±
1900	189		—
1910	302		59.8%
1920	363		20.2%
1930	394		8.5%
1940	469		19.0%
1950	506		7.9%
1960	521		3.0%
1970	611		17.3%
1980	859		40.6%
1990	578		−32.7%
2000	499		−13.7%
2010	473		−5.2%
2020	405		−14.4%
U.S. Decennial Census

=== 2020 census ===
North Carrollton racial composition (NH = Non-Hispanic) (Note: Note: the US Census treats Hispanic/Latino as an ethnic category. This table excludes Latinos from the racial categories and assigns them to a separate category. Hispanics/Latinos can be of any race.)
Race	Number	Percentage
White (NH)	244	60.25%
Black or African American (NH)	145	35.8%
Asian (NH)	1	0.25%
Some Other Race (NH)	1	0.25%
Mixed/Multi-Racial (NH)	8	1.98%
Hispanic or Latino	6	1.48%
Total	405	

As of the 2020 United States census, there were 405 people, 170 households, and 76 families residing in the town.

=== 2000 census ===
As of the census of 2000, there were 499 people, 226 households, and 153 families residing in the town. The population density was 1,599.3 inhabitants per square mile (617.5/km^{2}). There were 253 housing units at an average density of 810.9 per square mile (313.1/km^{2}). The racial makeup of the town was 56.51% White, 42.89% African American, and 0.60% from two or more races. Hispanic or Latino of any race were 0.80% of the population.

There were 226 households, out of which 29.6% had children under the age of 18 living with them, 41.6% were married couples living together, 22.1% had a female householder with no husband present, and 31.9% were non-families. 31.0% of all households were made up of individuals, and 19.5% had someone living alone who was 65 years of age or older. The average household size was 2.21 and the average family size was 2.71.

In the town, the population was spread out, with 22.8% under the age of 18, 11.2% from 18 to 24, 23.6% from 25 to 44, 20.4% from 45 to 64, and 21.8% who were 65 years of age or older. The median age was 38 years. For every 100 females, there were 79.5 males. For every 100 females age 18 and over, there were 69.6 males.

The median income for a household in the town was $19,659, and the median income for a family was $23,333. Males had a median income of $24,688 versus $17,361 for females. The per capita income for the town was $11,454. About 28.0% of families and 33.5% of the population were below the poverty line, including 52.0% of those under age 18 and 30.5% of those age 65 or over.

== Education ==
The town of North Carrollton is served by the Carroll County School District. Its schools are Marshall Elementary School and J. Z. George High School.

It is also served by Carroll Academy, a private school in Carrollton.
