= Carroll County, Mississippi =

County in Mississippi, United States

- County
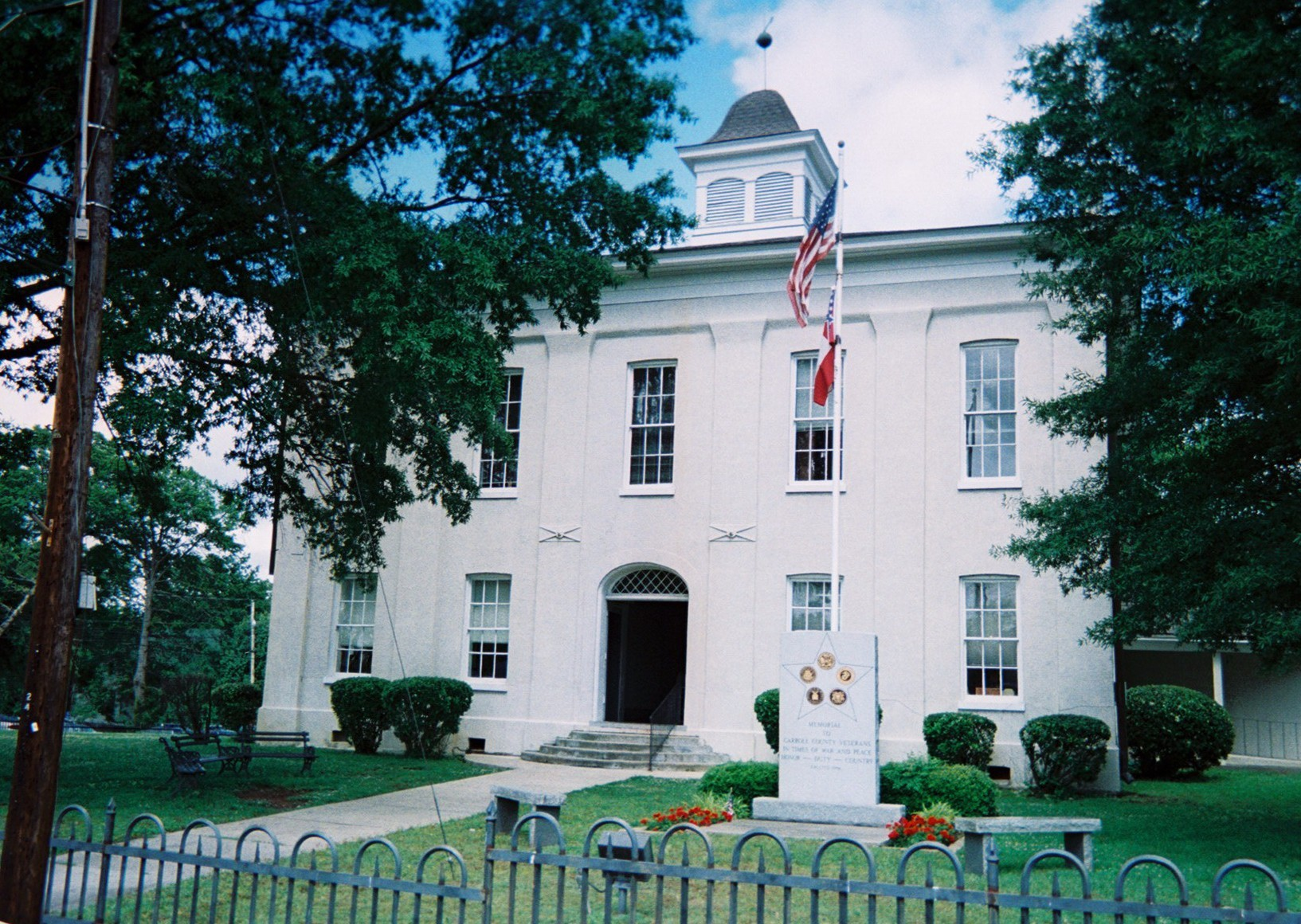
- Carroll County Courthouse

- Location within the U.S. state of Mississippi
- Coordinates: 33°27′N 89°55′W
- Country: United States
- State: Mississippi
- Founded: 1833
- Named for: Charles Carroll of Carrollton
- Seat: Carrollton (Northern District); Vaiden (Southern District)
- Largest town: Vaiden

Area
  - Total: 635 sq mi (1,640 km^{2})
  - Land: 628 sq mi (1,630 km^{2})
  - Water: 6.3 sq mi (16 km^{2}) 1.0%

Population (2020)
  - Total: 9,998
  - Estimate (2025): 9,226 ▼
  - Density: 15.9/sq mi (6.15/km^{2})
- Time zone: UTC−6 (Central)
  - Summer (DST): UTC−5 (CDT)
- Congressional district: 2nd
- Website: www.carrollcountyms.net

Carroll County is a county in the U.S. state of Mississippi. As of the 2020 census, the population was 9,998. Its county seats are Carrollton and Vaiden. The county is named for Charles Carroll of Carrollton, the last surviving signatory of the Declaration of Independence.

Carroll County is part of the Greenwood, Micropolitan Statistical Area. Bordered by the Yazoo River on the west and the Big Black River to the east, it is considered to lie within the Mississippi Delta region. Most of its land, however, is in the hill country.

The county is referred to in the third verse of Bobbie Gentry's 1967 hit song, "Ode to Billie Joe".

== History ==
This area was developed by European Americans for cotton plantations near the rivers. These were dependent on the labor of large gangs of enslaved African Americans. After the American Civil War, many freedmen worked as sharecroppers or tenant farmers on the plantations. Other areas were harvested for timber.

In the period from 1877 to 1950, Carroll County had 29 documented lynchings of African Americans, the second-highest number in the state.

== Geography ==
Carroll County consists of rolling hills, largely covered with trees. The county's highest point is adjacent to State Highway 35, 8 miles (13 km) WSW of Winona, at 540 ft (160 m) ASL. According to the Census Bureau, the county has a total area of 635 square miles (1,640 km^{2}), of which 628 square miles (1,630 km^{2}) is land and 6.3 square miles (16 km^{2}) (1.0%) is water.

=== Major highways ===
- Interstate 55
- U.S. Route 51
- U.S. Route 82
- Mississippi Highway 17
- Mississippi Highway 35

=== Adjacent counties ===
- Grenada County - north
- Montgomery County - east
- Attala County - southeast
- Holmes County - southwest
- Leflore County - west

== Demographics ==
Historical population
Census	Pop.	Note	%±
1840	10,481		—
1850	18,491		76.4%
1860	22,035		19.2%
1870	21,047		−4.5%
1880	17,795		−15.5%
1890	18,773		5.5%
1900	22,116		17.8%
1910	23,139		4.6%
1920	20,324		−12.2%
1930	19,765		−2.8%
1940	20,651		4.5%
1950	15,499		−24.9%
1960	11,177		−27.9%
1970	9,397		−15.9%
1980	9,776		4.0%
1990	9,237		−5.5%
2000	10,769		16.6%
2010	10,597		−1.6%
2020	9,998		−5.7%
2025 (est.)	9,226	▼	−7.7%
US Decennial Census; 1790-1960 1900-1990; 1990-2000 2010-2013

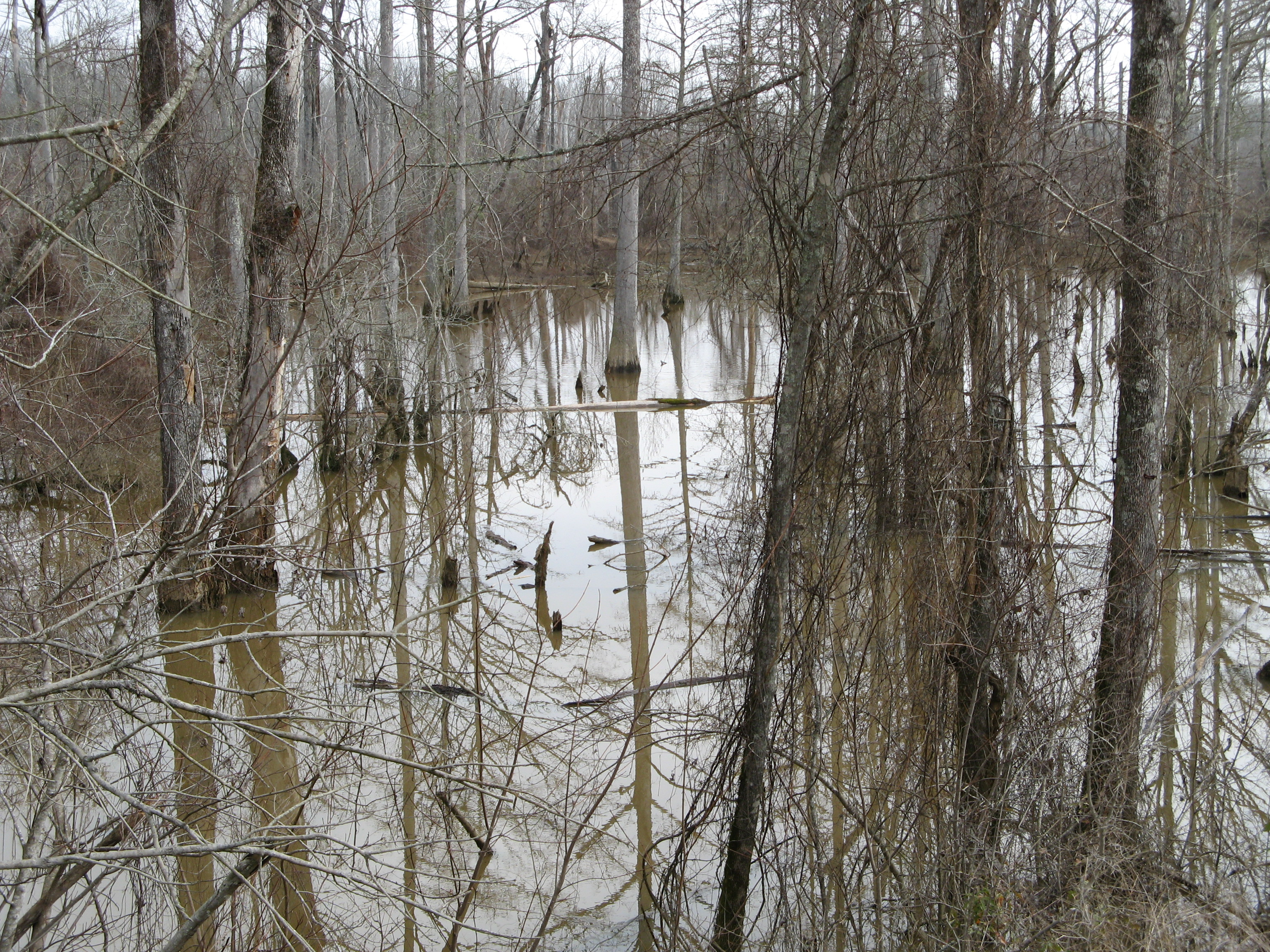
Swamp in Carroll County in winter

From 1940 to 1970, the county population declined markedly, as many African Americans left in the Great Migration to West Coast cities that had a growing defense industry. Others went North to Chicago and other industrial cities. Rural whites also moved to cities to find work.

=== Racial and ethnic composition ===
Carroll County, Mississippi – Racial and ethnic composition Note: the US Census treats Hispanic/Latino as an ethnic category. This table excludes Latinos from the racial categories and assigns them to a separate category. Hispanics/Latinos may be of any race.
Race / Ethnicity (NH = Non-Hispanic)	Pop 1980	Pop 1990	Pop 2000	Pop 2010	Pop 2020	% 1980	% 1990	% 2000	% 2010	% 2020
White alone (NH)	5,309	5,541	6,705	6,927	6,529	54.31%	59.99%	62.26%	65.37%	65.30%
Black or African American alone (NH)	4,309	3,633	3,926	3,444	3,030	44.08%	39.33%	36.46%	32.50%	30.31%
Native American or Alaska Native alone (NH)	6	11	6	15	15	0.06%	0.12%	0.06%	0.14%	0.15%
Asian alone (NH)	2	10	17	19	29	0.02%	0.11%	0.16%	0.18%	0.29%
Native Hawaiian or Pacific Islander alone (NH)	x	x	1	0	0	x	x	0.01%	0.00%	0.00%
Other race alone (NH)	4	0	0	3	18	0.04%	0.00%	0.00%	0.03%	0.18%
Mixed race or Multiracial (NH)	x	x	35	83	223	x	x	0.33%	0.78%	2.23%
Hispanic or Latino (any race)	146	42	79	106	154	1.49%	0.45%	0.73%	1.00%	1.54%
Total	9,776	9,237	10,769	10,597	9,998	100.00%	100.00%	100.00%	100.00%	100.00%

=== 2020 census ===
As of the 2020 census, the county had a population of 9,998. The median age was 47.3 years. 18.8% of residents were under the age of 18 and 23.5% of residents were 65 years of age or older. For every 100 females there were 105.5 males, and for every 100 females age 18 and over there were 104.9 males age 18 and over.

The racial makeup of the county was 65.4% White, 30.4% Black or African American, 0.2% American Indian and Alaska Native, 0.3% Asian, <0.1% Native Hawaiian and Pacific Islander, 1.1% from some other race, and 2.5% from two or more races. Hispanic or Latino residents of any race comprised 1.5% of the population.

<0.1% of residents lived in urban areas, while 100.0% lived in rural areas.

There were 4,040 households in the county, of which 27.0% had children under the age of 18 living in them. Of all households, 48.0% were married-couple households, 19.0% were households with a male householder and no spouse or partner present, and 29.0% were households with a female householder and no spouse or partner present. About 30.1% of all households were made up of individuals and 15.0% had someone living alone who was 65 years of age or older.

There were 4,914 housing units, of which 17.8% were vacant. Among occupied housing units, 82.0% were owner-occupied and 18.0% were renter-occupied. The homeowner vacancy rate was 1.0% and the rental vacancy rate was 16.8%.

=== 2000 census ===
As of the 2000 United States census, there were 10,769 people, 4,071 households, and 3,069 families in the county. The population density was 17 per square mile (6.6/km^{2}). There were 4,888 housing units at an average density of 8 per square mile (3.1/km^{2}). The racial makeup of the county was 62.67% White, 36.61% Black or African American, 0.07% Native American, 0.16% Asian, 0.01% Pacific Islander, 0.13% from other races, and 0.36% from two or more races. 0.73% of the population were Hispanic or Latino of any race.

There were 4,071 households, out of which 32.10% had children under the age of 18 living with them, 56.20% were married couples living together, 15.20% had a female householder with no husband present, and 24.60% were non-families. 22.40% of all households were made up of individuals, and 10.80% had someone living alone who was 65 years of age or older. The average household size was 2.57 and the average family size was 3.01.

The largest ancestry groups in Carroll County were English 51%, African 38.6%, and Scots-Irish 12.1%

The county population contained 24.50% under the age of 18, 9.60% from 18 to 24, 26.70% from 25 to 44, 25.70% from 45 to 64, and 13.60% who were 65 years of age or older. The median age was 38 years. For every 100 females, there were 99.20 males. For every 100 females age 18 and over, there were 97.00 males.

The median income for a household in the county was $28,878, and the median income for a family was $35,711. Males had a median income of $28,459 versus $19,695 for females. The per capita income for the county was $15,744. About 13.70% of families and 16.00% of the population were below the poverty line, including 17.30% of those under age 18 and 23.50% of those age 65 or over.

== Education ==
Carroll County School District is the area public school district. It operates one high school, J. Z. George High School, and formerly operated Vaiden High School.

Carroll Academy is an area private school that is financially supported by the Council of Conservative Citizens, a white supremacist group.

Pillow Academy in unincorporated Leflore County, near Greenwood, enrolls some students from Carroll County. It originally was a segregation academy.

== Communities ==
=== Towns ===
- Carrollton (2nd county seat)
- North Carrollton
- Vaiden (1st county seat)

=== Unincorporated places ===
- Avalon
- Black Hawk
- Coila
- McCarley
- Oklahoma
- Teoc
- Valley Hill

== Notable people ==
- Henry Pinckney McCain - US Army General, born in Carroll County 1861
- Lafayette Joseph Lott – Democratic politician, born in Carroll County 1863
- John S. McCain, Sr. - (US Navy Admiral), born in Carroll County 1884
- Mississippi John Hurt - Musician, born in Carroll County 1893

== Politics ==
Carroll County is a Republican stronghold. The last time it voted for a Democratic candidate was Jimmy Carter in 1976.

United States presidential election results for Carroll County, Mississippi
Year	Republican		Democratic		Third party(ies)	
Year	No.	%	No.	%	No.	%
1912	16	2.09%	653	85.36%	96	12.55%
1916	34	3.42%	943	94.96%	16	1.61%
1920	184	21.30%	669	77.43%	11	1.27%
1924	70	7.25%	895	92.75%	0	0.00%
1928	49	4.26%	1,102	95.74%	0	0.00%
1932	9	0.75%	1,189	99.17%	1	0.08%
1936	19	1.81%	1,030	98.10%	1	0.10%
1940	38	2.63%	1,408	97.37%	0	0.00%
1944	68	4.52%	1,438	95.48%	0	0.00%
1948	14	1.14%	74	6.04%	1,138	92.82%
1952	535	31.42%	1,168	68.58%	0	0.00%
1956	234	15.09%	1,080	69.63%	237	15.28%
1960	207	14.06%	425	28.87%	840	57.07%
1964	2,043	95.42%	98	4.58%	0	0.00%
1968	138	4.32%	925	28.96%	2,131	66.72%
1972	1,777	73.31%	580	23.93%	67	2.76%
1976	1,561	49.29%	1,566	49.45%	40	1.26%
1980	2,153	50.92%	2,037	48.18%	38	0.90%
1984	2,823	65.70%	1,462	34.02%	12	0.28%
1988	2,628	62.51%	1,560	37.11%	16	0.38%
1992	1,695	54.96%	1,182	38.33%	207	6.71%
1996	2,629	53.28%	2,041	41.37%	264	5.35%
2000	3,165	64.28%	1,726	35.05%	33	0.67%
2004	3,664	65.52%	1,900	33.98%	28	0.50%
2008	3,902	65.41%	2,037	34.15%	26	0.44%
2012	3,960	66.09%	2,007	33.49%	25	0.42%
2016	3,799	68.72%	1,680	30.39%	49	0.89%
2020	3,924	68.83%	1,729	30.33%	48	0.84%
2024	3,730	71.81%	1,431	27.55%	33	0.64%

== See also ==
- National Register of Historic Places listings in Carroll County, Mississippi
