= List of United States tornadoes from January to March 2024 =

List of tornadoes in the United States

United States tornadoes from January to March 2024
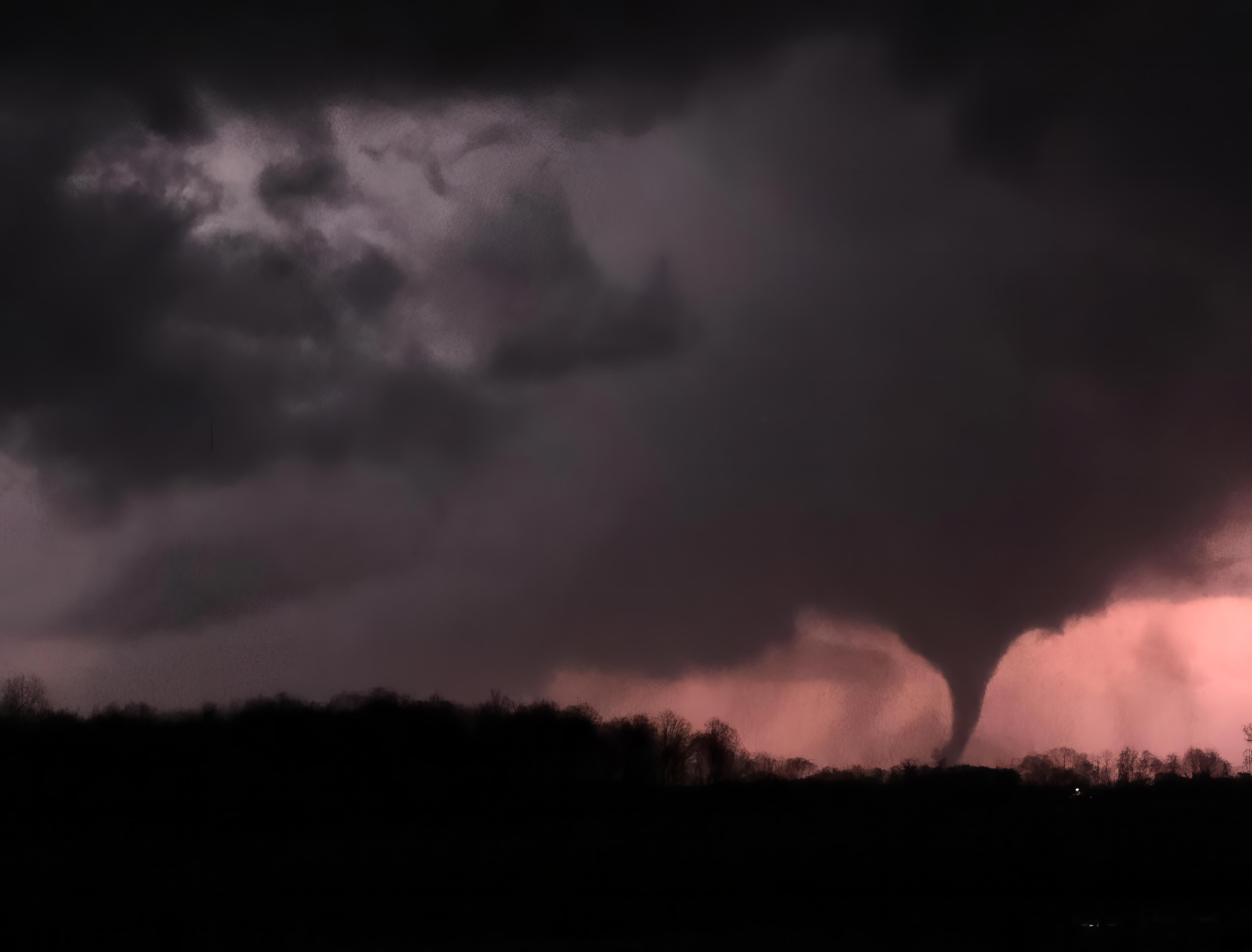
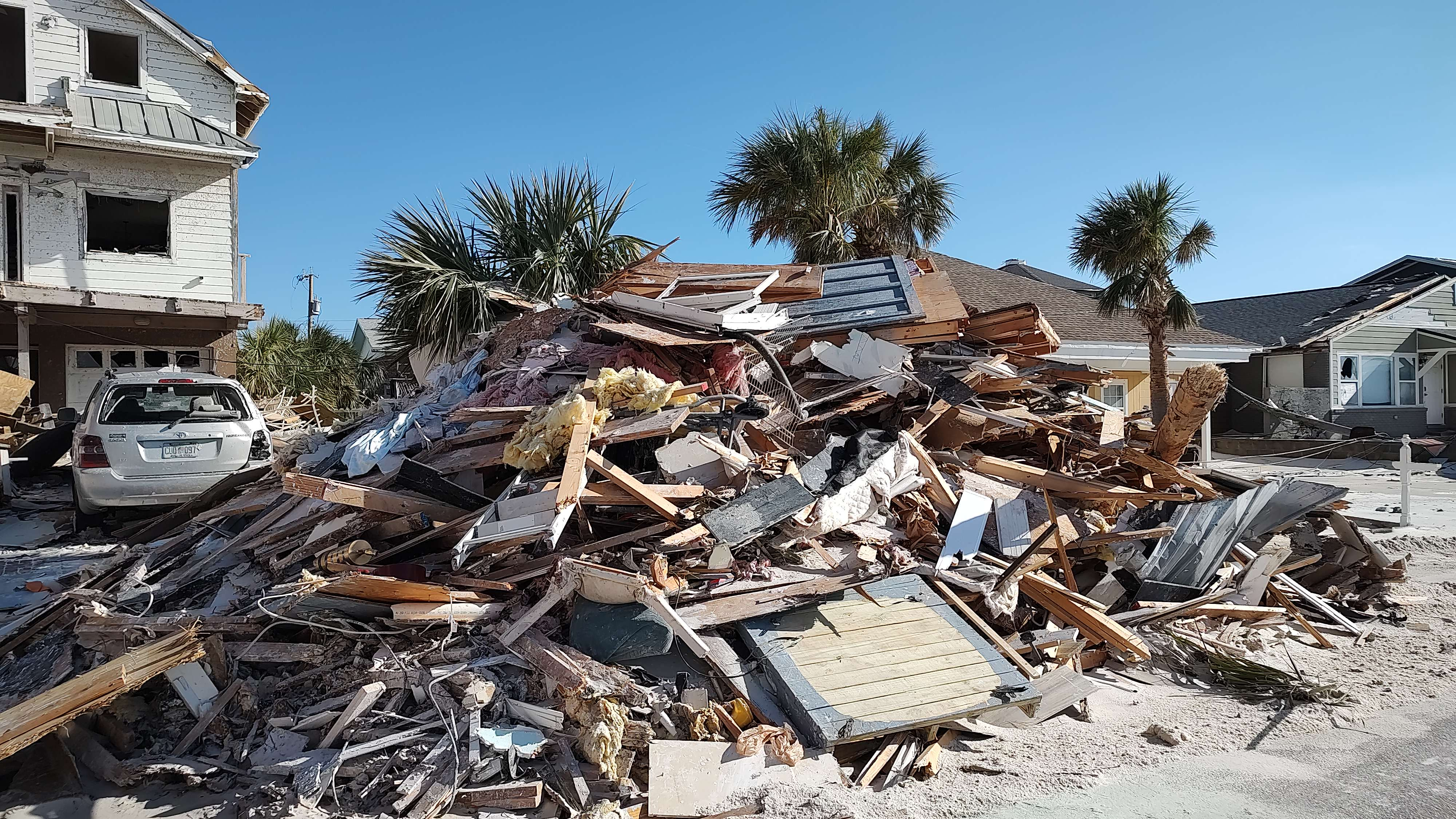
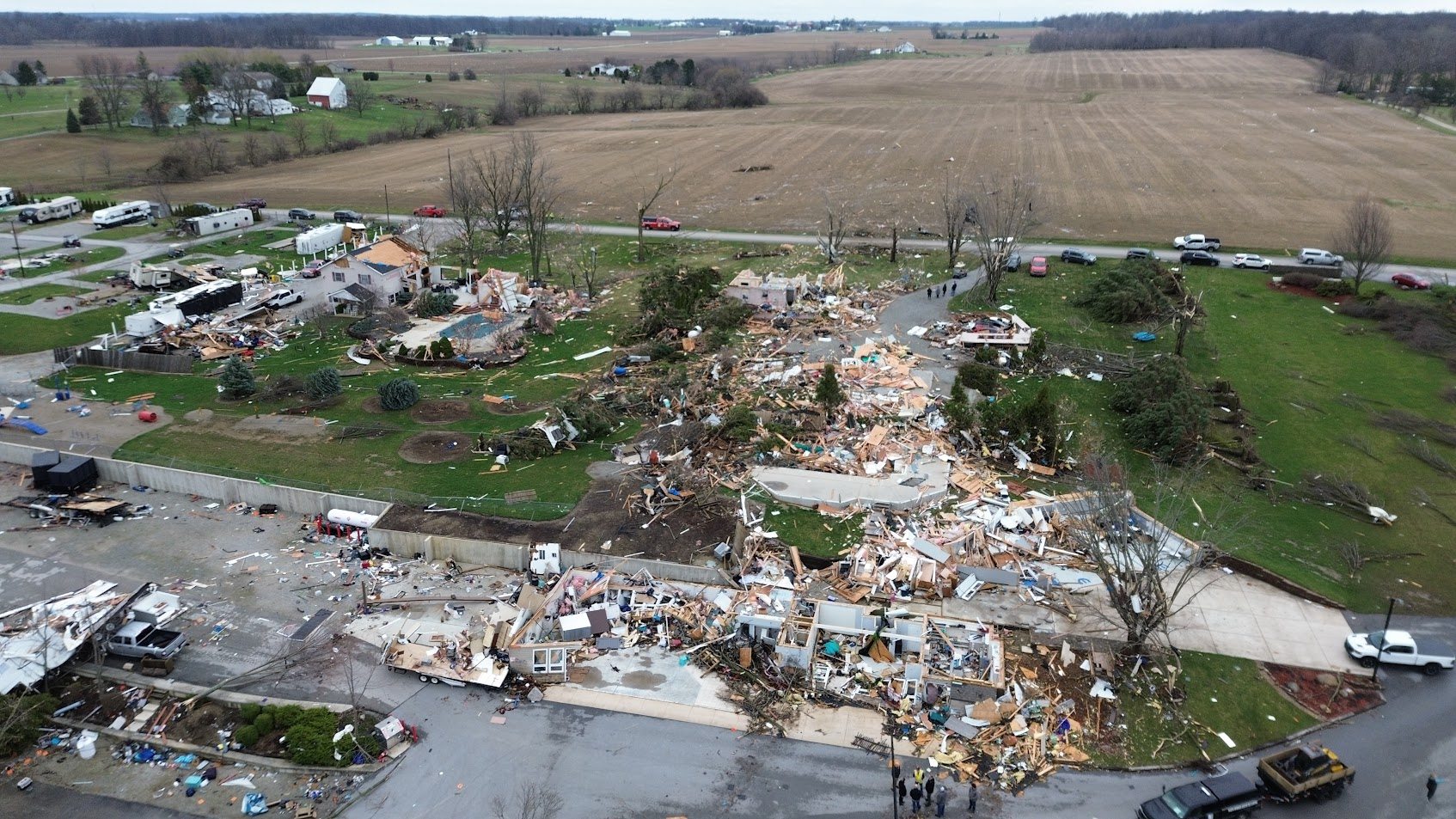
- Clockwise from top: A high-end EF3 tornado as seen from Goodland, Indiana on March 14; A destroyed home in Lower Grand Lagoon, Florida after an EF3 tornado on January 9; Significant damage in Fryburg, Ohio after a deadly EF3 tornado on March 14
- Timespan: January 5 – March 26
- Maximum rated tornado: EF3 tornado: Lower Grand Lagoon, Florida on January 9; Fryburg–Lakeview, Ohio on March 14; Winchester, Indiana on March 14
- Tornadoes: 149
- Fatalities: 6
- Injuries: 96

This page documents all tornadoes confirmed by various weather forecast offices of the National Weather Service in the United States from January to March 2024. Tornado counts are considered preliminary until final publication in the database of the National Centers for Environmental Information. Based on the 1991–2020 average, about 39 tornadoes are typically recorded across the United States during January, about 36 tornadoes are recorded in February, and about 80 tornadoes are recorded in March. These tornadoes are commonly focused across the Southern United States due to their proximity to the unstable air mass and warm waters of the Gulf of Mexico, as well as California in association with winter storms in those three months. With the arrival of spring, activity begins to shift northward especially later in March.

January saw slightly above-average levels of tornado activity with 45 tornadoes, focused heavily on a single outbreak early in the month in the climatologically favored Deep South. February also had slightly above-average levels of tornado activity with 47 tornadoes. Many of those tornadoes occurred much further north than is typical for the month, in the Midwest and Great Lakes regions, including Wisconsin, which experienced tornadoes in February for the first time since modern records began in 1950. About half of the tornadoes during the month touched down during an outbreak at the end of the month. The amount of tornadic activity did not increase after the first two months of the year, and March had well below-average activity with just 57 tornadoes. The bulk of the tornadoes that occurred in March came during a destructive outbreak in the middle of the month. Additionally, for the first time since 2018, no violent tornadoes occurred in the United States in March.

== January ==
Confirmed tornadoes by Enhanced Fujita rating
EFU	EF0	EF1	EF2	EF3	EF4	EF5	Total
1	20	17	6	1	0	0	45

=== January 5 event ===
List of confirmed tornadoes – Friday, January 5, 2024 (Note: All dates are based on the local time zone where the tornado touched down; however, all times are in Coordinated Universal Time for consistency.)
EF#	Location	County / Parish	State	Start Coord.	Time (UTC)	Path length	Max width
EF0	WNW of Lake Jackson	Brazoria	TX	29.0583°N 95.5023°W	11:56–11:58	0.59 mi (0.95 km)	200 yd (180 m)
EF0	Some trees were snapped and uprooted, power lines were damaged, and some homes had minor structural damage.						

=== January 6 event ===
List of confirmed tornadoes – Saturday, January 6, 2024
EF#	Location	County / Parish	State	Start Coord.	Time (UTC)	Path length	Max width
EFU	SW of Loxahatchee	Palm Beach	FL	26.5273°N 80.4902°W	20:32–20:34	0.78 mi (1.26 km)	100 yd (91 m)
EFU	High-resolution satellite imagery showed a tornado damage path through a field.						
EF0	Fort Lauderdale	Broward	FL	26.1076°N 80.1297°W	22:47–22:50	1.56 mi (2.51 km)	100 yd (91 m)
EF0	A tornado moved through the downtown Fort Lauderdale area, initially causing large branches to fall in front of a home. It then tracked northeast through the Rio Vista Isles neighborhood, crossed New River (Broward County, Florida), and continued through additional urban streets. Tree damage and scattered debris were observed before the tornado lifted after crossing Las Olas Boulevard.						

=== January 8 event ===
List of confirmed tornadoes – Monday, January 8, 2024
EF#	Location	County / Parish	State	Start Coord.	Time (UTC)	Path length	Max width
EF0	Supreme	Assumption	LA	29.85°N 90.99°W	21:42–21:43	0.88 mi (1.42 km)	200 yd (180 m)
EF0	A brief high-end EF0 tornado caused damage in Supreme. A poorly-anchored and frail mobile home was tossed into a fire station building and a few other mobile homes had their roofs damaged. Tree and power pole damage also occurred.						
EF0	NW of Agricola	George	MS	30.8358°N 88.5724°W	01:25–01:27	2.09 mi (3.36 km)	20 yd (18 m)
EF0	A weak tornado moved across open fields, uprooting some small softwood trees.						
EF0	SW of Lucedale	George	MS	30.8681°N 88.6267°W	01:31–01:32	0.19 mi (0.31 km)	20 yd (18 m)
EF0	A frame home and mobile home sustained minor damage from a brief tornado.						

=== January 9 event ===
List of confirmed tornadoes – Tuesday, January 9, 2024
EF#	Location	County / Parish	State	Start Coord.	Time (UTC)	Path length	Max width
EF0	W of Eglin Air Force Base	Santa Rosa	FL	30.4986°N 87.0123°W	08:29–08:34	1.74 mi (2.80 km)	150 yd (140 m)
EF0	This tornado developed over the Escribano Point Wildlife Management Area and moved through wooded areas, snapping trees and tree branches. A wooden sign was ripped out of the ground as well.						
EF1	NNW of Shipman	George	MS	30.9028°N 88.4892°W	09:24–09:25	0.21 mi (0.34 km)	30 yd (27 m)
EF1	Several pine trees were snapped three to fifteen feet (0.9 to 5 m) above ground level as a result of this brief tornado.						
EF0	ESE of Tanner Williams	Mobile	AL	30.7035°N 88.3304°W	09:47–09:51	2.99 mi (4.81 km)	20 yd (18 m)
EF0	Minor tree damage occurred along the path of this tornado.						
EF0	Western Mobile	Mobile	AL	30.6396°N 88.2435°W	09:56–09:58	1.48 mi (2.38 km)	20 yd (18 m)
EF0	A weak tornado touched down in the western part of Mobile, where a business sustained roof damage, a brick wall was knocked over, and fencing was downed. An RV was rolled and trees were downed as well.						
EF0	NE of Coden	Mobile	AL	30.4046°N 88.1839°W	10:12–10:14	0.66 mi (1.06 km)	30 yd (27 m)
EF0	A few trees were uprooted and minor vegetation damage occurred.						
EF1	Santa Rosa Beach to SSE of Freeport	Walton	FL	30.346°N 86.2317°W	10:29–10:39	10.93 mi (17.59 km)	220 yd (200 m)
EF1	A tornadic waterspout formed over the Gulf of Mexico and moved ashore at Santa Rosa Beach, where roofs were damaged, trees were downed, and a weather station recorded a 106 mile-per-hour wind gust. The tornado crossed Choctawhatchee Bay and moved ashore again south of Freeport, partially unroofing a few homes and snapping trees before dissipating.						
EF1	ENE of Spanish Fort to SSE of Stapleton	Baldwin	AL	30.6953°N 87.8192°W	10:32–10:35	1.85 mi (2.98 km)	230 yd (210 m)
EF1	This tornado tore sections of roofing off of multiple homes and downed trees. Fencing was damaged and knocked over as well.						
EF1	SSE of Stapleton	Baldwin	AL	30.6971°N 87.7751°W	10:35–10:36	0.26 mi (0.42 km)	50 yd (46 m)
EF1	This brief tornado formed as the previous tornado was dissipating, snapping and uprooting numerous trees.						
EF0	ENE of Fairhope to N of Silverhill	Baldwin	AL	30.5537°N 87.8361°W	10:38–10:45	5.08 mi (8.18 km)	20 yd (18 m)
EF0	Tree limbs were downed and some trees were uprooted by this weak tornado.						
EF1	SSE of Eucheeanna	Walton	FL	30.5872°N 86.0243°W	10:48–10:55	5.42 mi (8.72 km)	160 yd (150 m)
EF1	A mobile home was damaged, an open air shed collapsed, and trees were snapped or uprooted by this brief tornado.						
EF0	E of Ponce de Leon	Holmes	FL	30.7121°N 85.8679°W	11:03–11:08	0.96 mi (1.54 km)	100 yd (91 m)
EF0	Trees were downed, some of which landed on vehicles, homes, and other structures.						
EF3	Lower Grand Lagoon to Western Panama City	Bay	FL	30.1384°N 85.7526°W	11:31–11:37	5.2 mi (8.4 km)	550 yd (500 m)
EF3	A powerful tornadic waterspout formed over the Gulf of Mexico and moved onshore at Panama City Beach, striking Lower Grand Lagoon. A beachfront home was leveled after it was ripped from its raised wooden pier foundation, a three-story home was tipped over and left leaning against a neighboring house, and multiple other homes and condominiums had roofs and exterior walls torn off. A small breakfast restaurant collapsed, other businesses were damaged, and multiple apartment buildings were unroofed and sustained collapse of numerous second floor walls. Power poles were snapped, boats were tossed around, and several large metal boat storage warehouses were severely damaged at Pirate's Cove Marina, one of which was left with its structural beams severely mangled. The tornado then weakened as it struck Upper Grand Lagoon, causing less intense damage to some homes and a metal building. It continued across St. Andrews Bay and moved back onshore in the western part of Panama City. Several homes had roof and exterior damage, a business lost a large section of its roof, and a large truck was overturned in this area before the tornado dissipated. The tornado caused $15.35 million (2024 USD) in damage.						
EF0	St. Andrews State Park	Bay	FL	30.1322°N 85.7452°W	11:31–11:32	0.23 mi (0.37 km)	50 yd (46 m)
EF0	A satellite tornado of the Lower Grand Lagoon EF3 tornado moved ashore, damaging an antenna and some tree limbs.						
EF2	Lynn Haven to NNW of Youngstown	Bay	FL	30.2403°N 85.6419°W	11:43–11:55	12.89 mi (20.74 km)	600 yd (550 m)
EF2	After the Lower Grand Lagoon EF3 tornado dissipated, the same supercell produced this tornado that touched down in Lynn Haven, initially downing trees and causing minor roof damage in town. It strengthened to high-end EF2 intensity as it moved to the northeast and impacted neighborhoods along the shores of Deer Point Lake, where several frame homes had roof and exterior wall loss, and one house had its entire second story removed. Mobile homes were heavily damaged or destroyed, one of which was ripped from its anchors and thrown into a tree. An RV, a metal storage shed, and multiple garages were destroyed as well. The tornado then weakened as it moved to the northeast, inflicting less intense damage to houses and mobile homes and snapping many trees before it dissipated near Youngstown.						
EF1	SSE of Dothan	Houston	AL	31.135°N 85.3554°W	11:53–11:55	1.2 mi (1.9 km)	225 yd (206 m)
EF1	Several homes sustained roof damage and many trees were snapped.						
EF1	N of Fountain to SE of Alford	Bay, Calhoun, Jackson	FL	30.5135°N 85.3949°W	12:03–12:19	9.79 mi (15.76 km)	450 yd (410 m)
EF1	Many trees were snapped or uprooted as this tornado moved through wooded areas. A few homes and mobile homes had roof damage, and several barns and small sheds were damaged as well.						
EF2	S of Marianna to ESE of Bascom	Jackson	FL	30.71°N 85.2276°W	12:25–12:43	16.33 mi (26.28 km)	600 yd (550 m)
EF2	This strong tornado formed south of Marianna and crossed I-10, where a semi-truck was flipped and numerous trees were snapped or uprooted, one of which fell on and destroyed a mobile home. Several other mobile homes and a frame home had roofing torn off in this area as well. The tornado then damaged the roof of a shed before it strengthened and crossed US 90 at the southeastern outskirts of Marianna, where it struck an RV park. Many RVs were thrown and destroyed at this location, and a few smaller permanent buildings were destroyed as well. A nearby pawn shop was partially unroofed, a gas station was damaged, and some metal storage buildings had their doors blown in and roofs peeled back in this area as well. A church near the RV park had damage to its gables, and a large cinder-block outbuilding on the property collapsed. The tornado then moved through a residential area, where multiple frame homes had their roofs torn off and a few suffered some collapse of exterior walls. Additional frame homes were heavily damaged in the Blue Spring subdivision farther to the northeast, where one home was largely destroyed and a car was flipped. The tornado weakened as it continued through rural areas to the northeast of Marianna, where the roof of a church collapsed, a couple of barns were damaged or destroyed, several mobile homes had minor damage, and many trees were snapped or uprooted. The tornado dissipated near Bascom. Seven people were injured at the RV park.						
EF1	Western DeFuniak Springs	Walton	FL	30.7333°N 86.1565°W	13:06–13:07	0.35 mi (0.56 km)	200 yd (180 m)
EF1	A tornado struck the DeFuniak Springs Airport, where a few airplane hangars were damaged. A business had its metal roof blown off, a metal carport was destroyed, and fencing was toppled. Many trees were snapped or uprooted.						
EF0	Eastern Palmetto	Fulton	GA	33.5242°N 84.6442°W	13:12–13:13	1.56 mi (2.51 km)	75 yd (69 m)
EF0	A tornado downed trees and overturned semi-truck trailers at a warehouse.						
EF2	NNW of Chipley, FL to Cottonwood, AL to NW of Gordon, AL	Jackson (FL), Houston (AL)	FL, AL	30.8676°N 85.5799°W	13:50–14:22	34.76 mi (55.94 km)	1,000 yd (910 m)
EF2	1 death – See section on this tornado – Four people were injured.						
EF0	SW of Alford	Washington	FL	30.65°N 85.45°W	13:59–14:00	0.89 mi (1.43 km)	50 yd (46 m)
EF0	Tree damage occurred.						
EF2	Callaway	Bay	FL	30.1417°N 85.5907°W	14:03–14:05	0.88 mi (1.42 km)	150 yd (140 m)
EF2	A brief, but strong low-end EF2 tornado heavily damaged or ripped the roofs off of three homes in Callaway. A manufactured home was also damaged.						
EF2	S of Arlington to NE of Morgan	Early, Calhoun	GA	31.3785°N 84.7285°W	14:46–15:07	21.73 mi (34.97 km)	800 yd (730 m)
EF2	A strong tornado touched down and passed near Arlington, overturning several center-pivot irrigation systems and completely destroying a small, unreinforced concrete block home. A two-story home in this area was shifted off its foundation, a new brick home suffered major roof damage, and a house at the edge of the damage path had minor damage. Numerous trees were snapped as the tornado moved to the northeast near Morgan, and a railroad crossing gate along US 82 was damaged. It then crossed SR 234, causing roof damage to a frame home, damaging a double-wide mobile home, destroying a small outbuilding, and overturning some additional irrigation systems before dissipating.						
EF0	E of Callaway	Leon	FL	30.3879°N 84.5895°W	15:32–15:34	0.96 mi (1.54 km)	50 yd (46 m)
EF0	A weak tornado damaged trees in the Apalachicola National Forest.						
EF1	E of Newton to N of Catawba	Catawba, Iredell	NC	35.657°N 81.157°W	17:27–17:36	9.02 mi (14.52 km)	250 yd (230 m)
EF1	1 death – This high-end EF1 tornado touched down in Catawba County south of Claremont, breaking branches and uprooting large trees. As it tracked northeastward, it reached its peak intensity as it hit the Fox Hollow subdivision at the east edge of Claremont, seriously damaging numerous manufactured homes, a few of which were mostly destroyed. One person was killed when a mobile home was rolled and four others were injured, two of them seriously. The tornado crossed the Catawba River into Iredell County, where it snapped numerous trees. It dissipated after it crossed I-40.						
EF1	W of Nicholls to NW of Alma	Coffee, Bacon	GA	31.5166°N 82.6644°W	17:55–18:05	7.27 mi (11.70 km)	400 yd (370 m)
EF1	The tornado began near SR 32 and moved northeastward, tracking across areas north of Nicholls. Barns and outbuildings were heavily damaged or destroyed, a mobile home had its porch roof torn off, and many trees were snapped or uprooted, one of which landed on and damaged a pump house. A metal power pole was partially bent over, a flag pole was snapped, a yard tractor was tossed, and an empty semi-truck trailer was overturned. A manufactured home was severely damaged and had its carport torn off shortly before the tornado dissipated.						
EF1	SSE of Bellville to S of Claxton	Evans	GA	32.1399°N 81.9121°W	18:43–18:50	4.78 mi (7.69 km)	200 yd (180 m)
EF1	Hundreds of trees were uprooted or snapped by this tornado, and a large metal outbuilding was damaged. A boat stored inside the outbuilding was moved. A center-pivot irrigation system and shed were also largely destroyed.						
EF1	SW of Lake Murray of Richland	Lexington	SC	34.0518°N 81.3548°W	19:10–19:16	3.27 mi (5.26 km)	150 yd (140 m)
EF1	Numerous trees were uprooted or snapped. One person suffered minor injuries when a large tree fell onto the roof of a home.						
EF2	Bamberg	Bamberg	SC	33.2729°N 81.0435°W	19:46–19:48	2.14 mi (3.44 km)	500 yd (460 m)
EF2	This strong tornado moved directly through downtown Bamberg, where multiple historic but frail brick buildings suffered major structural damage. The upper floors of several of the buildings were completely destroyed, and multiple front walls collapsed outward, leaving streets in downtown Bamberg covered in bricks and masonry. A barrel factory also sustained major damage, including collapse of multiple walls and a large section of its roof. Debris from the barrel factory was thrown into the town's water tower, while a dumpster and pieces of heavy equipment near the facility were tossed. A small, poorly built home on stilts collapsed, other homes in town had roof and window damage, and a mobile home was rolled into a tree. A metal garage building was unroofed and had its doors blown out, the Bamberg County Magistrate Office had minor roof damage, and a semi-trailer was overturned. Siding was torn off a Hardee's, and many trees were snapped or uprooted in town.						
EF1	NW of Westchase	Hillsborough	FL	28.1061°N 82.6458°W	21:00–21:02	0.58 mi (0.93 km)	75 yd (69 m)
EF1	A number of homes in a subdivision had their screened-in pool enclosures damaged or destroyed, and trees and tree limbs were snapped.						
EF0	SSW of Bayard	Duval	FL	30.125°N 81.5317°W	21:08–21:10	0.23 mi (370 m)	30 yd (27 m)
EF0	A brief tornado touched down within the Jacksonville metropolitan area. Several homes had their rain gutters and window screens damaged, and several trees and large limbs were knocked down.						
EF0	St. Petersburg	Pinellas	FL	29.7528°N 82.6401°W	21:23–21:24	0.01 mi (16 m)	10 yd (9.1 m)
EF0	An apartment building had some of its roofing material blown off as a result of this very brief, weak tornado.						
EF1	N of New Bern	Craven	NC	35.196°N 77.0561°W	01:03–01:11	5.02 mi (8.08 km)	125 yd (114 m)
EF1	An agricultural building had metal roofing torn off, while a house and an outbuilding sustained shingle damage. Multiple trees were snapped along the path as well.						
EF1	Harkers Island (1st tornado)	Carteret	NC	34.6933°N 76.5592°W	02:09–02:11	0.23 mi (0.37 km)	75 yd (69 m)
EF1	This tornado, which occurred simultaneously with the tornado listed below, likely originated as a tornadic waterspout over Back Sound before moving inland. A house suffered major roof damage and had one of its exterior walls blown out, while a wooden 2x4 was speared through the front wall of another house that had its windows shattered. Several other homes sustained minor roof shingle damage, a power pole was snapped, and a metal storage shed was lofted and thrown.						
EF0	Harkers Island (2nd tornado)	Carteret	NC	34.6982°N 76.579°W	02:09–02:13	0.14 mi (0.23 km)	60 yd (55 m)
EF0	This tornado, which occurred simultaneously with the tornado listed above, likely originated as a tornadic waterspout over Back Sound before moving inland. One house sustained considerable roof damage, while multiple other houses and a few storage sheds had shingles blown off. Skirting was torn from a mobile home, and many trees were damaged or toppled over.						

=== January 15 event ===
List of confirmed tornadoes – Monday, January 15, 2024
EF#	Location	County / Parish	State	Start Coord.	Time (UTC)	Path length	Max width
EF0	Palm City to Stuart	Martin, St. Lucie	FL	27.1272°N 80.353°W	21:43–22:08	8.22 mi (13.23 km)	50 yd (46 m)
EF0	A weak tornado touched down southwest of I-95 and moved north-northeast, crossing the highway and downing numerous trees in Palm City. The tornado caused minor and intermittent tree damage in nearby Stuart. It briefly became a waterspout as it crossed the St. Lucie River and downed more trees on the opposite shore before dissipating.						

=== January 27 event ===
List of confirmed tornadoes – Saturday, January 27, 2024
EF#	Location	County / Parish	State	Start Coord.	Time (UTC)	Path length	Max width
EF1	NNW of Pontiac	Richland	SC	34.1614°N 80.859°W	20:48–20:50	0.89 mi (1.43 km)	90 yd (82 m)
EF1	Numerous trees were snapped or uprooted.						
EF1	NE of Saluda	Saluda	SC	34.06°N 81.67°W	01:18–01:22	1.62 mi (2.61 km)	150 yd (140 m)
EF1	A brief tornado damaged the fascia and shingles of two houses and downed several hundred trees before it dissipated in an open field.						
EF0	S of Silverstreet	Saluda	SC	34.15°N 81.72°W	01:22–01:24	1.34 mi (2.16 km)	100 yd (91 m)
EF0	Some tree damage occurred.						

== February ==
Confirmed tornadoes by Enhanced Fujita rating
EFU	EF0	EF1	EF2	EF3	EF4	EF5	Total
6	12	22	7	0	0	0	47

=== February 1 event ===
List of confirmed tornadoes – Thursday, February 1, 2024
EF#	Location	County / Parish	State	Start Coord.	Time (UTC)	Path length	Max width
EFU	WSW of Two Rock	Sonoma	CA	38.26°N 122.81°W	19:11–19:13	0.1 mi (0.16 km)	20 yd (18 m)
EFU	A weak tornado was recorded as it remained stationary over a valley.						

=== February 2 event ===
List of confirmed tornadoes – Friday, February 2, 2024
EF#	Location	County / Parish	State	Start Coord.	Time (UTC)	Path length	Max width
EF2	SSE of Sagerton	Haskell	TX	33.0199°N 99.9494°W	23:12–23:16	2.31 mi (3.72 km)	48 yd (44 m)
EF2	A low-end EF2 tornado damaged a home and multiple nearby structures, including a metal barn that collapsed. A mobile home was tossed 30 yards (27 m) and destroyed, and a horse trailer was thrown 300 yards (270 m) from where it originated.						
EFU	E of Sagerton	Haskell	TX	33.08°N 99.87°W	23:32–23:35	Unknown	Unknown
EFU	A storm chaser reported a tornado.						

=== February 4 event ===
List of confirmed tornadoes – Sunday, February 4, 2024
EF#	Location	County / Parish	State	Start Coord.	Time (UTC)	Path length	Max width
EF0	SW of Monticello	Jefferson	FL	30.4776°N 83.9058°W	18:31–18:32	0.18 mi (0.29 km)	50 yd (46 m)
EF0	A brief tornado touched down along I-10, damaging trees on both sides of the interstate.						
EF1	SW of Boston	Thomas	GA	33.7422°N 83.8357°W	19:03–19:06	0.79 mi (1.27 km)	400 yd (370 m)
EF1	Many trees were snapped or uprooted on the property of the historic Seminole Plantation, one of which landed on a building. Shingles were torn off cottages as well, one of which sustained damage to its chimney. Another cottage lost part of its wooden frame, and some open-air barns were also damaged. A house sustained minor roof damage elsewhere along the path, and some outbuildings and metal structures were damaged.						
EF2	NNE of Dasher to NE of Valdosta	Lowndes	GA	33.7707°N 83.2008°W	20:05–20:18	7.27 mi (11.70 km)	200 yd (180 m)
EF2	A strong tornado completely destroyed two manufactured homes and an outbuilding. A metal building was severely damaged, many trees were snapped or uprooted, and several other houses and mobile homes suffered less severe roof, siding, and window damage. Two people were injured.						
EF1	E of Maxville	Duval	FL	30.1988°N 81.9119°W	21:11–21:15	1.05 mi (1.69 km)	200 yd (180 m)
EF1	This tornado uprooted trees, which landed on and caused damage to about a dozen homes. A manufactured home was partially unroofed, and fencing was damaged nearby. Large tree limbs were snapped as well.						
EF1	NE of Starke	Clay	FL	29.9881°N 82.0338°W	21:13–21:18	0.98 mi (1.58 km)	100 yd (91 m)
EF1	A tornado snapped and uprooted pine trees within the Camp Blanding Wildlife Management Area.						
EF0	Western Jacksonville	Duval	FL	30.2573°N 81.8646°W	22:05–22:07	1.38 mi (2.22 km)	25 yd (23 m)
EF0	This high-end EF0 tornado caused tree and fence damage as it impacted the western outskirts of Jacksonville. A dumpster was overturned as well.						

=== February 7 event ===
List of confirmed tornadoes – Wednesday, February 7, 2024
EF#	Location	County / Parish	State	Start Coord.	Time (UTC)	Path length	Max width
EF1	ESE of Los Osos to W of San Luis Obispo	San Luis Obispo	CA	35.2993°N 120.8132°W	23:41–23:47	4.87 mi (7.84 km)	50 yd (46 m)
EF1	Several power poles were snapped or damaged. A couple of outbuildings had minor damage, and material was torn off a greenhouse.						
EF1	Grover Beach	San Luis Obispo	CA	35.1206°N 120.6233°W	23:57–23:59	0.69 mi (1.11 km)	50 yd (46 m)
EF1	Many trees were snapped or uprooted in Grover Beach, some of which landed on structures and power lines. Businesses had roof damage, and a metal garage door was buckled at one building. Fences and gates were damaged or blown over as well. Some additional tree damage occurred in the northern part of Arroyo Grande before the tornado dissipated.						

=== February 8 event ===
List of confirmed tornadoes – Thursday, February 8, 2024
EF#	Location	County / Parish	State	Start Coord.	Time (UTC)	Path length	Max width
EF1	S of Henry to SSE of McNabb	Marshall, Putnam	IL	41.07°N 89.36°W	22:40–22:52	10.03 mi (16.14 km)	100 yd (91 m)
EF1	A high-end EF1 tornado damaged or destroyed multiple farm outbuildings, sheds, and a metal garage. A semi-truck was flipped over, and trees and tree branches were snapped as well.						
EF1	NW of Juda to SE of Albany	Green	WI	42.5992°N 89.5278°W	23:23–23:33	8.33 mi (13.41 km)	50 yd (46 m)
EF1	A frail, prefabricated home was unroofed and sustained collapse of exterior walls as a result of this high-end EF1 tornado. Another house had roof and siding damage, and a rooftop antenna was bent at a third home. Several campers were tossed or rolled, and multiple outbuildings were damaged or destroyed. Many trees were snapped along the path. This was the first recorded February tornado in Wisconsin.						
EF2	S of Evansville to Porter to W of Fort Atkinson	Rock, Dane, Jefferson	WI	42.7242°N 89.3316°W	23:39–00:17	25.9 mi (41.7 km)	750 yd (690 m)
EF2	The same supercell that produced the previous tornado in Green County then produced this strong, long-tracked EF2 tornado that touched down near Evansville. A few homes had large sections of their roofs torn off, while many barns, sheds, and metal farm buildings were heavily damaged or destroyed, some of which were obliterated with debris strewn long distances through fields. A silo was also destroyed, farming equipment was tossed around, trees and power poles were snapped, and a metal road sign was bent to the ground. It then struck Porter, where a two-story home lost most of its roof, another house had siding and window damage, and large barns and outbuildings were destroyed. Farming equipment was tossed around, trees and power poles were snapped, and one person was injured when the tornado blew their car off a road into a ditch. Significant damage continued to the northeast of Porter, where a house had its roof and attached garage destroyed, several other homes had considerable damage, many additional farm buildings were destroyed, extensive tree damage occurred, and an equipment trailer was tossed. Continuing to the northeast, the tornado weakened and struck the south side of Albion, where several homes had roof damage and one had a garage wall blown out. A metal building also had minor roof damage, a semi-trailer was overturned, and trees were downed. The tornado caused moderate damage to trees and structures as it moved northeastward past Albion, following the shoreline of Lake Koshkonong and passing through the community of Busseyville before dissipating. One person was injured when the tornado blew their car off a road into a ditch. The National Oceanic and Atmospheric Administration published that the tornado caused more than $2.5 million in damage.						

=== February 9 event ===
List of confirmed tornadoes – Friday, February 9, 2024
EF#	Location	County / Parish	State	Start Coord.	Time (UTC)	Path length	Max width
EFU	SSW of Pierceville	Finney	KS	37.8502°N 100.6815°W	20:15–20:20	0.1 mi (0.16 km)	25 yd (23 m)
EFU	A landspout tornado was photographed. No damage was reported.						
EF1	S of Shannon Hills to SSW of Landmark	Saline	AR	34.5247°N 92.3942°W	00:46–00:50	2.51 mi (4.04 km)	500 yd (460 m)
EF1	A metal building that was under construction had part of its roof torn off, an outbuilding was damaged, and a dumpster was overturned. Trees were uprooted or snapped, and power lines were also downed.						

=== February 10 event ===
List of confirmed tornadoes – Saturday, February 10, 2024
EF#	Location	County / Parish	State	Start Coord.	Time (UTC)	Path length	Max width
EF1	S of Underwood	Clark	IN	38.5899°N 85.7786°W	09:49–09:50	1.03 mi (1.66 km)	75 yd (69 m)
EF1	A short-lived low-end EF1 tornado embedded within a larger area of damaging straight-line winds damaged or destroyed multiple outbuildings. Some homes suffered minor roof damage, and trees were snapped or uprooted as well.						
EF1	Port Royal	Henry	KY	38.5553°N 85.0889°W	10:32–10:34	1 mi (1.6 km)	75 yd (69 m)
EF1	A short-lived EF1 tornado first caused sporadic tree damage west of Port Royal before entering the community and causing damage, destroying a pole barn and producing roof and siding damage to structures. The tornado then caused further tree damage before it dissipated in a field east of Port Royal.						

=== February 18 event ===
List of confirmed tornadoes – Sunday, February 18, 2024
EF#	Location	County / Parish	State	Start Coord.	Time (UTC)	Path length	Max width
EF0	Cudjoe Key to Big Torch Key	Monroe	FL	24.655°N 81.476°W	18:02–18:11	4.62 mi (7.44 km)	120 yd (110 m)
EF0	A waterspout over Cudjoe Bay moved ashore and impacted a residential resort, snapping numerous tree limbs. A palm tree was snapped 15 ft (4.6 m) above ground level; the upper portion of which landed on a manufactured residence, damaging a wall and scattering roof panels up to 300 yd (270 m) away. Several homes lost sections of siding as well, and a small hardwood tree was toppled over. The tornado then crossed over Little Knockemdown Key, causing no known damage. The tornado became a waterspout once more before landfalling on Big Torch Key, where a number of tree limbs were downed. Lightweight household items were tossed around as well. The tornado lifted before exiting back onto the sea.						
EFU	WSW of Pennsuco	Miami-Dade	FL	25.84°N 80.49°W	19:57–19:59	0.63 mi (1.01 km)	30 yd (27 m)
EFU	A brief tornado caused minor damage to vegetation.						
EF0	Western Miramar to Northern Pembroke Pines	Broward	FL	25.98°N 80.34°W	20:20–20:25	3.36 mi (5.41 km)	100 yd (91 m)
EF0	An intermittent tornado downed trees and tree limbs. Fencing was damaged as well.						
EF0	Cooper City to Southern Plantation	Broward	FL	26.07°N 80.26°W	20:33–20:41	3.4 mi (5.5 km)	350 yd (320 m)
EF0	Trees and tree branches were downed, palm trees had fronds ripped off, and a few buildings had minor damage.						
EFU	Oakland Park	Broward	FL	26.17°N 80.14°W	20:55–20:56	0.19 mi (0.31 km)	50 yd (46 m)
EFU	A brief tornado flipped four cars and damaged trees. Despite the damage, the tornado was given an EFU rating.						

=== February 27 event ===
List of confirmed tornadoes – Tuesday, February 27, 2024
EF#	Location	County / Parish	State	Start Coord.	Time (UTC)	Path length	Max width
EF1	SE of Atkinson to NW of Annawan	Henry	IL	41.39°N 89.98°W	23:56–00:04	2.83 mi (4.55 km)	425 yd (389 m)
EF1	Two houses had roof and siding damage, a shop building was destroyed, and a semi-truck was flipped on I-80. Tree branches were downed as well.						
EF0	NE of Compton	Lee	IL	41.7168°N 89.0537°W	00:15–00:16	0.05 mi (0.080 km)	10 yd (9.1 m)
EF0	A brief tornado caused roof damage to a farm outbuilding.						
EFU	NNE of Waterman	DeKalb	IL	41.8034°N 88.7514°W	00:28–00:30	1.3 mi (2.1 km)	120 yd (110 m)
EFU	This tornado moved only through open fields, causing no damage. There was damage to a farmstead in this area, though it was determined to have been caused by straight-line winds.						
EF0	S of Hinckley to Big Rock	DeKalb, Kane	IL	41.7507°N 88.652°W	00:53–00:59	5.39 mi (8.67 km)	175 yd (160 m)
EF0	Storm chasers documented this tornado, which was embedded in the northern part of a larger area of damaging winds. Multiple farm outbuildings were damaged, homes sustained roof shingle damage, and tree limbs were downed. A camper was overturned, and a children's playset was damaged. The tornado entered Big Rock and caused some minor roof damage before dissipating.						
EF0	SE of Maple Park to Western Campton Hills	Kane	IL	41.8799°N 88.5694°W	00:55–01:11	7.89 mi (12.70 km)	125 yd (114 m)
EF0	A weak intermittent tornado moved through rural areas outside of Maple Park and damaged trees, outbuildings, a windmill, a silo, and a grain elevator. A tank trailer was overturned, and sheet metal from outbuildings was deposited in fields. It entered Campton Hills, where trees were downed and minor roof shingle damage occurred before the tornado dissipated.						
EF1	Northern Sugar Grove to Western Batavia	Kane	IL	41.7949°N 88.4686°W	01:06–01:16	8.13 mi (13.08 km)	125 yd (114 m)
EF1	A tornado formed at the northern outskirts of Sugar Grove and immediately impacted Waubonsee Community College, damaging trees, signs, and a light pole. The tornado then moved through a more sparsely populated area and widened, snapping multiple trees, damaging a grain silo, and pushing a large barn off its foundation. The tornado continued to the northeast and entered the west side of Batavia, where it moved through residential areas. Shingles were blown off the roofs of homes, tree branches were downed, and street signs were damaged. The tornado struck a commercial area in town before it dissipated, where some damage occurred to signs and the roofs of businesses. A food truck was moved, a small construction trailer was tipped over, and a traffic signal was damaged as well.						
EF1	Western Geneva	Kane	IL	41.8827°N 88.3482°W	01:17–01:19	1.16 mi (1.87 km)	125 yd (114 m)
EF1	A tornado touched down in the western part of Geneva and immediately damaged a metal garage, shifting it off its foundation. A strip mall had roof and soffit damage, traffic lights were downed, and homes had roof and siding damage. Trees were snapped and uprooted in town as well.						
EF0	NW of Streamwood to South Barrington	Cook	IL	42.047°N 88.1991°W	01:29–01:35	3.83 mi (6.16 km)	300 yd (270 m)
EF0	Multiple office buildings sustained shingle and fascia damage at a business park, and a few homes had minor roof and window damage in residential areas. Several trees and many tree branches were downed.						
EF1	Hoffman Estates	Cook	IL	42.0572°N 88.1184°W	01:32–01:35	2.58 mi (4.15 km)	110 yd (100 m)
EF1	This tornado inflicted roof, siding, window, and fascia damage to many homes in Hoffman Estates. Power lines were downed, and many trees and tree limbs were snapped, including in the Paul Douglas Forest Preserve.						
EF1	South Barrington to Northern Hoffman Estates	Cook	IL	42.0722°N 88.1485°W	01:34–01:37	2.45 mi (3.94 km)	160 yd (150 m)
EF1	Homes had roof and window damage, debris was impaled into the ground and left stuck in the siding of homes, and trees were snapped or uprooted. A building had metal roofing torn off, a light pole was damaged, and a boat trailer was pushed into a car. Bus shelters and fences were blown over as well.						
EF1	Mundelein	Lake	IL	42.262°N 87.9874°W	01:55–01:56	0.11 mi (0.18 km)	40 yd (37 m)
EF1	A very brief tornado touched down in Mundelein and removed much of the roof from a two-story apartment building, leading to partial collapse of a brick façade. Two large trees were uprooted, and some tree limbs were downed as well.						
EF1	Northwestern Gary	Lake	IN	41.6349°N 87.4305°W	03:15–03:18	2.17 mi (3.49 km)	75 yd (69 m)
EF1	This tornado was caught on video and photographed by multiple people as it touched down north of the Gary/Chicago International Airport, east of East Chicago, and moved through a wooded industrial area in Gary. Trees and multiple power poles were damaged, including several recently-installed poles that were snapped. The tornado then turned northeast and moved offshore onto Lake Michigan as a tornadic waterspout.						

=== February 28 event ===
List of confirmed tornadoes – Wednesday, February 28, 2024
EF#	Location	County / Parish	State	Start Coord.	Time (UTC)	Path length	Max width
EF1	N of Marshall	Calhoun	MI	42.31°N 84.98°W	05:29–05:40	5.79 mi (9.32 km)	300 yd (270 m)
EF1	A high-end EF1 tornado touched down near the I-69 and I-94 junction and passed north of Marshall, snapping and uprooting hundreds of trees. Several homes had roofing and siding torn off, and outbuildings were damaged or destroyed.						
EF2	Grand Blanc to NW of Goodrich	Genesee	MI	42.92°N 83.67°W	06:12–06:22	5.73 mi (9.22 km)	450 yd (410 m)
EF2	A low-end EF2 tornado moved through the Flint suburb of Grand Blanc, where a large warehouse at the Waretech Industrial Park had much of its roof torn off and sustained collapse of its exterior walls. Another large industrial building was damaged nearby, semi-trailers were overturned, and debris was strewn throughout the area. Wooden power poles were snapped, light poles were downed, and large trees were snapped or uprooted, some of which landed on homes. Other houses had windows blown out and roofing torn off, a small pavilion was destroyed at Bicentennial Park, and gas leaks were reported in town.						
EF1	Riverside to Fairborn	Montgomery, Greene	OH	39.7698°N 84.1095°W	09:37–09:41	2.39 mi (3.85 km)	200 yd (180 m)
EF1	This tornado touched down in the Dayton suburb of Riverside and impacted Wright-Patterson Air Force Base, where an airplane restoration hangar was damaged and had sheet metal ripped off. A couple of airplanes were damaged by flying debris at that location, and trees and large tree limbs on base property were snapped. The tornado exited Wright-Patterson Air Force Base and moved into the neighboring suburb of Fairborn, where some apartment buildings and a commercial building had sections of roofing torn off, and a guard rail next to a road was damaged. Some minor tree damage occurred on the Wright State University campus before the tornado dissipated.						
EF2	S of Springfield to N of Lafayette	Clark, Madison	OH	39.8662°N 83.7788°W	09:52–10:11	21.11 mi (33.97 km)	500 yd (460 m)
EF2	A high-end EF2 tornado began south of Shawnee High School and moved through areas near the southeastern outskirts of Springfield, tearing the roofs off of multiple houses. A few of the houses had exterior walls knocked down, and a split-level home was almost completely destroyed, though it was not well-constructed. Several other homes had major roof damage, New Beginnings Fellowship Church was unroofed, and numerous barns and outbuildings were destroyed along this initial segment of the path. The tornado weakened as it passed near South Vienna and Choctaw Lake, destroying some outbuildings and damaging the roofs of a few homes. One house had its entire roof blown off, though contextual damage in this area was not consistent with a strong tornado. It strengthened to high-end EF2 intensity again as it struck the Madison County Airport north of London, where an airplane hangar was destroyed, other hangars were heavily damaged, and small planes were tossed. Several farm buildings were damaged or destroyed at the nearby Molly Caren Agricultural Center, and a house had its entire second floor ripped off before the tornado abruptly dissipated north of Lafayette. Many trees and several power poles were snapped along the path, and three people were injured.						
EF1	E of London to W of Galloway	Madison, Franklin	OH	39.8856°N 83.4128°W	10:14–10:28	12.3 mi (19.8 km)	250 yd (230 m)
EF1	This tornado formed near London and moved to the east-northeast, overturning a trailer and damaging trees and a few homes. One house was heavily damaged at high-end EF1 intensity, sustaining destruction of its attached garage and losing a large section of its roof. The tornado inflicted considerable damage to the roofs of several additional homes near West Jefferson and snapped or uprooted dozens of trees. Less intense damage to trees, outbuildings, and a house occurred along the final segment of the path. The tornado dissipated just before it would have entered the Columbus suburb of Galloway.						
EF1	Southern Hilliard	Franklin	OH	40.005°N 83.1844°W	10:26–10:31	3.81 mi (6.13 km)	200 yd (180 m)
EF1	A high-end EF1 tornado damaged numerous homes in the Columbus suburb of Hilliard. One house lost most of its roof and had its attached garage destroyed, another home had a garage wall blown out, and many other houses had roof shingles and siding torn off. Apartment buildings also sustained roof damage, and many trees were snapped or uprooted as well.						
EF0	W of Darbydale	Franklin	OH	39.8497°N 83.2246°W	10:28–10:29	0.51 mi (0.82 km)	60 yd (55 m)
EF0	A brief tornado snapped several trees and tree limbs and damaged the roof of an outbuilding.						
EF0	WSW of Harrisburg	Pickaway	OH	39.8038°N 83.2097°W	10:29–10:32	2.18 mi (3.51 km)	80 yd (73 m)
EF0	Trees and tree limbs were downed, and a few homes sustained minor roof damage. Debris was blown onto I-71.						
EF0	Southern Groveport to Canal Winchester	Franklin, Fairfield	OH	39.8381°N 82.8863°W	10:48–10:52	5.71 mi (9.19 km)	75 yd (69 m)
EF0	A weak tornado touched down south of Groveport and moved through Walnut Woods Metro Park, downing numerous pine trees. It then struck Canal Winchester, where minor damage to buildings occurred, a plastic gazebo was moved, and tree branches were snapped before the tornado dissipated.						
EF2	E of Gahanna to W of Granville	Franklin, Licking	OH	40.0221°N 82.8191°W	10:49–11:03	14.04 mi (22.60 km)	300 yd (270 m)
EF2	This tornado touched down near the Columbus suburb of Gahanna, initially downing trees and causing minor damage to homes as it moved through multiple subdivisions. It intensified as it entered a more sparsely populated area, where a house lost a majority of its roof and had an exterior wall collapse, with debris from the residence scattered hundreds of yards away. Numerous large trees were snapped or uprooted in this area as well. Less intense damage occurred near Jersey, where a couple of homes had roof and window damage, sheds and outbuildings were damaged or destroyed, and trees were downed. Some barns were damaged, and some tree limbs were snapped to the west of Granville before the tornado dissipated.						
EF2	SE of Miltonsburg to SW of Beallsville	Monroe	OH	39.8154°N 81.1448°W	11:22–11:26	4.05 mi (6.52 km)	200 yd (180 m)
EF2	An intermittent but strong tornado damaged multiple homes, one of which was shifted off its foundation and sustained the collapse of its attached garage. A few other houses had large sections of their roofs torn off, and several outbuildings were completely destroyed. A fifth-wheel camper was tossed 20 yd (18 m), and the roof of a mobile home was torn off and left deposited in nearby trees. A wooden power pole was snapped off and left wedged into the ground 30 yd (27 m) away from where it originated, and many large trees were snapped or uprooted along the path as well. One injury occurred. This is the third recorded tornado in Monroe County history and the first confirmed since 1990. It is also the strongest recorded tornado in the county's history.						
EF1	Southern Castle Creek	Broome	NY	42.22°N 75.95°W	21:19–21:21	0.61 mi (0.98 km)	150 yd (140 m)
EF1	A brief tornado moved through the south edge of Castle Creek, where a barn at a blueberry farm had an exterior wall ripped off, and two nearby hay wagons were thrown into a field and destroyed. A house had its brick chimney knocked over, while tree branches and pieces of debris from the barn were left speared into the ground. A small gazebo was thrown, and many trees were snapped or uprooted.						

== March ==
Confirmed tornadoes by Enhanced Fujita rating
EFU	EF0	EF1	EF2	EF3	EF4	EF5	Total
10	19	18	8	2	0	0	57

=== March 1 event ===
List of confirmed tornadoes – Friday, March 1, 2024
EF#	Location	County / Parish	State	Start Coord.	Time (UTC)	Path length	Max width
EF0	Madera Acres	Madera	CA	37.0233°N 120.0594°W	23:50–23:55	0.42 mi (0.68 km)	10 yd (9.1 m)
EF0	A few trees were toppled and uprooted around a parking lot, and a large fence was bent.						

=== March 4 event ===
List of confirmed tornadoes – Monday, March 4, 2024
EF#	Location	County / Parish	State	Start Coord.	Time (UTC)	Path length	Max width
EFU	WNW of Bolton	Stephenson	IL	42.24°N 89.78°W	19:59–20:00	0.1 mi (0.16 km)	30 yd (27 m)
EFU	A brief tornado was spotted by a storm chaser. No damage was reported.						

=== March 5 event ===
List of confirmed tornadoes – Tuesday, March 5, 2024
EF#	Location	County / Parish	State	Start Coord.	Time (UTC)	Path length	Max width
EF0	N of Weston	Umatilla	OR	45.87°N 118.42°W	19:00	0.15 mi (0.24 km)	3 yd (2.7 m)
EF0	At least one well-defined landspout was photographed, with others possibly occurring as well.						
EF0	S of Leipsic	Putnam	OH	41.0589°N 83.9805°W	19:34–19:35	0.24 mi (0.39 km)	50 yd (46 m)
EF0	A home sustained roof and siding damage, and an attached garage collapsed.						
EF0	SE of Forreston	Ellis	TX	32.25°N 96.86°W	22:45–22:48	0.25 mi (0.40 km)	50 yd (46 m)
EF0	A landspout remained over rural land.						

=== March 7 event ===
List of confirmed tornadoes – Thursday, March 7, 2024
EF#	Location	County / Parish	State	Start Coord.	Time (UTC)	Path length	Max width
EFU	ENE of Arizona City	Pinal	AZ	32.79°N 111.7014°W	21:39–21:47	0.32 mi (0.51 km)	40 yd (37 m)
EFU	A weak landspout occurred in an open field.						

=== March 9 event ===
List of confirmed tornadoes – Saturday, March 9, 2024
EF#	Location	County / Parish	State	Start Coord.	Time (UTC)	Path length	Max width
EF1	N of Mabson	Dale	AL	31.4718°N 85.5663°W	07:40–07:48	4.35 mi (7.00 km)	1,020 yd (930 m)
EF1	Numerous trees and utility poles were snapped, and roofs, doors, and porches of several outbuildings and homes were damaged. One outbuilding was shifted off its foundation.						
EF1	N of Miccosukee	Leon, Jefferson	FL	30.611°N 84.0518°W	15:42–15:51	3.42 mi (5.50 km)	355 yd (325 m)
EF1	The tornado touched down after a swath of straight-line winds, snapping and uprooting numerous trees.						
EF1	ESE of Cogdell to N of Manor	Clinch, Ware	GA	31.1551°N 82.6736°W	17:09–17:19	5.64 mi (9.08 km)	150 yd (140 m)
EF1	Trees were snapped and uprooted. A metal outbuilding and an adjacent home sustained roof damage.						
EF2	SSE of Nahunta	Brantley	GA	31.1686°N 81.968°W	18:39–18:46	4.72 mi (7.60 km)	400 yd (370 m)
EF2	This high-end EF2 tornado travelled parallel to US 82, causing extensive damage to mobile homes, including some that were flattened and wrapped around trees. A dog kennel was rolled, trees were snapped or uprooted, and an outbuilding was damaged. Five people were injured.						

=== March 13 event ===
List of confirmed tornadoes – Wednesday, March 13, 2024
EF#	Location	County / Parish	State	Start Coord.	Time (UTC)	Path length	Max width
EF2	E of Alta Vista to NE of Volland	Wabaunsee	KS	38.87°N 96.45°W	00:45–01:15	8.14 mi (13.10 km)	300 yd (270 m)
EF2	The tornado remained mostly over rural areas, causing low-end EF2 damage to hardwood trees and outbuildings.						
EF2	WNW of Rossville	Shawnee	KS	39.13°N 95.98°W	01:27–01:46	4.94 mi (7.95 km)	100 yd (91 m)
EF2	Homes and outbuildings were damaged.						

=== March 14 event ===
List of confirmed tornadoes – Thursday, March 14, 2024
EF#	Location	County / Parish	State	Start Coord.	Time (UTC)	Path length	Max width
EF1	NW of Avon	Warren, Fulton	IL	40.686°N 90.463°W	09:36–09:37	1.06 mi (1.71 km)	150 yd (140 m)
EF1	A brief but high-end EF1 tornado damaged farmsteads. Outbuildings and machine sheds were destroyed, grain bins were damaged, trees were uprooted and power poles were snapped.						
EF0	E of Fieldon to WNW of Delhi	Jersey	IL	39.096°N 90.449°W	12:28–12:38	8.65 mi (13.92 km)	100 yd (91 m)
EF0	Minor damage to trees, siding, and roofs occurred.						
EF0	S of Fidelity	Jersey, Macoupin	IL	39.137°N 90.187°W	12:44–12:48	3.9 mi (6.3 km)	75 yd (69 m)
EF0	Minor damage to trees and farm buildings occurred.						
EF0	Charlack	St. Louis	MO	38.7015°N 90.3399°W	12:46–12:47	0.1 mi (0.16 km)	50 yd (46 m)
EF0	Minor damage to trees and houses occurred.						
EF0	N of Birghton to SSE of Piasa	Jersey, Macoupin	IL	39.071°N 90.152°W	12:46–12:48	2.75 mi (4.43 km)	200 yd (180 m)
EF0	Trees, outbuildings, and transmission lines were damage.						
EF0	SW of Carlinville	Macoupin	IL	39.231°N 89.941°W	12:58–13:00	2.13 mi (3.43 km)	100 yd (91 m)
EF0	A farm building, tree limbs, and a residence were damaged.						
EF2	N of Hanover, IN to Milton, KY to E of Carrollton, KY	Jefferson (IN), Trimble (KY), Carroll (KY), Switzerland (IN)	IN, KY	38.7359°N 85.4744°W	17:58–18:24	17.97 mi (28.92 km)	500 yd (460 m)
EF2	This strong tornado formed near SR 256 on the north side of Hanover, causing minor EF1 damage to homes and trees. In Jefferson Manor subdivision several homes sustained roof damage; a newer house had its roof completely ripped off. Garages were heavily damaged, and an outbuilding was destroyed. The tornado then crossed SR 56, snapping trees before crossing the Ohio River into Kentucky, initially uprooting trees and damaging trees at high-end EF0 strength. The tornado reached EF1 intensity as it moved into the River Park Campground, where multiple trailers were flipped. The tornado then struck Milton, where damage to several homes, businesses, mobile homes, and trees was observed. It also moved over the Milton–Madison Bridge (US 421), although no damage to the bridge was reported. The tornado reached low-end EF2 intensity as it crossed KY 36 into Paradise Point, where campers and a motorhome were demolished. One tri-axle camper weighing well over 10,000 pounds (4.5 t) was rolled and thrown over 100 yd (91 m). After causing additional EF1 tree damage, the tornado briefly weakened, causing EF0 damage to trees as it crossed KY 1492 and KY 36. After moving over the Ohio River back into Indiana, the tornado quickly regained low-end EF2 intensity, knocking over and lifting several RV trailers along SR 56. Numerous boat ports had anchor supports pulled out of the ground and outbuildings and small barns were destroyed. In Switzerland County, more barns sustained significant EF1 roof damage. Extensive damage occurred to trees and power lines occurred in this area as well. The weakening tornado then crossed the Ohio River again back into Kentucky, causing minor EF0 tree damage before lifting along US 42. Two people were injured.						
EF0	S of Hoffman	McIntosh	OK	35.4302°N 95.8635°W	18:44–18:47	2.7 mi (4.3 km)	350 yd (320 m)
EF0	The tornado developed just south of I–40, snapping large tree limbs and damaging an outbuilding.						
EF0	NE of Ozark	Christian	MO	37.029°N 93.174°W	20:40–20:41	0.96 mi (1.54 km)	50 yd (46 m)
EF0	Multiple trees were uprooted or snapped. A barn and outbuilding were also damaged.						
EF1	ENE of New Corydon. IN to W of Celina, OH	Adams (IN), Mercer (OH)	IN, OH	40.5732°N 84.8025°W	22:40–22:55	9.34 mi (15.03 km)	450 yd (410 m)
EF1	This tornado formed just west of the Indiana/Ohio state line, damaging trees, shingles, and an outbuilding within Indiana. In Ohio, damage to houses, trees and outbuildings occurred, with several outbuildings being completely destroyed. This was the first tornado produced by the Lakeview supercell.						
EF1	Celina to NE of Moulton	Mercer, Auglaize	OH	40.55°N 84.57°W	23:00–23:24	15.95 mi (25.67 km)	1,050 yd (960 m)
EF1	This large, damaging high-end EF1 tornado began within the city of Celina and moved east, causing minor damage to trees and house roofs. The tornado crossed SR 29 and the circulation grew in size and strength, causing EF1-intensity damage to houses, trees, and outbuildings from west of St Marys to SR 116 east of US 33 north of the town. After this swath, the tornado steadily weakened while moving east, continuing for seven miles (11 km) before dissipating east of Wapakoneta.						
EFU	SW of Alvada	Hancock, Seneca	OH	41.0276°N 83.4217°W	23:09–23:12	1.29 mi (2.08 km)	50 yd (46 m)
EFU	A brief tornado remained over open farmland, not impacting any structures.						
EF3	W of Fryburg to Lakeview to SSW of West Mansfield	Auglaize, Logan	OH	40.5193°N 84.1664°W	23:29–00:16	31.33 mi (50.42 km)	1,000 yd (910 m)
EF3	3 deaths – See article on this tornado – Twenty-seven people were injured. This was the third tornado produced by the Lakeview supercell.						
EF1	S of Mt. Cory to SW of Jenera	Hancock	OH	40.8763°N 83.8087°W	23:30–23:34	3.34 mi (5.38 km)	100 yd (91 m)
EF1	Several homes and outbuildings were damaged.						
EF2	ENE of Muncie to Selma to SSW of Parker City	Delaware	IN	40.203°N 85.3173°W	23:34–23:40	4.47 mi (7.19 km)	175 yd (160 m)
EF2	A strong tornado passed through Selma. Manufactured homes and outbuildings were heavily damaged or destroyed, several homes suffered extensive damage, including some that had roofs torn off, and trees and utility poles were snapped. This storm would produce the Winchester EF3 tornado 10 minutes later.						
EF3	S of Farmland, IN to Southern Winchester, IN to N of Covington, OH	Randolph (IN), Darke (OH), Miami (OH)	IN, OH	40.1785°N 85.1251°W	23:50–01:00	41.34 mi (66.53 km)	700 yd (640 m)
EF3	1 death – See section on this tornado – Thirty-nine people were injured.						
EF2	ENE of New Washington to W of Shiloh	Crawford, Richland	OH	40.977°N 82.8358°W	23:54–00:13	10.29 mi (16.56 km)	250 yd (230 m)
EF2	Trees, power poles and homes were damaged in Auburn Township. The tornado then intensified, damaging multiple residences and outbuildings southwest of Plymouth. A single-wide manufactured home and an outbuilding were destroyed. The tornado then steadily weakened as it passed south of Plymouth, damaging homes and outbuildings, including one outbuilding that collapsed, and snapping trees and power poles before dissipating near Shiloh.						
EF0	Northern Frisco	Collin	TX	33.19°N 96.81°W	23:59–00:00	0.2 mi (0.32 km)	15 yd (14 m)
EF0	A brief tornado formed on the University of North Texas Frisco campus, damaging a few signs and shifting a car. The tornado exited campus and uprooted some young trees before dissipating.						
EF2	NW of Raymond to Broadway to NE of Ostrander	Union, Delaware	OH	40.3718°N 83.5251°W	00:24–00:52	19.48 mi (31.35 km)	600 yd (550 m)
EF2	This strong tornado touched down soon after the Lakeview EF3 tornado dissipated, becoming the fourth tornado produced by this supercell. It quickly strengthened and damaged several homes. A modular home was completely destroyed, with parts of it thrown downstream nearly half a mile. Another home lost a majority of its roof and had its exterior wall collapsed. More roof damage to homes and barns was observed, as well as considerable tree damage. The tornado then entered Delaware County, producing EF1 damage before dissipating.						
EF1	N of Mount Vernon	Jefferson	IL	38.3445°N 88.9175°W	00:32–00:33	0.5 mi (0.80 km)	150 yd (140 m)
EF1	Two metal buildings had most of their roofs removed and all their garage bay doors blown out. The buildings' exterior walls were partially removed. Several buses inside sustained significant damage from debris. Building material was pulverized and embedded in the ground and walls of buildings downwind. A nearby metal building also sustained roof damage. A few large hardwood trees were also uprooted.						
EF2	Hot Springs Village	Garland, Saline	AR	34.6397°N 93.0587°W	00:57–01:19	8.53 mi (13.73 km)	1,000 yd (910 m)
EF2	This large tornado formed just north of the Mountain Valley community along AR 7 where wooden utility poles were snapped, indicating EF2 strength with winds around 115 mph (185 km/h). It continued into Hot Springs Village, causing extensive tree damage consistent with EF2 winds, including snapped trunks and uprooted trees. In this area, homes were primarily damaged by falling trees rather than direct tornado winds. Beyond this point, the roof of a building along the bluff was blown off and thrown approximately 80 yd (73 m) to the northeast. The tornado began to weaken after this point, showing mainly EF1-level tree damage before lifting.						
EF1	S of Delaware to S of Sunbury to S of St. Louisville	Delaware, Licking	OH	40.2599°N 83.0678°W	01:01–01:50	35.38 mi (56.94 km)	600 yd (550 m)
EF1	A long-tracked EF1 tornado, the fifth and last tornado produced by the Lakeview supercell, developed on the west side of US 23, initially causing minor and sporadic tree damage. After crossing US 23 the tornado widened and began causing more structural damage, as houses were damaged, and barns were destroyed. The Olentangy Berlin High School sustained damage to parts of the school campus and athletic fields. Several transmission towers were felled nearby. The tornado then moved into neighborhoods southwest of Sunbury and west of Galena, causing widespread and significant tree damage and blowing out windows. Roofs were also partially removed, and power poles were snapped in the area. Galena itself sustained straight-line wind with embedded tornadic damage. More homes were damaged, and barns were destroyed before the tornado dissipated near SR 13.						
EF1	NE of Fairfield to NNW of Golden Gate	Wayne	IL	38.408°N 88.282°W	01:11–01:15	2.8 mi (4.5 km)	75 yd (69 m)
EF1	A tornado inflicted roof damage to a home as soon as it formed. Moving east, an anchored mobile home was lifted and tipped over, sustaining major damage. Another home northeast of the mobile home had significant soffit and porch damage. An old TV tower was toppled on the property. Numerous pine trees were snapped along the tornado's path.						
EF0	SE of Raymond	Breckinridge	KY	37.9278°N 86.3549°W	03:32–03:33	0.46 mi (0.74 km)	20 yd (18 m)
EF0	A brief tornado overturned a small wood shed and a pile of aluminum housing trim was scattered. Several dead trees were uprooted as well.						
EF1	N of Broken Bow	McCurtain	OK	34.1096°N 94.7424°W	04:00–04:01	0.47 mi (0.76 km)	200 yd (180 m)
EF1	Trees and buildings were damaged by this QLCS tornado. Two homes suffered varying degrees of damage and some outbuildings were severely damaged. There was also roof damage observed to a single-family home and a hotel.						

=== March 15 event ===
List of confirmed tornadoes – Friday, March 15, 2024
EF#	Location	County / Parish	State	Start Coord.	Time (UTC)	Path length	Max width
EF1	New Albany	Union	MS	34.4954°N 89.017°W	08:13–08:15	0.85 mi (1.37 km)	150 yd (140 m)
EF1	A tornado developed in New Albany causing intermittent tree damage. The tornado crossed the Little Tallahatchie River and moved into downtown where the police station was damaged. Deeper into town, numerous trees and structures were damaged, with the most significant damage being observed at the county clerk's office. The tornado caused additional roof damage before dissipating.						
EF0	Southern Belvidere	Franklin	TN	35.1225°N 86.1935°W	09:38–09:39	0.31 mi (0.50 km)	20 yd (18 m)
EF0	This tornado snapped and uprooted a few trees on a farm before striking a neighboring building, where a number of small, unsecured manufactured barns were shifted and one was toppled.						
EF1	NE of Caledonia	Lowndes	MS	33.7102°N 88.293°W	10:04–10:09	2.05 mi (3.30 km)	200 yd (180 m)
EF1	Trees were damaged and downed. Several outbuildings and the roof of a single family home sustained damage and a mobile home lost much of its roof.						
EF0	NNW of Steens	Lowndes	MS	33.607°N 88.3313°W	10:07–10:08	0.64 mi (1.03 km)	75 yd (69 m)
EF0	A brief tornado damaged the roof of a home, a carport and a few trees.						
EF0	NW of Lakeview	DeKalb	AL	34.4187°N 85.9763°W	11:53–11:54	0.19 mi (0.31 km)	77 yd (70 m)
EF0	Roof panels were peeled off of a chicken house. A pole barn was pushed over and another barn sustained roof damage.						
EF1	SW of Rochelle	McCulloch	TX	31.1734°N 99.2324°W	14:07–14:09	0.02 mi (0.032 km)	10 yd (9.1 m)
EF1	A metal barn was thrown onto a neighboring barn.						
EFU	SE of Pearlington	Hancock	MS	30.2°N 89.54°W	18:35–18:37	0.6 mi (0.97 km)	75 yd (69 m)
EFU	A brief tornado crossed the Pearl River on the Louisiana state line. A CSX bridge tender reported a snapped pine tree and railroad signs knocked over, but no damage could be found, and no rating could be applied.						

=== March 19 event ===
List of confirmed tornadoes – Tuesday, March 19, 2024
EF#	Location	County / Parish	State	Start Coord.	Time (UTC)	Path length	Max width
EF0	Little Torch Key	Monroe	FL	24.6756°N 81.3952°W	08:01–08:02	0.26 mi (0.42 km)	20 yd (18 m)
EF0	A brief tornado downed trees, broke branches, destroyed a plastic shed, and destroyed shade canopies.						

=== March 24 event ===
List of confirmed tornadoes – Sunday, March 24, 2024
EF#	Location	County / Parish	State	Start Coord.	Time (UTC)	Path length	Max width
EFU	SSW of Farnsworth	Ochiltree	TX	36.1773°N 100.9957°W	19:43–19:45	0.73 mi (1.17 km)	30 yd (27 m)
EFU	A tornado was photographed and filmed by multiple people. It remained over an open field, and no known damage occurred.						
EF1	S of Perryton	Ochiltree	TX	36.3312°N 100.8071°W	19:58–20:11	1.59 mi (2.56 km)	100 yd (91 m)
EF1	To the west of US 83, this high-end EF1 tornado snapped three power poles and overturned a portion of an irrigation pivot. Moving northeastward, the tornado crossed US 83, destroying much of the roof of a roundtop quonset. It then threw mud on several power poles and deposited debris in fields before dissipating.						
EF0	Southern Perryton	Ochiltree	TX	36.3605°N 100.7945°W	20:05–20:07	0.72 mi (1.16 km)	30 yd (27 m)
EF0	This tornado touched down as the mesocyclone that produced the previous tornado occluded. A barn suffered minor roof damage and had a door blown out, and the Ochiltree Hospital also suffered minor roof damage before the tornado dissipated.						
EF1	NW of Shamrock	Wheeler	TX	35.231°N 100.2652°W	20:17–20:18	0.18 mi (0.29 km)	25 yd (23 m)
EF1	A funnel cloud passed over I-40 before touching down briefly north of it. It struck the Dalton O’Gorman Rodeo Arena, ripping a large section of the eastern half of the roof off the building while also knocking down a south-facing wall. The tornado quickly dissipated after that.						
EF1	Eastern Garden City	Finney	KS	37.97°N 100.83°W	20:30–20:55	2.5 mi (4.0 km)	50 yd (46 m)
EF1	This weak tornado developed on the southeast side of Garden City and tracked north, producing high-end EF0 to low-end EF1 roof damage to homes and businesses.						
EFU	WSW of Grinnell	Gove	KS	39.0944°N 100.7298°W	22:05–22:11	1.31 mi (2.11 km)	100 yd (91 m)
EFU	A landspout was photographed multiple times south of I-70.						
EFU	SE of Oakley	Gove	KS	39.0852°N 100.7604°W	22:11–22:19	1.84 mi (2.96 km)	100 yd (91 m)
EFU	A landspout was captured on video by KDOT cameras on I-70. No damage occurred.						
EFU	NNW of Mabelle	Wilbarger	TX	33.854°N 99.211°W	22:27	0.5 mi (0.80 km)	30 yd (27 m)
EFU	Several storm chasers observed a brief tornado.						

=== March 25 event ===
List of confirmed tornadoes – Monday, March 25, 2024
EF#	Location	County / Parish	State	Start Coord.	Time (UTC)	Path length	Max width
EF1	NW of Clinton to W of Ridgeland	Hinds, Madison	MS	32.3757°N 90.3705°W	01:08–01:16	8.51 mi (13.70 km)	880 yd (800 m)
EF1	This large, fast-moving tornado touched down in rural areas near Clinton, snapping and uprooting hundreds of trees along its path, before dissipating just after crossing into Madison County.						

=== March 26 event ===
List of confirmed tornadoes – Tuesday, March 26, 2024
EF#	Location	County / Parish	State	Start Coord.	Time (UTC)	Path length	Max width
EFU	NNW of Aurora	Sevier	UT	38.95°N 111.95°W	18:15	Unknown	Unknown
EFU	A tornado was photographed making brief contact with the ground.						
EFU	NNE of Pueblo West	Pueblo	CO	38.3902°N 104.7076°W	23:35–23:37	0.18 mi (0.29 km)	10 yd (9.1 m)
EFU	A weak landspout occurred in an open field.						
EF0	W of Davenport	Lincoln	WA	47.6507°N 118.2383°W	01:45–01:55	0.18 mi (0.29 km)	10 yd (9.1 m)
EF0	A storm spotter observed a weak tornado.						

== See also ==
- Tornadoes of 2024
- List of European tornadoes in 2024
- List of United States tornadoes from September to December 2023
- List of United States tornadoes in April 2024
