= January 8–10, 2024 North American storm complex =

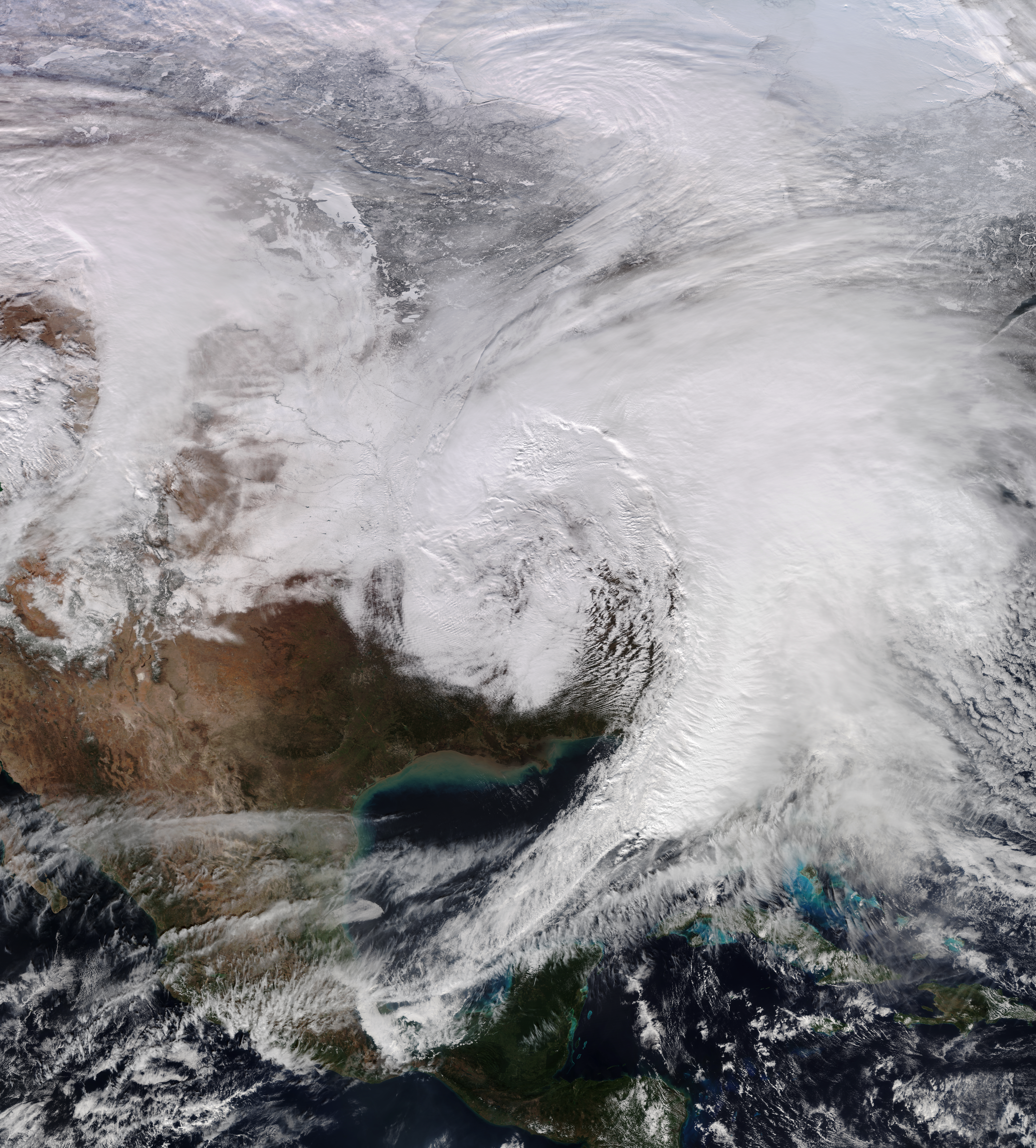
- Mid-latitude cyclone responsible for the storm complex on January 9, 2024

Meteorological history
- Formed: January 7, 2024
- Dissipated: January 12, 2024

Category 1 "Notable" winter storm
- Regional snowfall index: 2.38 (NOAA)
- Max. snowfall: 21 in (53 cm) in Wolf Creek Pass

Tornado outbreak
- Tornadoes: 38
- Max. rating: EF3 tornado
- Duration: January 8–9, 2024
- Highest winds: 102 mph (164 km/h) (highest convective wind)

Overall effects
- Fatalities: 6 (2 tornadic)
- Injuries: 14+ (14+ tornadic)
- Damage: $2.7 billion (2024 USD)
- Areas affected: Northwestern, Midwestern, and Southern United States
- Part of the tornadoes and tornado outbreaks of 2024 and 2023–24 North American winter

A large and robust storm system, unofficially named Winter Storm Finn by The Weather Channel, brought widespread impacts to much of the contiguous United States early in January 2024. In the northern United States, heavy snow, hail, and gusty winds affected areas from the Great Plains to New England. In the southern United States, a widespread tornado outbreak along the Gulf Coast caused two fatalities and numerous injuries.

== Meteorological synopsis ==
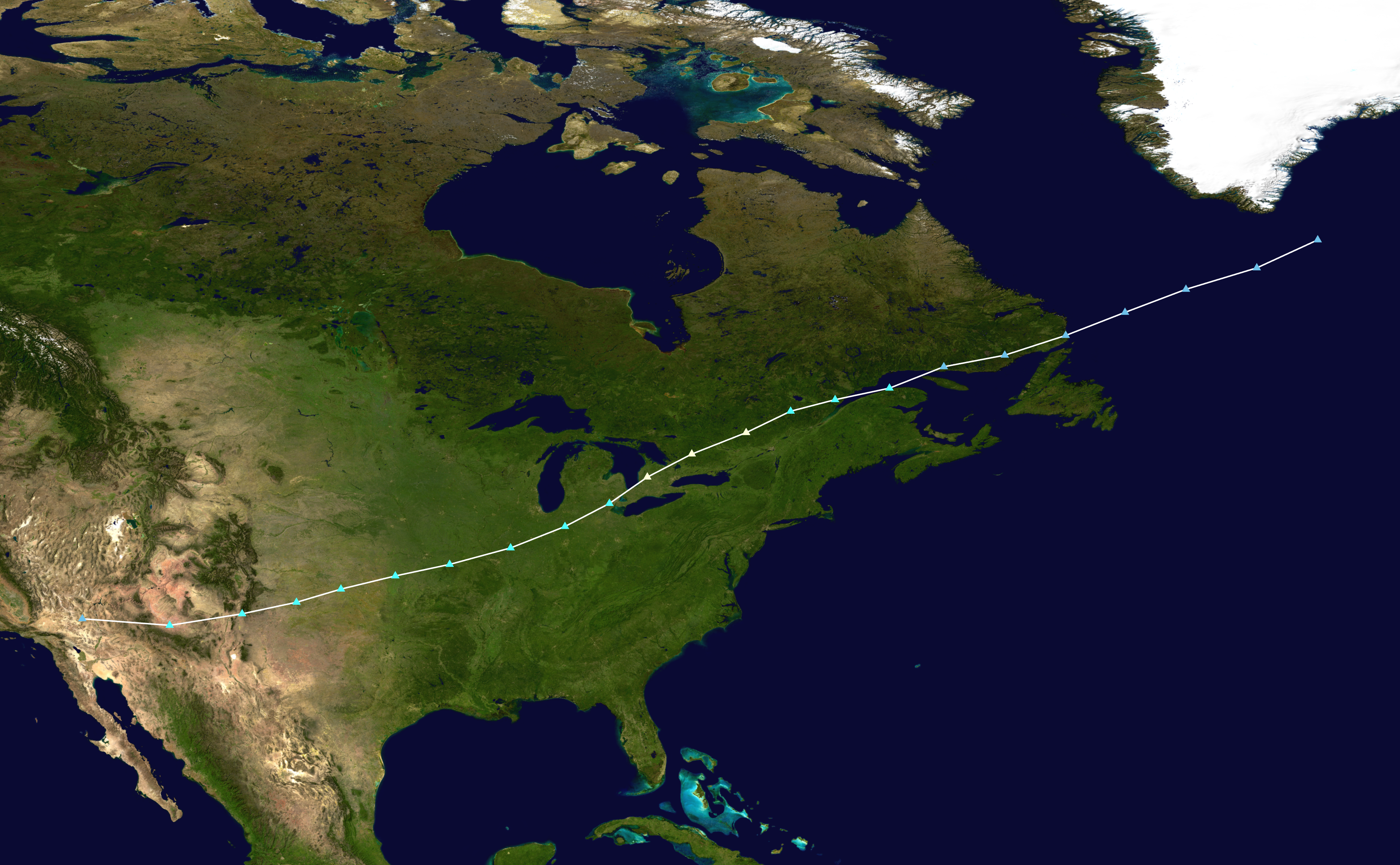
Map plotting the storm's track and intensity, according to the Saffir–Simpson scale Map key Saffir–Simpson scale Tropical depression (≤38 mph, ≤62 km/h) Tropical storm (39–73 mph, 63–118 km/h) Category 1 (74–95 mph, 119–153 km/h) Category 2 (96–110 mph, 154–177 km/h) Category 3 (111–129 mph, 178–208 km/h) Category 4 (130–156 mph, 209–251 km/h) Category 5 (≥157 mph, ≥252 km/h) Unknown Storm type Tropical cyclone Subtropical cyclone Extratropical cyclone, remnant low, tropical disturbance, or monsoon depression

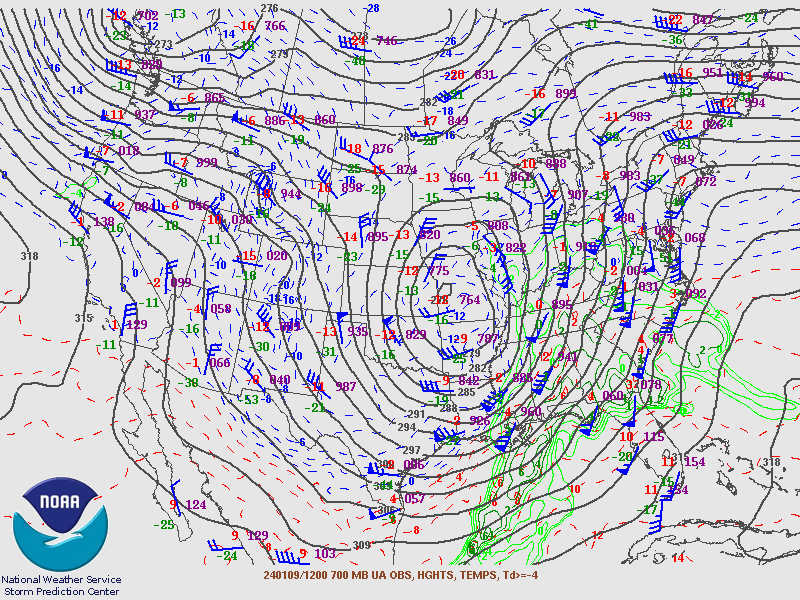
The large trough seen across the United States on January 9, 2024

On January 2, 2024, meteorologists from the Storm Prediction Center began tracking a large upper-level trough forecast to move across the United States, with multiple embedded shortwave perturbations. By January 4, evidence of strong surface cyclogenesis pointed towards an intensifying and negatively tilted trough in the south, with a strong surface-low response to the north. These elements were conducive to strong thunderstorms across the country, with intensifying winter storm potential across the north and discrete supercell formation in the southeast. By January 5 as forecast, a powerful winter storm formed in the Gulf of Alaska from the trough, which dove southwards through British Columbia and the Western United States. The now mid-latitude cyclone then moved eastwards, bringing blizzard conditions to the Rocky Mountains and Great Plains on January 7. Six states recorded whiteout conditions during this time. The storm continued to intensify and further severe weather in the east was forecast—more specifically, strong shortwaves from the initial trough were predicted to become robust and affect the south-southeast portions of the United States, as well as create wind-threats for the east coast.

During the early morning hours of January 8, a powerful mid-level shortwave trough was observed moving east across the Sangre de Cristo Mountains. This feature initiated blizzard conditions and heavy snow across Southeast Colorado, the Raton Mesa of northeast New Mexico and far western Kansas. As the storm moved east on January 8 and 9th, the cyclone remained negatively tilted, and formed a tornado outbreak in the Deep South, whilst portions of Indiana recorded record low pressure. Strong mid-level to low-level flow contributed to extreme weather, allowing storms to mature at the mesoscale, with strong moisture return near the coast, and CAPE values in excess of 500-1000 j/kg. The strongest tornado from the outbreak formed near the coast of Panama City, FL, moving on shore and producing EF3 damage.

As the storm moved into the Northeastern United States on January 9, heavy rain and flooding occurred, with snow falling in Northern New England. Freezing conditions were reported, as well as extreme wind and snow. The system moved northward into Canada on January 10.

== Impact ==
Across the United States, over 600,000 customers lost power and 7,000 flights were cancelled.

=== Western United States ===
Due to the winter storm in the Sierra Nevada, chains were required for driving on I-80 and US 50. I-80 was also briefly closed. In Reno, Nevada, around 27,000 customers briefly lost power. Heavy snow also fell in Coconino County, Arizona, with Forest Lakes receiving 14 in (36 cm) of snow. Portions of I-40 and SR 89A shut down due to the snow.

On January 7, in Colorado, I-70 was closed from Watkins, Colorado to the Kansas state line due to the storm. High winds were also reported in the region, with winds in Colorado gusted up to 80 mph (130 km/h), while winds in the state of New Mexico reached 76 mph (122 km/h). Snowfall totals in the state of Colorado reached up to 21 in (53 cm) in Wolf Creek Pass.

=== Midwest ===
As the storm continued on January 8, many highways were closed in Kansas, including significant portions of I-70, K-4, K-149, K-15 and US 56. Visibility in Kansas due to the blizzard dropped as low as 15 feet (4.6 m). Portions of I-80 in Nebraska also closed due to the snowfall. Blizzard conditions also occurred in the Texas Panhandle, where 4 in (10 cm) of snow fell in Dalhart and winds gusted up to 70 mph (110 km/h). Further south, the storm resulted in a leak at NRG Stadium before the 2024 College Football Playoff National Championship.

Record snowfall fell in Des Moines on January 9, with 8.3 in (21 cm) of snow, with the event total being 11.2 in (28 cm). Portions of Iowa recorded 15 in (38 cm) of snow. Snow was lighter in the Chicago metropolitan area, with a peak of around 3.5 in (8.9 cm); the snowfall resulted in a ground stop at Chicago O'Hare International Airport. Slushy roads led to two fatalities in the Midwest – one in Wisconsin and one in Michigan.

=== Northeast ===
The storm resulted in flooding across the Northeastern US. The Delaware River in Philadelphia exceeded its all time crest record. The severe storms also produced over 4 in (100 mm) of rain in spots. The storm resulted in 110,000 customers losing power in New York, 70,000 customers losing power in Pennsylvania, 56,000 customers losing power in New Jersey, and 28,000 customers losing power in Maine. Dozens of Amtrak trains were cancelled due to the storm. An evacuation order was briefly issued along the Yantic River in Norwich, Connecticut due to a partial dam failure from the heavy rain. The National Park Service shut down parts of Fire Island National Seashore due to flooding. Flooding also resulted in Lodi Public Schools canceling school on January 10. At the Blue Hill Observatory, 2.88 in (73 mm) of rain fell, of which 0.61 in (15 mm) occurred in a single hour. High winds also affected the Northeast, with a peak gust of 95 mph (153 km/h) at Isle au Haut, Maine. Parts of Acadia National Park closed due to the storm, and the park suffered heavy damage. Reid State Park in Maine was also shut down due to the storm. Western New York was hit hard by high winds, with winds gusting to 74 mph (119 km/h) in Dunkirk and 78 mph (126 km/h) in Watertown; the National Weather Service's Buffalo office warned in an Area Forecast Discussion that gusts from the southeast descending from Tug Hill could reach "potentially generational" levels.

== Tornado outbreak ==
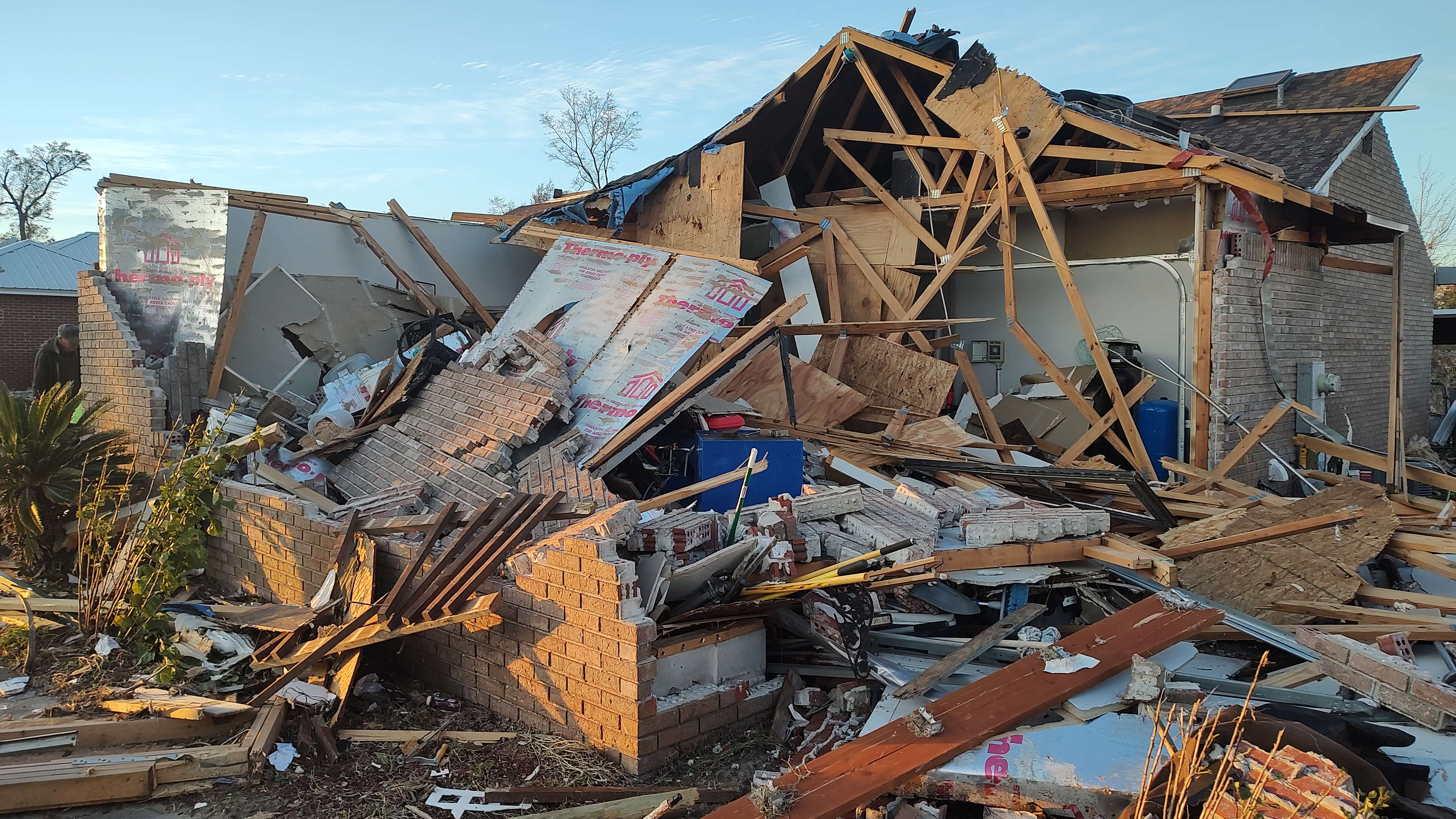
High-end EF2 damage to a home northeast of Lynn Haven, Florida

Severe weather tore through the southeastern United States on January 8 into January 9, resulting in 4 fatalities, with 2 of them being tornadic: one each in Alabama and North Carolina. Additional non-tornadic fatalities occurred in the states of Alabama and Georgia. The first January EF3 or stronger tornado in Florida history occurred. The tornado outbreak led to a ground stops at Orlando International Airport.

=== Confirmed tornadoes ===
Confirmed tornadoes by Enhanced Fujita rating
EFU	EF0	EF1	EF2	EF3	EF4	EF5	Total
0	16	15	6	1	0	0	38

==== January 8 event ====
List of confirmed tornadoes – Monday, January 8, 2024 (Note: All dates are based on the local time zone where the tornado touched down; however, all times are in Coordinated Universal Time for consistency.)
EF#	Location	County / Parish	State	Start Coord.	Time (UTC)	Path length	Max width
EF0	Supreme	Assumption	LA	29.85°N 90.99°W	21:42–21:43	0.88 mi (1.42 km)	200 yd (180 m)
EF0	A brief high-end EF0 tornado caused damage in Supreme. A poorly-anchored and frail mobile home was tossed into a fire station building and a few other mobile homes had their roofs damaged. Tree and power pole damage also occurred.						
EF0	NW of Agricola	George	MS	30.8358°N 88.5724°W	01:25–01:27	2.09 mi (3.36 km)	20 yd (18 m)
EF0	A weak tornado moved across open fields, uprooting some small softwood trees.						
EF0	SW of Lucedale	George	MS	30.8681°N 88.6267°W	01:31–01:32	0.19 mi (0.31 km)	20 yd (18 m)
EF0	A frame home and mobile home sustained minor damage from a brief tornado.						

==== January 9 event ====
List of confirmed tornadoes – Tuesday, January 9, 2024
EF#	Location	County / Parish	State	Start Coord.	Time (UTC)	Path length	Max width
EF0	W of Eglin Air Force Base	Santa Rosa	FL	30.4986°N 87.0123°W	08:29–08:34	1.74 mi (2.80 km)	150 yd (140 m)
EF0	This tornado developed over the Escribano Point Wildlife Management Area and moved through wooded areas, snapping trees and tree branches. A wooden sign was ripped out of the ground as well.						
EF1	NNW of Shipman	George	MS	30.9028°N 88.4892°W	09:24–09:25	0.21 mi (0.34 km)	30 yd (27 m)
EF1	Several pine trees were snapped three to fifteen feet (0.9 to 5 m) above ground level as a result of this brief tornado.						
EF0	ESE of Tanner Williams	Mobile	AL	30.7035°N 88.3304°W	09:47–09:51	2.99 mi (4.81 km)	20 yd (18 m)
EF0	Minor tree damage occurred along the path of this tornado.						
EF0	Western Mobile	Mobile	AL	30.6396°N 88.2435°W	09:56–09:58	1.48 mi (2.38 km)	20 yd (18 m)
EF0	A weak tornado touched down in the western part of Mobile, where a business sustained roof damage, a brick wall was knocked over, and fencing was downed. An RV was rolled and trees were downed as well.						
EF0	NE of Coden	Mobile	AL	30.4046°N 88.1839°W	10:12–10:14	0.66 mi (1.06 km)	30 yd (27 m)
EF0	A few trees were uprooted and minor vegetation damage occurred.						
EF1	Santa Rosa Beach to SSE of Freeport	Walton	FL	30.346°N 86.2317°W	10:29–10:39	10.93 mi (17.59 km)	220 yd (200 m)
EF1	A tornadic waterspout formed over the Gulf of Mexico and moved ashore at Santa Rosa Beach, where roofs were damaged, trees were downed, and a weather station recorded a 106 mile-per-hour wind gust. The tornado crossed Choctawhatchee Bay and moved ashore again south of Freeport, partially unroofing a few homes and snapping trees before dissipating.						
EF1	ENE of Spanish Fort to SSE of Stapleton	Baldwin	AL	30.6953°N 87.8192°W	10:32–10:35	1.85 mi (2.98 km)	230 yd (210 m)
EF1	This tornado tore sections of roofing off of multiple homes and downed trees. Fencing was damaged and knocked over as well.						
EF1	SSE of Stapleton	Baldwin	AL	30.6971°N 87.7751°W	10:35–10:36	0.26 mi (0.42 km)	50 yd (46 m)
EF1	This brief tornado formed as the previous tornado was dissipating, snapping and uprooting numerous trees.						
EF0	ENE of Fairhope to N of Silverhill	Baldwin	AL	30.5537°N 87.8361°W	10:38–10:45	5.08 mi (8.18 km)	20 yd (18 m)
EF0	Tree limbs were downed and some trees were uprooted by this weak tornado.						
EF1	SSE of Eucheeanna	Walton	FL	30.5872°N 86.0243°W	10:48–10:55	5.42 mi (8.72 km)	160 yd (150 m)
EF1	A mobile home was damaged, an open air shed collapsed, and trees were snapped or uprooted by this brief tornado.						
EF0	E of Ponce de Leon	Holmes	FL	30.7121°N 85.8679°W	11:03–11:08	0.96 mi (1.54 km)	100 yd (91 m)
EF0	Trees were downed, some of which landed on vehicles, homes, and other structures.						
EF3	Lower Grand Lagoon to Western Panama City	Bay	FL	30.1384°N 85.7526°W	11:31–11:37	5.2 mi (8.4 km)	550 yd (500 m)
EF3	A powerful tornadic waterspout formed over the Gulf of Mexico and moved onshore at Panama City Beach, striking Lower Grand Lagoon. A beachfront home was leveled after it was ripped from its raised wooden pier foundation, a three-story home was tipped over and left leaning against a neighboring house, and multiple other homes and condominiums had roofs and exterior walls torn off. A small breakfast restaurant collapsed, other businesses were damaged, and multiple apartment buildings were unroofed and sustained collapse of numerous second floor walls. Power poles were snapped, boats were tossed around, and several large metal boat storage warehouses were severely damaged at Pirate's Cove Marina, one of which was left with its structural beams severely mangled. The tornado then weakened as it struck Upper Grand Lagoon, causing less intense damage to some homes and a metal building. It continued across St. Andrews Bay and moved back onshore in the western part of Panama City. Several homes had roof and exterior damage, a business lost a large section of its roof, and a large truck was overturned in this area before the tornado dissipated. The tornado caused $15.35 million (2024 USD) in damage.						
EF0	St. Andrews State Park	Bay	FL	30.1322°N 85.7452°W	11:31–11:32	0.23 mi (0.37 km)	50 yd (46 m)
EF0	A satellite tornado of the Lower Grand Lagoon EF3 tornado moved ashore, damaging an antenna and some tree limbs.						
EF2	Lynn Haven to NNW of Youngstown	Bay	FL	30.2403°N 85.6419°W	11:43–11:55	12.89 mi (20.74 km)	600 yd (550 m)
EF2	After the Lower Grand Lagoon EF3 tornado dissipated, the same supercell produced this tornado that touched down in Lynn Haven, initially downing trees and causing minor roof damage in town. It strengthened to high-end EF2 intensity as it moved to the northeast and impacted neighborhoods along the shores of Deer Point Lake, where several frame homes had roof and exterior wall loss, and one house had its entire second story removed. Mobile homes were heavily damaged or destroyed, one of which was ripped from its anchors and thrown into a tree. An RV, a metal storage shed, and multiple garages were destroyed as well. The tornado then weakened as it moved to the northeast, inflicting less intense damage to houses and mobile homes and snapping many trees before it dissipated near Youngstown.						
EF1	SSE of Dothan	Houston	AL	31.135°N 85.3554°W	11:53–11:55	1.2 mi (1.9 km)	225 yd (206 m)
EF1	Several homes sustained roof damage and many trees were snapped.						
EF1	N of Fountain to SE of Alford	Bay, Calhoun, Jackson	FL	30.5135°N 85.3949°W	12:03–12:19	9.79 mi (15.76 km)	450 yd (410 m)
EF1	Many trees were snapped or uprooted as this tornado moved through wooded areas. A few homes and mobile homes had roof damage, and several barns and small sheds were damaged as well.						
EF2	S of Marianna to ESE of Bascom	Jackson	FL	30.71°N 85.2276°W	12:25–12:43	16.33 mi (26.28 km)	600 yd (550 m)
EF2	This strong tornado formed south of Marianna and crossed I-10, where a semi-truck was flipped and numerous trees were snapped or uprooted, one of which fell on and destroyed a mobile home. Several other mobile homes and a frame home had roofing torn off in this area as well. The tornado then damaged the roof of a shed before it strengthened and crossed US 90 at the southeastern outskirts of Marianna, where it struck an RV park. Many RVs were thrown and destroyed at this location, and a few smaller permanent buildings were destroyed as well. A nearby pawn shop was partially unroofed, a gas station was damaged, and some metal storage buildings had their doors blown in and roofs peeled back in this area as well. A church near the RV park had damage to its gables, and a large cinder-block outbuilding on the property collapsed. The tornado then moved through a residential area, where multiple frame homes had their roofs torn off and a few suffered some collapse of exterior walls. Additional frame homes were heavily damaged in the Blue Spring subdivision farther to the northeast, where one home was largely destroyed and a car was flipped. The tornado weakened as it continued through rural areas to the northeast of Marianna, where the roof of a church collapsed, a couple of barns were damaged or destroyed, several mobile homes had minor damage, and many trees were snapped or uprooted. The tornado dissipated near Bascom. Seven people were injured at the RV park.						
EF1	Western DeFuniak Springs	Walton	FL	30.7333°N 86.1565°W	13:06–13:07	0.35 mi (0.56 km)	200 yd (180 m)
EF1	A tornado struck the DeFuniak Springs Airport, where a few airplane hangars were damaged. A business had its metal roof blown off, a metal carport was destroyed, and fencing was toppled. Many trees were snapped or uprooted.						
EF0	Eastern Palmetto	Fulton	GA	33.5242°N 84.6442°W	13:12–13:13	1.56 mi (2.51 km)	75 yd (69 m)
EF0	A tornado downed trees and overturned semi-truck trailers at a warehouse.						
EF2	NNW of Chipley, FL to Cottonwood, AL to NW of Gordon, AL	Jackson (FL), Houston (AL)	FL, AL	30.8676°N 85.5799°W	13:50–14:22	34.76 mi (55.94 km)	1,000 yd (910 m)
EF2	1 death – See section on this tornado – Four people were injured.						
EF0	SW of Alford	Washington	FL	30.65°N 85.45°W	13:59–14:00	0.89 mi (1.43 km)	50 yd (46 m)
EF0	Tree damage occurred.						
EF2	Callaway	Bay	FL	30.1417°N 85.5907°W	14:03–14:05	0.88 mi (1.42 km)	150 yd (140 m)
EF2	A brief, but strong low-end EF2 tornado heavily damaged or ripped the roofs off of three homes in Callaway. A manufactured home was also damaged.						
EF2	S of Arlington to NE of Morgan	Early, Calhoun	GA	31.3785°N 84.7285°W	14:46–15:07	21.73 mi (34.97 km)	800 yd (730 m)
EF2	A strong tornado touched down and passed near Arlington, overturning several center-pivot irrigation systems and completely destroying a small, unreinforced concrete block home. A two-story home in this area was shifted off its foundation, a new brick home suffered major roof damage, and a house at the edge of the damage path had minor damage. Numerous trees were snapped as the tornado moved to the northeast near Morgan, and a railroad crossing gate along US 82 was damaged. It then crossed SR 234, causing roof damage to a frame home, damaging a double-wide mobile home, destroying a small outbuilding, and overturning some additional irrigation systems before dissipating.						
EF0	E of Callaway	Leon	FL	30.3879°N 84.5895°W	15:32–15:34	0.96 mi (1.54 km)	50 yd (46 m)
EF0	A weak tornado damaged trees in the Apalachicola National Forest.						
EF1	E of Newton to N of Catawba	Catawba, Iredell	NC	35.657°N 81.157°W	17:27–17:36	9.02 mi (14.52 km)	250 yd (230 m)
EF1	1 death – This high-end EF1 tornado touched down in Catawba County south of Claremont, breaking branches and uprooting large trees. As it tracked northeastward, it reached its peak intensity as it hit the Fox Hollow subdivision at the east edge of Claremont, seriously damaging numerous manufactured homes, a few of which were mostly destroyed. One person was killed when a mobile home was rolled and four others were injured, two of them seriously. The tornado crossed the Catawba River into Iredell County, where it snapped numerous trees. It dissipated after it crossed I-40.						
EF1	W of Nicholls to NW of Alma	Coffee, Bacon	GA	31.5166°N 82.6644°W	17:55–18:05	7.27 mi (11.70 km)	400 yd (370 m)
EF1	The tornado began near SR 32 and moved northeastward, tracking across areas north of Nicholls. Barns and outbuildings were heavily damaged or destroyed, a mobile home had its porch roof torn off, and many trees were snapped or uprooted, one of which landed on and damaged a pump house. A metal power pole was partially bent over, a flag pole was snapped, a yard tractor was tossed, and an empty semi-truck trailer was overturned. A manufactured home was severely damaged and had its carport torn off shortly before the tornado dissipated.						
EF1	SSE of Bellville to S of Claxton	Evans	GA	32.1399°N 81.9121°W	18:43–18:50	4.78 mi (7.69 km)	200 yd (180 m)
EF1	Hundreds of trees were uprooted or snapped by this tornado, and a large metal outbuilding was damaged. A boat stored inside the outbuilding was moved. A center-pivot irrigation system and shed were also largely destroyed.						
EF1	SW of Lake Murray of Richland	Lexington	SC	34.0518°N 81.3548°W	19:10–19:16	3.27 mi (5.26 km)	150 yd (140 m)
EF1	Numerous trees were uprooted or snapped. One person suffered minor injuries when a large tree fell onto the roof of a home.						
EF2	Bamberg	Bamberg	SC	33.2729°N 81.0435°W	19:46–19:48	2.14 mi (3.44 km)	500 yd (460 m)
EF2	This strong tornado moved directly through downtown Bamberg, where multiple historic but frail brick buildings suffered major structural damage. The upper floors of several of the buildings were completely destroyed, and multiple front walls collapsed outward, leaving streets in downtown Bamberg covered in bricks and masonry. A barrel factory also sustained major damage, including collapse of multiple walls and a large section of its roof. Debris from the barrel factory was thrown into the town's water tower, while a dumpster and pieces of heavy equipment near the facility were tossed. A small, poorly built home on stilts collapsed, other homes in town had roof and window damage, and a mobile home was rolled into a tree. A metal garage building was unroofed and had its doors blown out, the Bamberg County Magistrate Office had minor roof damage, and a semi-trailer was overturned. Siding was torn off a Hardee's, and many trees were snapped or uprooted in town.						
EF1	NW of Westchase	Hillsborough	FL	28.1061°N 82.6458°W	21:00–21:02	0.58 mi (0.93 km)	75 yd (69 m)
EF1	A number of homes in a subdivision had their screened-in pool enclosures damaged or destroyed, and trees and tree limbs were snapped.						
EF0	SSW of Bayard	Duval	FL	30.125°N 81.5317°W	21:08–21:10	0.23 mi (370 m)	30 yd (27 m)
EF0	A brief tornado touched down within the Jacksonville metropolitan area. Several homes had their rain gutters and window screens damaged, and several trees and large limbs were knocked down.						
EF0	St. Petersburg	Pinellas	FL	29.7528°N 82.6401°W	21:23–21:24	0.01 mi (16 m)	10 yd (9.1 m)
EF0	An apartment building had some of its roofing material blown off as a result of this very brief, weak tornado.						
EF1	N of New Bern	Craven	NC	35.196°N 77.0561°W	01:03–01:11	5.02 mi (8.08 km)	125 yd (114 m)
EF1	An agricultural building had metal roofing torn off, while a house and an outbuilding sustained shingle damage. Multiple trees were snapped along the path as well.						
EF1	Harkers Island (1st tornado)	Carteret	NC	34.6933°N 76.5592°W	02:09–02:11	0.23 mi (0.37 km)	75 yd (69 m)
EF1	This tornado, which occurred simultaneously with the tornado listed below, likely originated as a tornadic waterspout over Back Sound before moving inland. A house suffered major roof damage and had one of its exterior walls blown out, while a wooden 2x4 was speared through the front wall of another house that had its windows shattered. Several other homes sustained minor roof shingle damage, a power pole was snapped, and a metal storage shed was lofted and thrown.						
EF0	Harkers Island (2nd tornado)	Carteret	NC	34.6982°N 76.579°W	02:09–02:13	0.14 mi (0.23 km)	60 yd (55 m)
EF0	This tornado, which occurred simultaneously with the tornado listed above, likely originated as a tornadic waterspout over Back Sound before moving inland. One house sustained considerable roof damage, while multiple other houses and a few storage sheds had shingles blown off. Skirting was torn from a mobile home, and many trees were damaged or toppled over.						

==== Graceville, Florida/Cottonwood–Gordon, Alabama ====
Graceville, Florida/Cottonwood–Gordon, Alabama
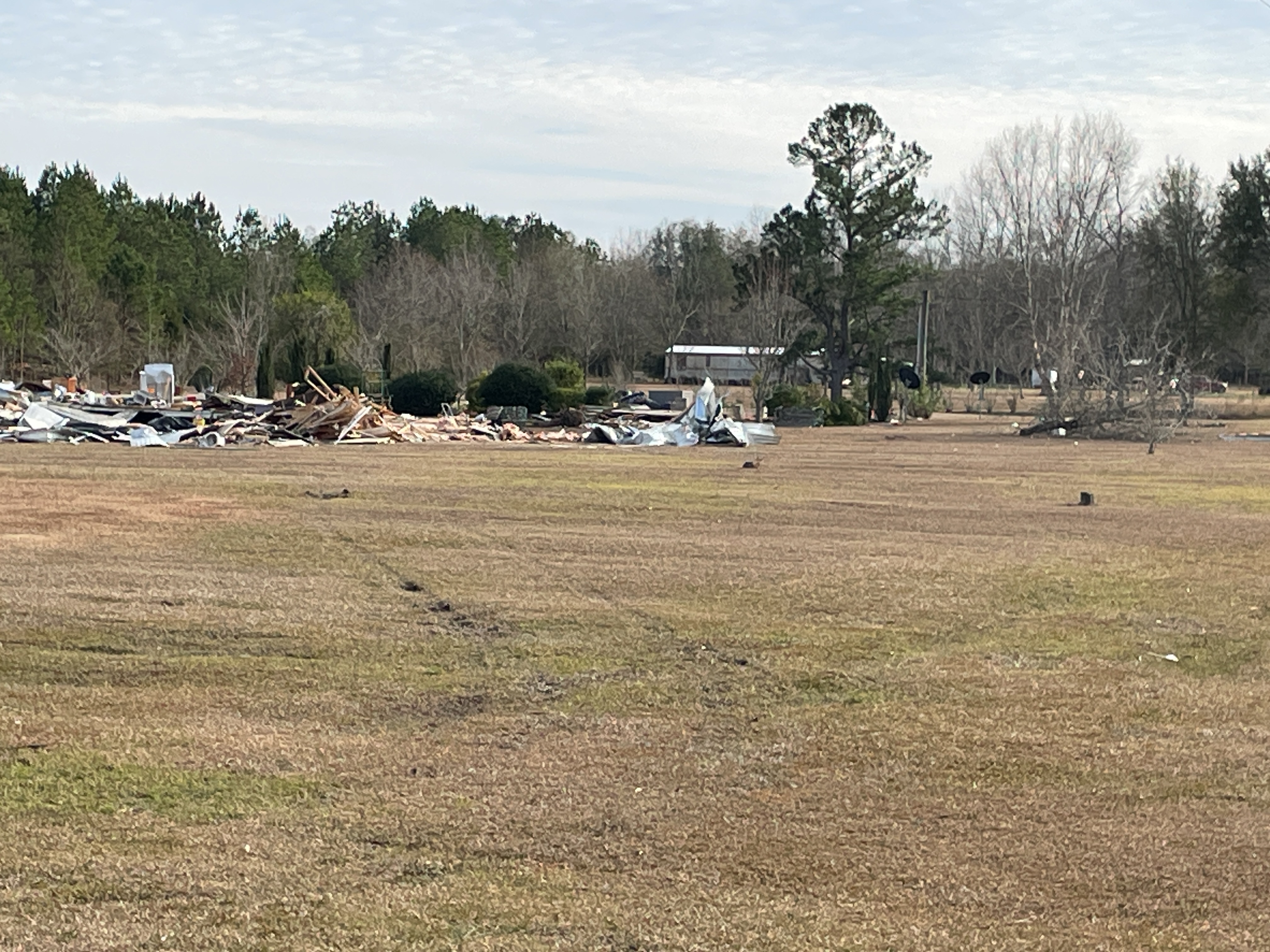
- Remnants of a mobile home that was destroyed at high-end EF2 intensity northeast of Cottonwood, Alabama. One person was killed at this location.

Meteorological history
- Formed: January 9, 2024, 7:50 a.m. CST (UTC−06:00)
- Dissipated: January 9, 2024, 8:22 a.m. CST (UTC−06:00)
- Duration: 32 minutes

EF2 tornado
- on the Enhanced Fujita scale
- Highest winds: 130 mph (210 km/h)

Overall effects
- Fatalities: 1
- Injuries: 10 (+6 indirect)
- Damage: $6.25 million (2024 USD)

This large, long-tracked tornado developed over remote swampland north of Chipley, Florida in Jackson County and moved north-northeastward along Hickshill Road at EF1 intensity, snapping or uprooting trees and damaging an outbuilding. The tornado then turned northeastward, continuing to damage trees along with the roof of a double-wide mobile home along Piano Road. Continuing northeastward, the tornado continued to snap and uprooted trees and damaged another outbuilding. South of Graceville along SR 77, the tornado damaged homes, blew out the windows of a mobile home, heavily damaged or destroyed outbuildings, and snapped or uprooted countless trees. It also destroyed a pair of 90-foot-tall (27 m) concrete silos along Cliff Road. Southeast of town, more trees were snapped or uprooted and a home along CR 169 suffered considerable roof damage in this area. Another home along Shiloh Church Loop also suffered significant roof damage to the east of Graceville. The tornado then crossed SR 2, snapping or uprooting more trees and causing minor roof damage to another home before moving over open terrain, where little if any damage occurred. Right before crossing the Florida–Alabama state line, the tornado inflicted minor roof damage to a small business along with minor damage to an outbuilding as it crossed US 231.

Continuing northeastward, the tornado then crossed the state line into Houston County, Alabama while still at EF1 intensity. South of Madrid, the tornado struck a large McLane Company warehouse, which had multiple exterior walls blown out. Many trees were snapped or uprooted, and a power pole was damaged. Beyond this point, several houses, mobile homes, and outbuildings had roofing material torn off, a few power poles were snapped, and countless trees were snapped or uprooted along this segment of the path as well. The tornado briefly reached EF2 intensity as it approached Cottonwood, completely destroying a well-anchored mobile home. The tornado then moved directly through Cottonwood, where several homes and businesses had major roof damage, and one business in the downtown area sustained a total collapse of its front masonry wall. A couple of churches also had roof and window damage and a metal building was left with a large dent in it and had wall panels removed. Much of the peak damage in Cottonwood was rated EF1, but a small area of EF2 damage occurred along SR 53, where a two-story house had its roof torn off. Another area of EF2 damage occurred as the tornado left the town when it leveled a cinderblock Moose Lodge building and a third area of EF2 damage occurred from large trees being snapped. The tornado continued northeastward, continuing to snap trees with a mobile home suffering minor damage. The tornado then briefly reached its peak intensity of high-end EF2 along September Road where a double-wide mobile home was leveled, resulting in a fatality. After moving over another area of open terrain, the tornado caused EF1 tree damage along Creek Church Road. A small outbuilding was also knocked over and at least one power pole was snapped. After crossing US 84 at EF0 strength, the tornado caused some additional tree damage. One final area of EF1 damage occurred along Ed Tolar Road, where a home suffered minor roof damage before the tornado dissipated as it reached CR 95 northwest of Gordon.

The tornado traveled 34.76 miles (55.94 km) and reached a width of 1,000 yards (910 m). One person was killed, and ten others were injured, with six others being injured indirectly.

== See also ==
- List of North American tornadoes and tornado outbreaks
- Weather of 2024
- List of United States tornadoes from January to March 2024
