= Lower Grand Lagoon, Florida =

- Census-designated place
- Interactive map of Lower Grand Lagoon, Florida
- Coordinates: 30°08′15″N 85°44′41″W
- Country: United States
- State: Florida
- County: Bay

Area
  - Total: 2.68 sq mi (6.95 km^{2})
  - Land: 2.10 sq mi (5.44 km^{2})
  - Water: 0.58 sq mi (1.51 km^{2})
- Elevation: 10 ft (3.0 m)

Population (2020)
  - Total: 4,398
  - Density: 2,094.2/sq mi (808.59/km^{2})
- Time zone: UTC-6 (Central (CST))
  - Summer (DST): UTC-5 (CDT)
- ZIP code: 32408
- Area code: 850
- FIPS code: 12-41562
- GNIS feature ID: 2403243

Lower Grand Lagoon is a census-designated place (CDP) in Bay County, Florida, United States. The population was 4,398 at the 2020 census, up from 3,881 at the 2010 census. It is part of the Panama City–Panama City Beach, Florida Metropolitan Statistical Area. The area was heavily damaged by an EF3 tornado on January 9, 2024.

== Geography ==
Lower Grand Lagoon is located at 30°9′3″N 85°45′41″W (30.150784, -85.761490).

According to the United States Census Bureau, the CDP has a total area of 2.7 square miles (7.0 km^{2}), of which 2.1 square miles (5.5 km^{2}) is land and 0.58 square miles (1.5 km^{2}), or 21.68%, is water.

== Demographics ==
Historical population
Census	Pop.	Note	%±
1980	1,619		—
1990	3,329		105.6%
2000	4,082		22.6%
2010	3,881		−4.9%
2020	4,398		13.3%

=== 2020 census ===
As of the 2020 census, Lower Grand Lagoon had a population of 4,398. The median age was 52.3 years. 12.1% of residents were under the age of 18 and 24.8% of residents were 65 years of age or older. For every 100 females there were 102.2 males, and for every 100 females age 18 and over there were 102.2 males age 18 and over.

100.0% of residents lived in urban areas, while 0.0% lived in rural areas.

There were 2,277 households in Lower Grand Lagoon, of which 14.7% had children under the age of 18 living in them. Of all households, 39.7% were married-couple households, 24.5% were households with a male householder and no spouse or partner present, and 26.3% were households with a female householder and no spouse or partner present. About 36.5% of all households were made up of individuals and 13.5% had someone living alone who was 65 years of age or older.

There were 6,854 housing units, of which 66.8% were vacant. The homeowner vacancy rate was 0.9% and the rental vacancy rate was 24.8%.

Racial composition as of the 2020 census
Race	Number	Percent
White	3,822	86.9%
Black or African American	104	2.4%
American Indian and Alaska Native	27	0.6%
Asian	26	0.6%
Native Hawaiian and Other Pacific Islander	5	0.1%
Some other race	67	1.5%
Two or more races	347	7.9%
Hispanic or Latino (of any race)	245	5.6%

=== 2000 census ===
As of the 2000 census, there were 4,082 people, 2,097 households, and 1,052 families residing in the CDP. The population density was 1,877.7 inhabitants per square mile (725.0/km^{2}). There were 5,697 housing units at an average density of 2,620.6 per square mile (1,011.8/km^{2}). The racial makeup of the CDP was 95.88% White, 1.18% African American, 0.59% Native American, 0.73% Asian, 0.07% Pacific Islander, 0.32% from other races, and 1.22% from two or more races. Hispanic or Latino of any race were 3.06% of the population.

Of the 2,097 households, 16.1% had children under the age of 18 living with them, 39.5% were married couples living together, 7.2% had a female householder with no husband present, and 49.8% were non-families. 37.3% of all households were made up of individuals, and 9.4% had someone living alone who was 65 years of age or older. The average household size was 1.95 and the average family size was 2.50.

In the CDP, the population was spread out, with 13.4% under the age of 18, 9.4% from 18 to 24, 33.6% from 25 to 44, 25.7% from 45 to 64, and 18.0% who were 65 years of age or older. The median age was 42 years. For every 100 females, there were 104.7 males. For every 100 females age 18 and over, there were 107.1 males.

The median income for a household in the CDP was $31,599, and the median income for a family was $38,650. Males had a median income of $27,648 versus $21,905 for females. The per capita income for the CDP was $20,433. About 13.3% of families and 16.3% of the population were below the poverty line, including 29.6% of those under age 18 and 6.8% of those age 65 or over.
