= Cottonwood, Alabama =

- Town
- Location of Cottonwood in Houston County, Alabama.
- Coordinates: 31°03′19″N 85°18′03″W
- Country: United States
- State: Alabama
- County: Houston

Area
  - Total: 5.80 sq mi (15.03 km^{2})
  - Land: 5.78 sq mi (14.97 km^{2})
  - Water: 0.023 sq mi (0.06 km^{2})
- Elevation: 161 ft (49 m)

Population (2020)
  - Total: 1,048
  - Density: 181.3/sq mi (69.99/km^{2})
- Time zone: UTC-6 (Central (CST))
  - Summer (DST): UTC-5 (CDT)
- ZIP code: 36320
- Area code: 334
- FIPS code: 01-17824
- GNIS feature ID: 2406321
- Website: www.cottonwoodalabama.com

Cottonwood is a town in Houston County, Alabama, United States. One source said the town incorporated in 1901, although the 1910 U.S. census stated 1903. It is part of the Dothan, Alabama Metropolitan Statistical Area. As of the 2020 census, Cottonwood had a population of 1,048.

The area was heavily damaged by an EF2 tornado on January 9, 2024. One person was killed and five others were injured.

== Geography ==
Cottonwood is located in southern Houston County. Alabama State Route 53 passes through the center of town, leading north 14 miles (23 km) to Dothan and southeast 7 miles (11 km) to the Florida state line. Malone, Florida, is 11 miles (18 km) southeast of Cottonwood.

According to the U.S. Census Bureau, the town has a total area of 5.8 square miles (15.0 km^{2}), of which 0.03 square miles (0.07 km^{2}), or 0.45%, are water.

== Demographics ==
Historical population
Census	Pop.	Note	%±
1910	352		—
1920	293		−16.8%
1930	410		39.9%
1940	600		46.3%
1950	864		44.0%
1960	953		10.3%
1970	1,149		20.6%
1980	1,352		17.7%
1990	1,385		2.4%
2000	1,170		−15.5%
2010	1,289		10.2%
2020	1,048		−18.7%
U.S. Decennial Census; 2013 Estimate

=== Racial and ethnic composition ===
Cottonwood town, Alabama – Racial and ethnic composition Note: the US Census treats Hispanic/Latino as an ethnic category. This table excludes Latinos from the racial categories and assigns them to a separate category. Hispanics/Latinos may be of any race. Race and ethnicity was not surveyed for populations under 2,500 in the 1980 census and under 1,000 in 1990 census.
Race / Ethnicity (NH = Non-Hispanic)	Pop 1990	Pop 2000	Pop 2010	Pop 2020	% 1990	% 2000	% 2010	% 2020
White alone (NH)	976	786	917	692	70.47%	67.18%	71.14%	66.03%
Black or African American alone (NH)	404	339	327	278	29.17%	28.97%	25.37%	26.53%
Native American or Alaska Native alone (NH)	1	8	8	3	0.07%	0.68%	0.62%	0.29%
Asian alone (NH)	3	0	0	6	0.22%	0.00%	0.00%	0.57%
Native Hawaiian or Pacific Islander alone (NH)	x	0	0	0	x	0.00%	0.00%	0.00%
Other race alone (NH)	0	0	0	1	0.00%	0.00%	0.00%	0.10%
Mixed race or Multiracial (NH)	x	14	23	44	x	1.20%	1.78%	4.20%
Hispanic or Latino (any race)	1	23	14	24	0.07%	1.97%	1.09%	2.29%
Total	1,385	1,170	1,289	1,048	100.00%	100.00%	100.00%	100.00%

=== 2020 census ===
As of the 2020 census, Cottonwood had a population of 1,048. The median age was 45.2 years. 20.9% of residents were under the age of 18 and 22.4% of residents were 65 years of age or older. For every 100 females there were 94.8 males, and for every 100 females age 18 and over there were 90.1 males age 18 and over.

0.0% of residents lived in urban areas, while 100.0% lived in rural areas.

There were 468 households in Cottonwood, of which 28.6% had children under the age of 18 living in them. Of all households, 36.8% were married-couple households, 20.5% were households with a male householder and no spouse or partner present, and 35.7% were households with a female householder and no spouse or partner present. About 30.9% of all households were made up of individuals and 15.8% had someone living alone who was 65 years of age or older.

There were 557 housing units, of which 16.0% were vacant. The homeowner vacancy rate was 0.3% and the rental vacancy rate was 4.2%.

=== 2010 census ===
At the 2010 census there were 1,289 people, 553 households, and 350 families in the town. The population density was 234.4 inhabitants per square mile (90.5/km^{2}). There were 638 housing units at an average density of 116 per square mile (45/km^{2}). The racial makeup of the town was 71.8% White, 25.4% Black or African American, 0.6% Native American, and 1.9% from two or more races. 1.1% of the population were Hispanic or Latino of any race. Of the 553 households 24.4% had children under the age of 18 living with them, 42.0% were married couples living together, 16.1% had a female householder with no husband present, and 36.7% were non-families. 33.5% of households were one person and 13.9% were one person aged 65 or older. The average household size was 2.33 and the average family size was 2.99.

The age distribution was 22.5% under the age of 18, 9.2% from 18 to 24, 22.2% from 25 to 44, 29.2% from 45 to 64, and 16.9% 65 or older. The median age was 42.4 years. For every 100 females, there were 87.9 males. For every 100 females age 18 and over, there were 86.4 males.

The median household income was $26,570 and the median family income was $27,465. Males had a median income of $28,942 versus $27,857 for females. The per capita income for the town was $15,090. About 26.1% of families and 28.0% of the population were below the poverty line, including 38.5% of those under age 18 and 13.5% of those age 65 or over.

=== 2000 census ===
At the 2000 census there were 1,170 people, 485 households, and 323 families in the town. The population density was 212.9 inhabitants per square mile (82.2/km^{2}). There were 548 housing units at an average density of 99.7 per square mile (38.5/km^{2}). The racial makeup of the town was 69.06% White, 29.06% Black or African American, 0.68% Native American, and 1.20% from two or more races. 1.97% of the population were Hispanic or Latino of any race. Of the 485 households 29.3% had children under the age of 18 living with them, 48.2% were married couples living together, 14.2% had a female householder with no husband present, and 33.2% were non-families. 30.5% of households were one person and 15.5% were one person aged 65 or older. The average household size was 2.41 and the average family size was 3.01.

The age distribution was 26.5% under the age of 18, 7.1% from 18 to 24, 25.0% from 25 to 44, 24.5% from 45 to 64, and 16.9% 65 or older. The median age was 38 years. For every 100 females, there were 90.6 males. For every 100 females age 18 and over, there were 86.1 males.

The median household income was $21,452 and the median family income was $32,065. Males had a median income of $25,833 versus $15,515 for females. The per capita income for the town was $13,111. About 18.1% of families and 27.2% of the population were below the poverty line, including 28.8% of those under age 18 and 42.1% of those age 65 or over.

== Notable people ==
- Pete Coachman, former Major League Baseball player (California Angels)
- Emmett Ripley Cox, Senior Judge of the United States Court of Appeals for the Eleventh Circuit
- Curtis McGriff, former defensive lineman for the New York Giants of the National Football League
