= DeFuniak Springs Airport =

Coordinates: 30°43′52.0″N 086°09′13.6″W

- IATA: none; ICAO: none; FAA LID: 54J

Summary
- Airport type: Public use
- Owner: City of DeFuniak Springs
- Operator: Kim Kirby
- Serves: DeFuniak Springs, Florida
- Location: Walton County, Florida
- Elevation AMSL: 289 ft (88 m)
- Interactive map of DeFuniak Springs Airport

Runways
Direction	Length		Surface
Direction	ft	m	Surface
09/27	4,146	1,264	Asphalt
18/36	2,700	823	Dirt

Statistics (2016)
- Aircraft operations: 16,200
- Based aircraft: 32
- Source: Federal Aviation Administration

DeFuniak Springs Airport (FAA LID: 54J) is a public-use airport located two nautical miles (3.7 km) west of the central business district of the city of DeFuniak Springs in Walton County, Florida, United States. The airport is publicly owned and operated by the City of DeFuniak Springs and serves the general aviation transportation needs of the City and Walton County. In addition to private and recreational flying, the airport also supports business and corporate aviation. The airport is situated on 343 acres of land located approximately 2.5 miles west of the City's Central Business District.

== See also ==
- List of airports in Florida
