= Tanner Williams, Alabama =

Unincorporated community in Alabama, United States

- Unincorporated community
- Location within Alabama Location within the United States
- Coordinates: 30°43′27″N 88°22′12″W
- Country: United States
- State: Alabama
- County: Mobile
- Elevation: 180 ft (55 m)
- Time zone: UTC-6 (Central (CST))
  - Summer (DST): UTC-5 (CDT)
- Area code: 251
- GNIS feature ID: 127668

Tanner Williams is an unincorporated community in Mobile County, Alabama, United States.

== History ==
Tanner Williams is named after two local landowners. The Tanner Williams School, which is no longer in use, was first opened in 1914.
