= Shipman, Mississippi =

- Unincorporated community
- Location within Mississippi Location within the United States
- Coordinates: 30°52′39″N 88°28′30″W
- Country: United States
- State: Mississippi
- County: George
- Elevation: 128 ft (39 m)
- Time zone: UTC-6 (Central (CST))
  - Summer (DST): UTC-5 (CDT)
- GNIS feature ID: 692228

Shipman (also known as Brushy) is an unincorporated community in George County, Mississippi. Prior to the creation of George County, Shipman was located in Jackson County. The community was originally called Brushy, but the name was changed to Shipman in 1907. Shipman is likely named for William A. Shipman, who moved to the community from Georgia and operated a sawmill in the area.

Shipman was once a depot on the Gulf, Mobile and Ohio Railroad. The community was once home to three general stores, four turpentine distilleries, and two sawmills.

A post office operated under the name Brushy from 1896 to 1906 and under the name Shipman from 1906 to 1941.
