= Back Sound =

Lagoon in North Carolina

Coordinates: 34°41′05″N 76°34′14″W

- Interactive map of Back Sound

The Back Sound is a lagoon in eastern North Carolina. Running on an east–west axis, the sound separates Shackleford Banks to the south from the mainland and Harkers Island to the north. At the sound's eastern end lies Cape Lookout and Core Sound, while on the west end lies the Crystal Coast community of Beaufort and Bogue Sound. Barden Inlet at the eastern end, and Beaufort Inlet on the western end connect the sound to Onslow Bay. Much of the islands in the sound are protected as part of the Rachel Carson Estuarine Reserve, set aside for the protection of Banker horses.
