= Bayard (Jacksonville) =

Neighborhood of Jacksonville, Florida

Coordinates: 30°08′35″N 81°30′47″W

Bayard is a historical community of Duval County, Jacksonville, Florida, US. Originally platted in 1884, the community was a busy stopping point for tourists and industry through the early part of the 20th century. In the early 2000s, the City of Jacksonville began developing The Bayard Community Plan in an effort to preserve the character of Bayard as Jacksonville expands towards the community.

== History ==
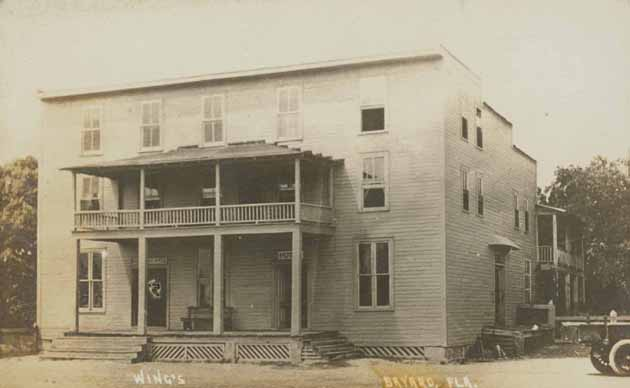
Bayard Wing Hotel 1901

During the Third Seminole War, a company of infantry of the Special Battalion of Florida Volunteers was mustered in at Bayard in September 1856.

The area was further developed in 1884 when it was platted as a midpoint between Jacksonville and St. Augustine. The area soon became very busy. With easy access to transportation provided by railroad and waterways and with close proximity to sawmills and turpentine distilleries, it was a convenient depot town. Tourists also used it as a rest stop, both before and after the 1934 completion of U.S. Route 1.

The origin of Bayard's name is disputed. According to the City of Jacksonville, the community was named for Thomas F. Bayard; the Federal Writers' Project, publishing in 1939, indicates the same, stating that Florida East Coast Railway builder Henry M. Flagler bestowed the name. Locals indicate instead that the community is named for Bayard Clinch, who was the son of Duncan Lamont Clinch, an assertion that dates back at least to 1939.

Beautyrest Cabins

Bayard's commercial development through its early years reflects its use as a stopping point, with gift shops, restaurants and places for travelers to stay. Among its early historical buildings was The Bayard Inn. Opened in 1899 by Juliet Wing, a Union soldier's widow, as a combined general store and hotel, called The Wing Hotel, the Inn flourished until its closure in 1947, when it became a mix of residence and business with a post office and brothel on the ground floor. A proposal to designate the building, then known as the Bayard Country Store, as an historical landmark failed in December, 2001, when the owner wished to sell the building and protested its designation. In order to pass the building under owner protest, Jacksonville's Historic Preservation Commission would have had to find that the building sufficiently met the city's criterion, but it did not, although it did find that the building was a "significant reminder" of the city's heritage and was worthy of preservation. The Bayard Inn was demolished in 2005, but other historically significant buildings—including the public school reserved for use by black children—still remain.

== Bayard Community Plan ==
As commercial use in Bayard has waned and Jacksonville is expanding towards Bayard, the City of Jacksonville, with input from the Bayard community, has developed The Bayard Community Plan to maintain the character of the original community, while still allowing growth. As of January 2009, the plan, proposed in April 2007 with accompanying "Smartcode Development Regulations" in September 2007, was before the Land Use & Zoning Committee.
