= Gordon, Alabama =

- Town
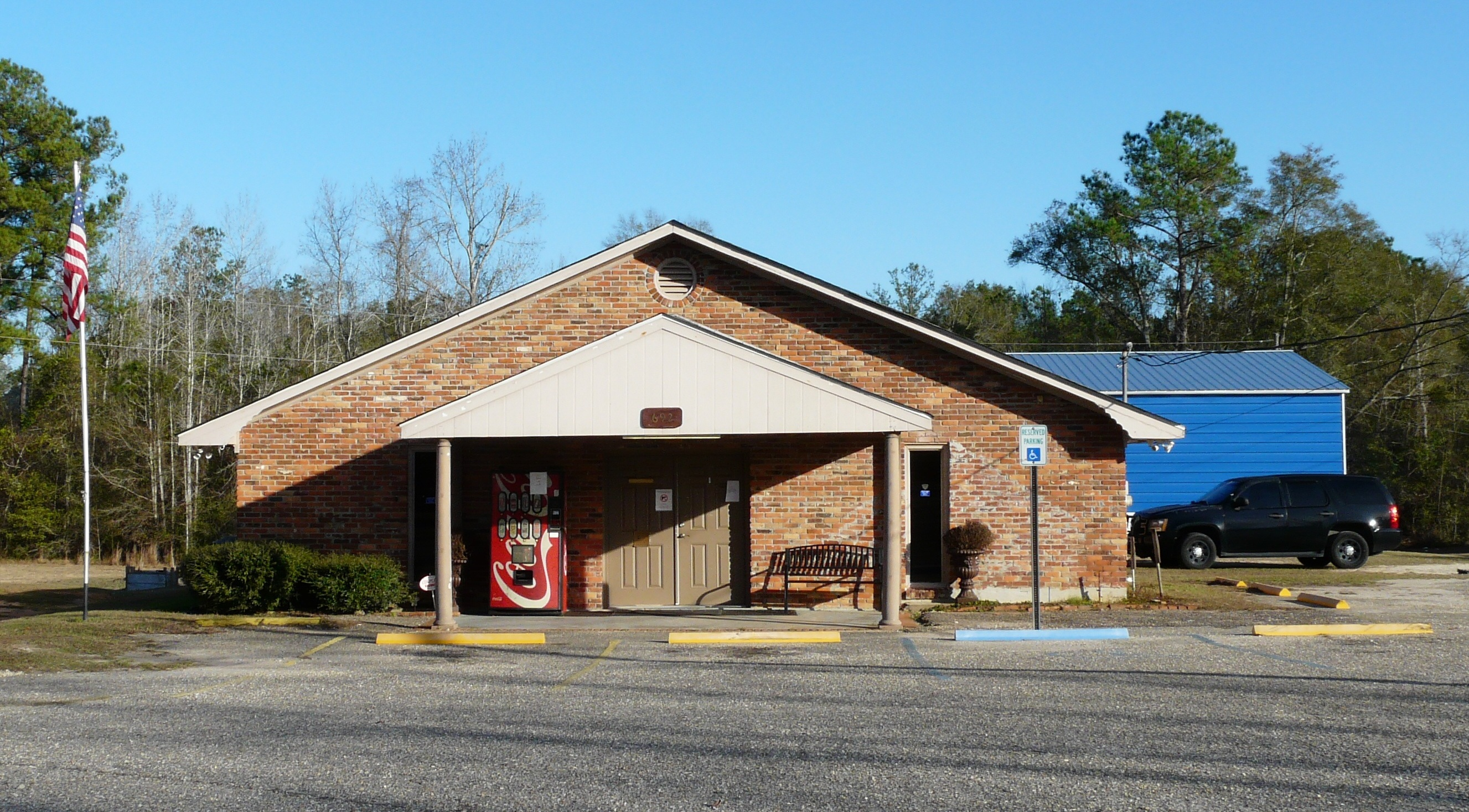
- Town Hall

- Flag

- Location of Gordon in Houston County, Alabama.
- Coordinates: 31°08′37″N 85°05′33″W
- Country: United States
- State: Alabama
- County: Houston

Area
  - Total: 2.92 sq mi (7.56 km^{2})
  - Land: 2.92 sq mi (7.56 km^{2})
  - Water: 0 sq mi (0.00 km^{2})
- Elevation: 161 ft (49 m)

Population (2020)
  - Total: 294
  - Density: 100.7/sq mi (38.87/km^{2})
- Time zone: UTC-6 (Central (CST))
  - Summer (DST): UTC-5 (CDT)
- ZIP code: 36343
- Area code: 334
- FIPS code: 01-30760
- GNIS feature ID: 2406591
- Website: townofgordon.org

Gordon is a town in Houston County, Alabama, United States. It was incorporated in February 1872. It is part of the Dothan, Alabama Metropolitan Statistical Area. As of the 2020 census, Gordon had a population of 294.

== Geography ==
Gordon is located in eastern Houston County and is bordered to the northeast by the Chattahoochee River, which forms the Alabama–Georgia border, and to the south by U.S. Route 84. US 84 leads west 19 miles (31 km) to Dothan and southeast 36 miles (58 km) to Bainbridge, Georgia. Alabama State Route 95 passes through the north and east sides of Gordon, leading north 12 miles (19 km) to Columbia and south 11 miles (18 km) to the Florida state line.

According to the U.S. Census Bureau, Gordon has a total area of 3.2 square miles (8.3 km^{2}), all land.

== Demographics ==
Historical population
Census	Pop.	Note	%±
1880	150		—
1900	356		—
1910	293		−17.7%
1920	319		8.9%
1930	299		−6.3%
1940	327		9.4%
1950	275		−15.9%
1960	222		−19.3%
1970	312		40.5%
1980	362		16.0%
1990	493		36.2%
2000	408		−17.2%
2010	332		−18.6%
2020	294		−11.4%
U.S. Decennial Census; 2013 Estimate

=== 2020 census ===
Gordon racial composition
Race	Num.	Perc.
White (non-Hispanic)	88	29.93%
Black or African American (non-Hispanic)	190	64.63%
Native American	1	0.34%
Asian	1	0.34%
Other/Mixed	12	4.08%
Hispanic or Latino	2	0.68%

As of the 2020 United States census, there were 294 people, 113 households, and 68 families residing in the town.

=== 2000 census ===
As of the census of 2000, there were 408 people, 144 households, and 108 families residing in the town. The population density was 125.8 inhabitants per square mile (48.6/km^{2}). There were 165 housing units at an average density of 50.9 per square mile (19.7/km^{2}). The racial makeup of the town was 74.02% Black or African American, 23.04% White, 0.74% Native American, 0.25% Asian, 0.25% from other races, and 1.72% from two or more races. 1.47% of the population were Hispanic or Latino of any race.

There were 144 households, out of which 41.0% had children under the age of 18 living with them, 47.2% were married couples living together, 22.2% had a female householder with no husband present, and 25.0% were non-families. 25.0% of all households were made up of individuals, and 11.1% had someone living alone who was 65 years of age or older. The average household size was 2.83 and the average family size was 3.33.

In the town, the population was spread out, with 33.8% under the age of 18, 7.4% from 18 to 24, 22.5% from 25 to 44, 24.0% from 45 to 64, and 12.3% who were 65 years of age or older. The median age was 35 years. For every 100 females, there were 84.6 males. For every 100 females age 18 and over, there were 78.8 males.

The median income for a household in the town was $16,917, and the median income for a family was $17,708. Males had a median income of $25,625 versus $15,536 for females. The per capita income for the town was $6,795. About 30.3% of families and 39.9% of the population were below the poverty line, including 48.9% of those under age 18 and 19.4% of those age 65 or over.

== Gallery ==
Below are photographs taken in Gordon as part of the Historic American Buildings Survey:

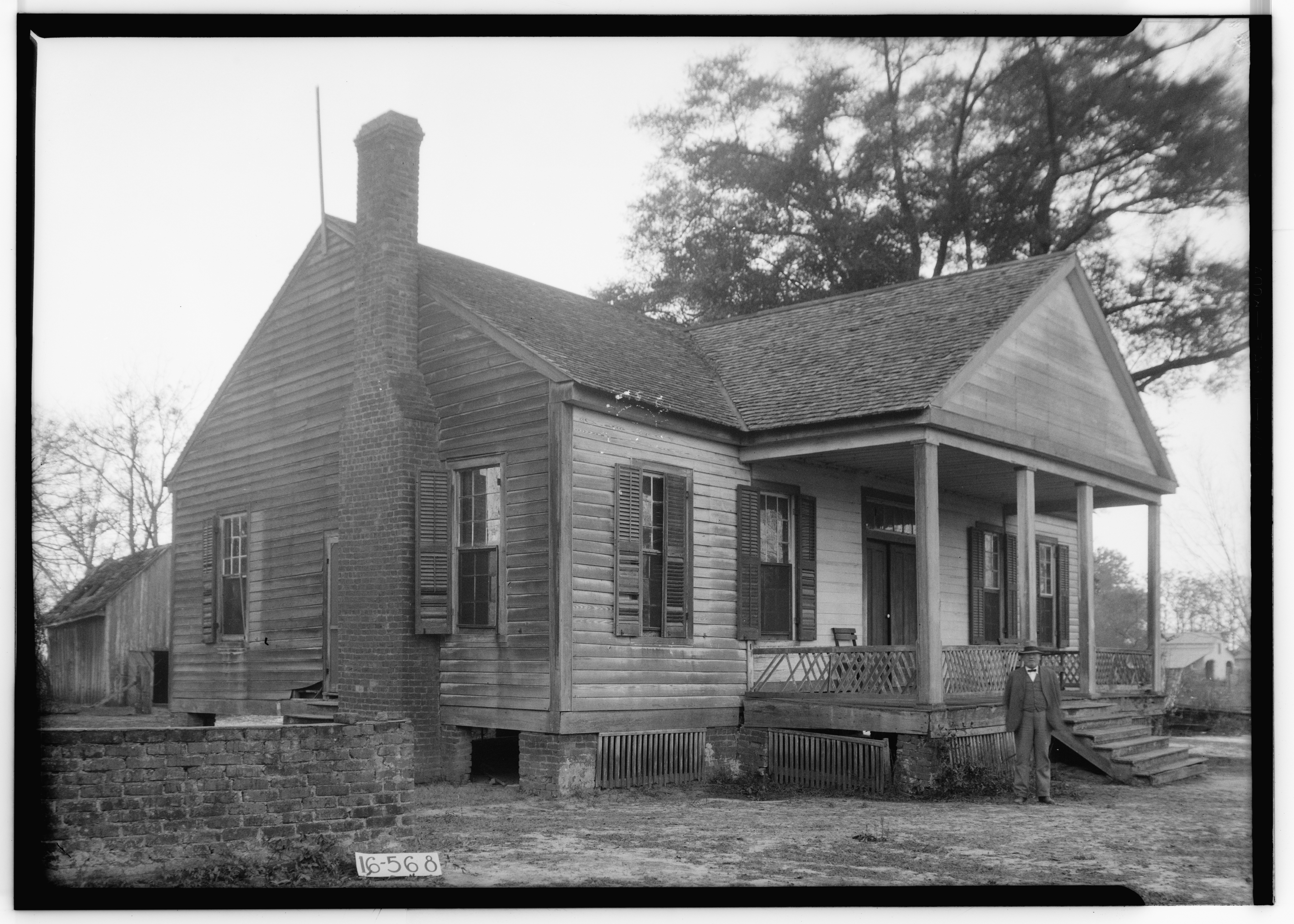
Britt-Williams-Borders House

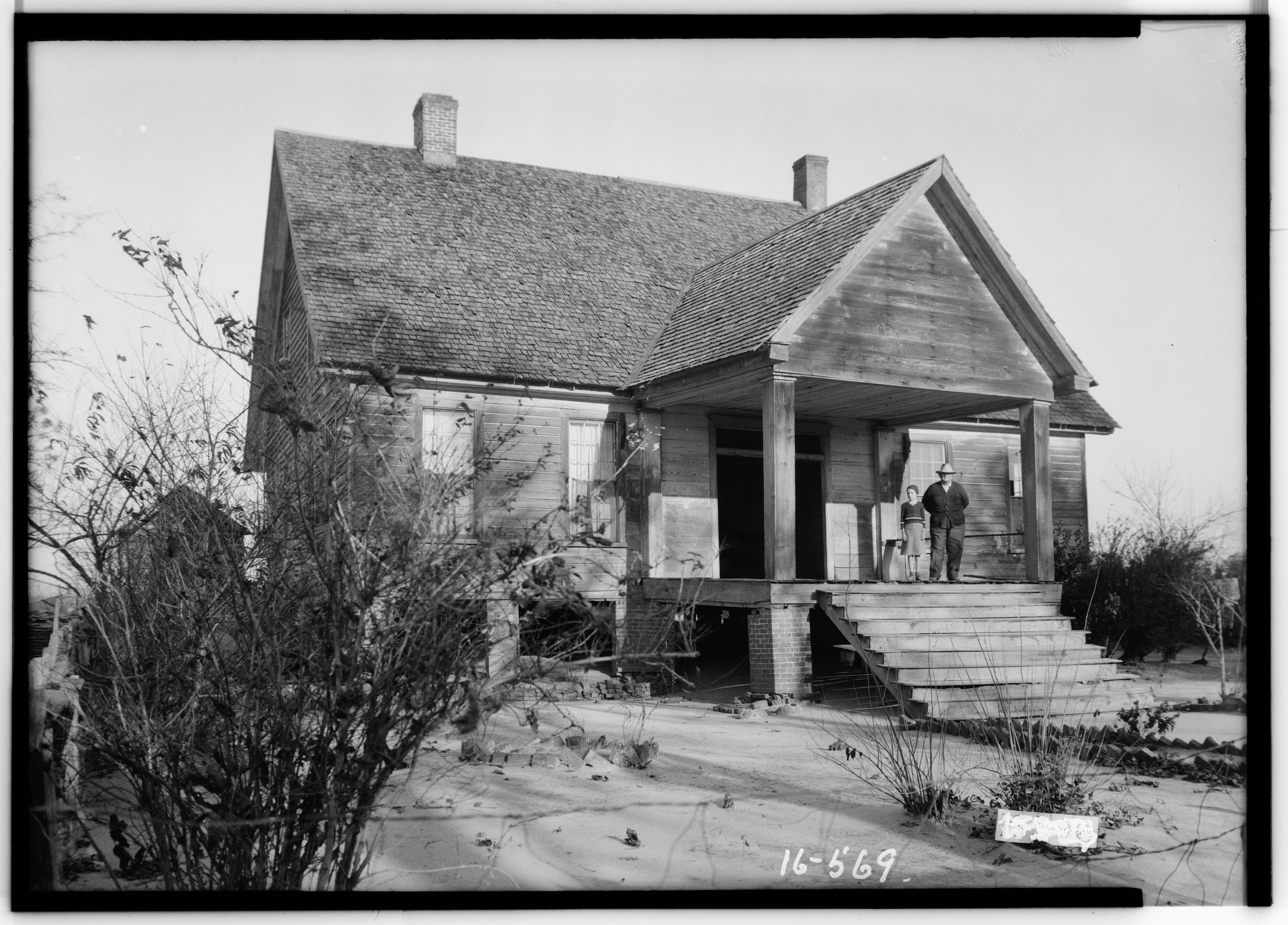
Nunnley-Bowden House
