= Brushy Creek =

Brushy Creek may refer to:

== Streams ==
=== Australia ===
- Brushy Creek (Melbourne), a creek in the eastern suburbs of Melbourne

=== United States ===
- Brushy Creek (Platte River tributary), a stream in Iowa and Missouri
- Brushy Creek (Beaver Creek), a stream in Taney County, Missouri
- Brushy Creek (Big Creek), a stream in Henry County, Missouri
- Brushy Creek (Black River), a stream in Carter and Wayne counties in Missouri
- Brushy Creek (Deepwater Creek), a stream in Bates and Henry counties in Missouri
- Brushy Creek (Fishing River tributary), a stream in Clay County, Missouri
- Brushy Creek (Gravois Creek), a stream in Morgan County, Missouri
- Brushy Creek (Saint Johns Creek), a stream in Franklin County, Missouri
- Brushy Creek (Saline Creek), a stream in Ste. Genevieve County, Missouri
- Brushy Creek (Meade County, South Dakota)
- Brushy Creek (Perkins County, South Dakota)
- Brushy Creek (San Gabriel River tributary), a creek in Williamson County, Texas

== Communities ==
- Brushy Creek, Anderson County, Texas
- Brushy Creek, Williamson County, Texas, a census-designated place

== Other ==
- Brushy Creek (Greenville, South Carolina), a historic home
- Brushy Creek Ruin, a National Register of Historic Places listing in Hidalgo County, New Mexico
- Brushy Creek State Recreation Area, Iowa

== See also ==
- Brushy Branch, a stream in Missouri
- Brushy Fork (Tavern Creek tributary), Missouri
- Brushy Fork (Pauls Creek tributary), North Carolina
