= Brushy =

Brushy may refer to:

- Brushy, Oklahoma, United States, a census-designated place
- Brushy Mountains (disambiguation) or Mountain, various mountains in the United States
- Brushy Peak, California, United States
- Brushy Butte, California
- Brushy Lake (Sallisaw, Oklahoma), United States, a reservoir
- Brushy Creek (disambiguation), various creeks in the United States and one in Australia
- Brushy Branch, a stream in Missouri, United States
- Brushy Fork (Tavern Creek tributary), Missouri, United States
- Brushy Fork (Pauls Creek tributary), North Carolina, United States
- Brushy Fork, West Virginia, United States - see Brushy Fork Coal Impoundment

== See also ==
- Brushy Bill Roberts (1879–1950), a man who claimed to be the outlaw Billy the Kid
