= Salt River Township, Audrain County, Missouri =

Township in Missouri, United States

Salt River Township
- Township
- Coordinates: 39°10′34″N 091°53′45″W
- Country: United States
- State: Missouri
- County: Audrain

Area
  - Total: 111.70 sq mi (289.30 km^{2})
  - Land: 110.79 sq mi (286.94 km^{2})
  - Water: 0.91 sq mi (2.36 km^{2}) 0.82%
- Elevation: 794 ft (242 m)

Population (2010)
  - Total: 9,497
  - Density: 86/sq mi (33.1/km^{2})
- FIPS code: 29-65558
- GNIS feature ID: 0766246

Salt River Township is one of eight townships in Audrain County, Missouri, United States. As of the 2010 census, its population was 9,497.

Salt River Township was established in 1837, and named for a river of the same name within its borders.

== Geography ==
Salt River Township covers an area of 111.7 square miles (289.3 km^{2}). It contains part of one incorporated city, Mexico (the county seat). Unincorporated places include Champ, Francis (railroad station; formerly Felton), Molino (former post office), Ortiz (railroad station; formerly Doan, and also known as Ortiz Station), Salt River (former post office), and Young's Creek (former post office).

The streams of Brushy Branch, Fish Branch, Fivemile Creek, Little Skull Lick Creek, Middle Lick Creek, Scattering Fork and Skull Lick Creek run through this township.

There are four cemeteries in the township: Elmwood, Mount Zion, Saint Brendans and Trinity.
