= List of United States tornadoes from January to March 2022 =

United States tornadoes from January to March 2022
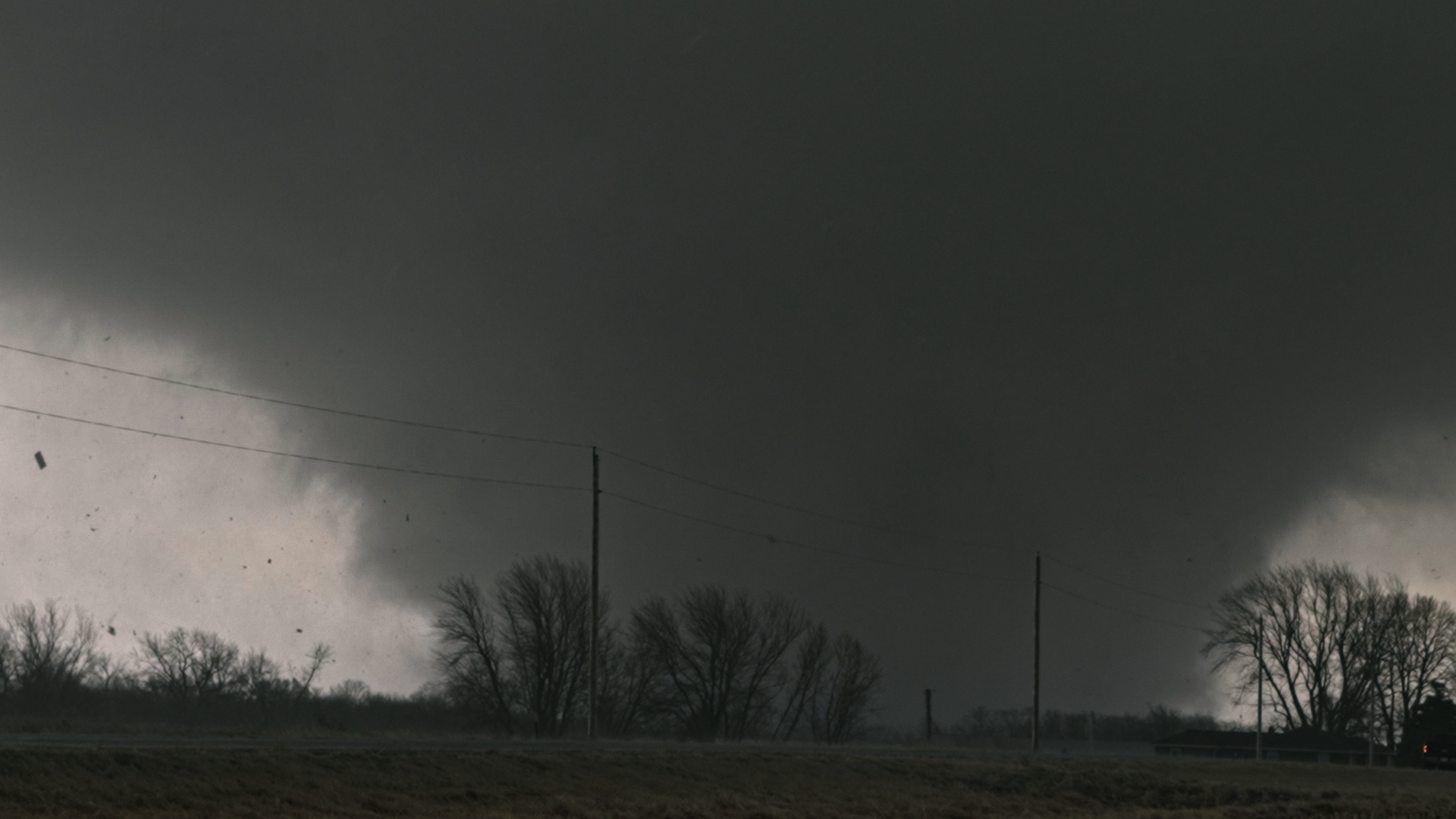
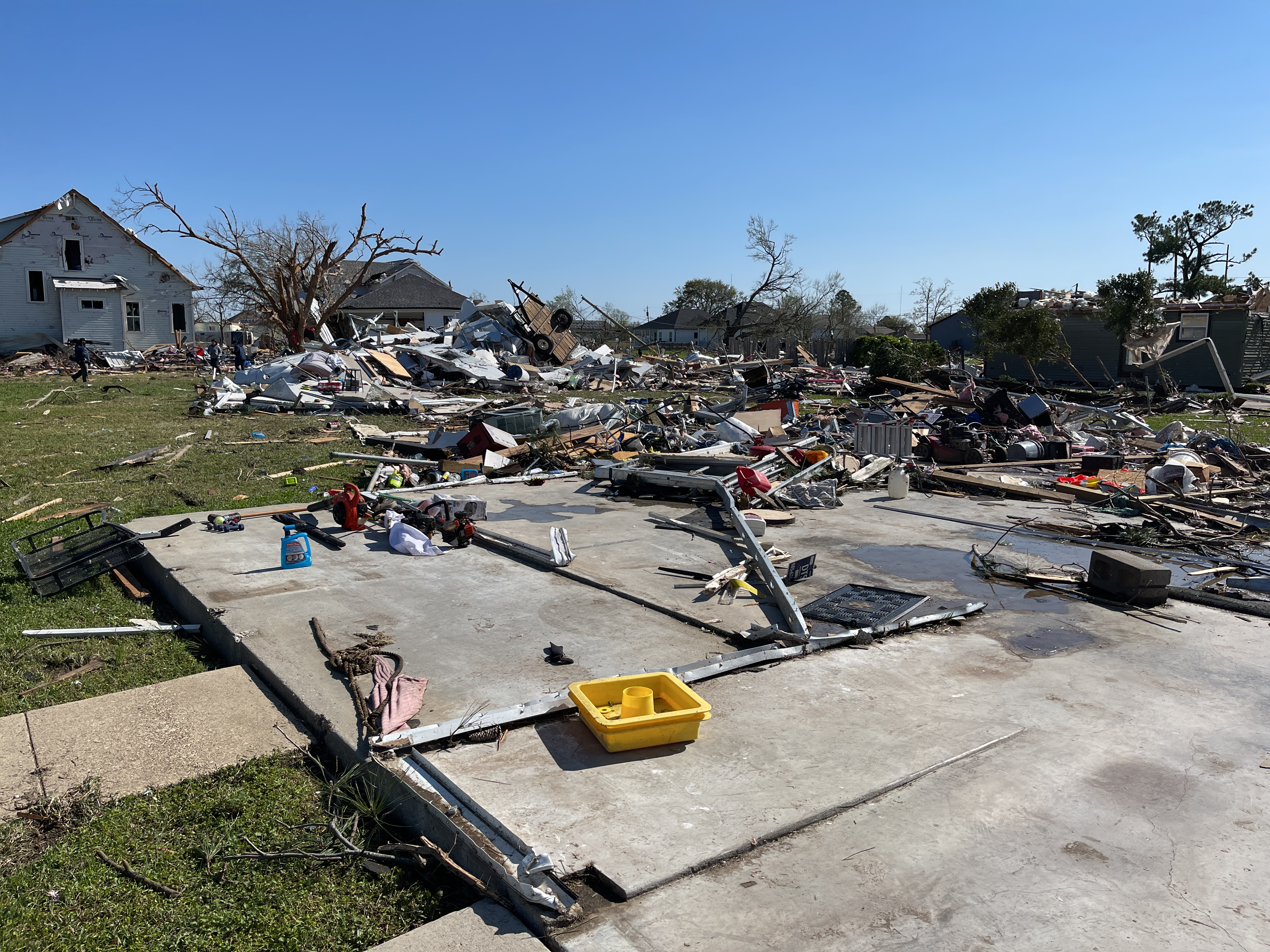
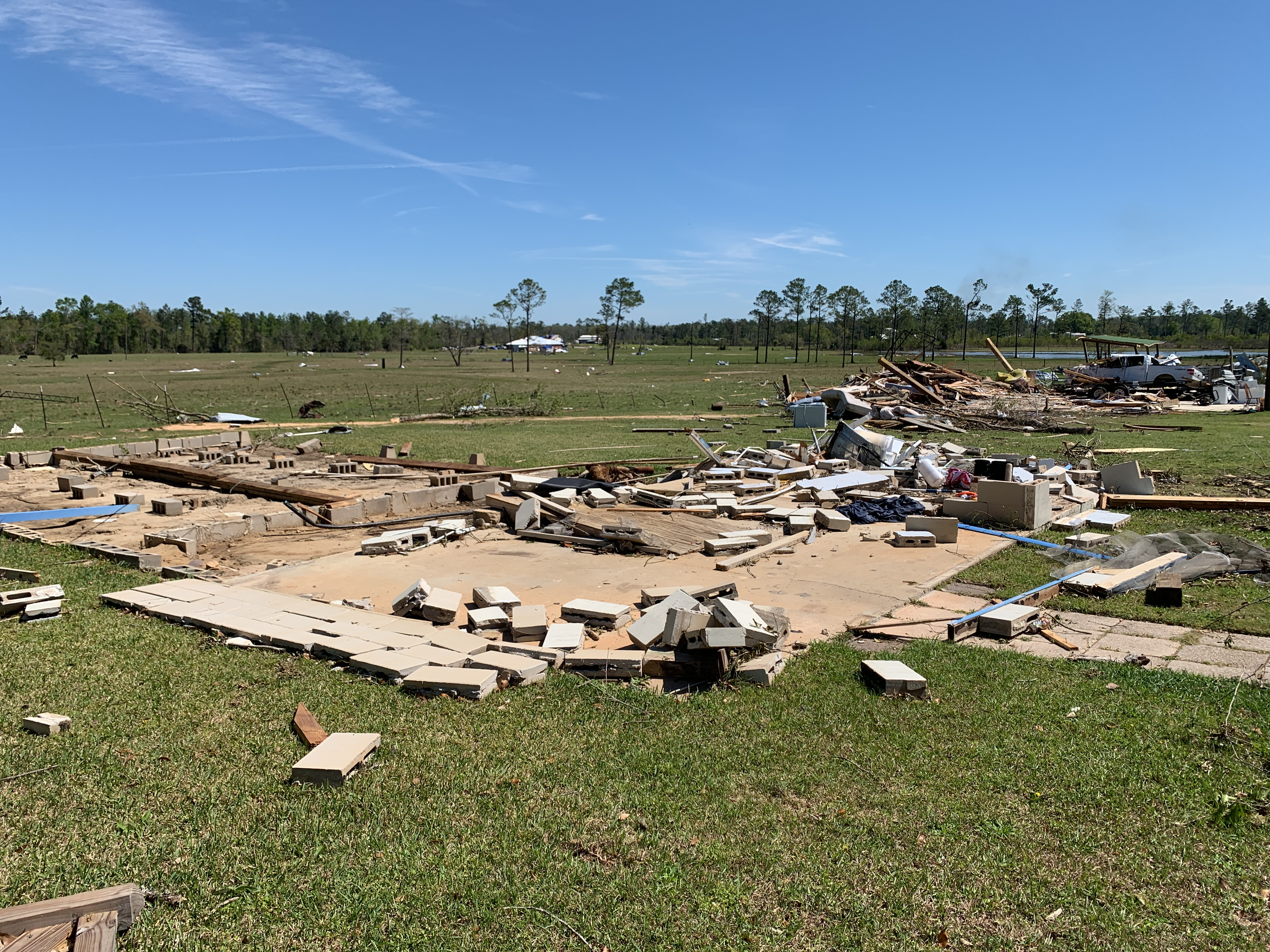
- Clockwise from top: A deadly EF4 tornado near Winterset, Iowa on March 5; A brick home near Alford, Florida following an EF3 tornado on March 31; A home swept away by an EF3 tornado that struck Arabi, Louisiana on March 22.
- Timespan: January 1 – March 31
- Maximum rated tornado: EF4 tornado: Winterset, Iowa on March 5
- Tornadoes: 283
- Fatalities: 13
- Injuries: 95

This page documents all tornadoes confirmed by various weather forecast offices of the National Weather Service in the United States from January to March 2022. In a recent 2000–2020 period, an average January features 32 tornadoes across the United States, the lowest month in a given year; the broader 1991–2010 climatology is slightly higher at 35. An additional 36 tornadoes are recorded in February, and about 80 tornadoes are recorded in March. These tornadoes are commonly focused across the Southern United States due to their proximity to the unstable airmass and warm waters of the Gulf of Mexico, as well as California in association with winter storms. The year's first tornado, part of a broader outbreak on New Year's Day, caused EF2 damage on the Enhanced Fujita scale in Hopkinsville, Kentucky, a region hit particularly hard from one of the deadliest and largest December outbreaks on record.

Overall, January was a relatively average month for tornadoes, with 37 confirmed. February saw only 11 tornadoes with all but two of them touching down in Alabama. As spring approached, a dramatic upswing occurred in March as 235 tornadoes were confirmed in the United States, second only to March 2025. Outbreaks during the month produced 32, 85, and 90 tornadoes, which helped to ramp up tornadic activity.

== United States yearly total ==
Confirmed tornadoes by Enhanced Fujita rating
EFU	EF0	EF1	EF2	EF3	EF4	EF5	Total
157	406	466	123	20	4	0	1,176

== January ==
Confirmed tornadoes by Enhanced Fujita rating
EFU	EF0	EF1	EF2	EF3	EF4	EF5	Total
0	18	16	3	0	0	0	37

=== January 1 event ===
List of confirmed tornadoes – Saturday, January 1, 2022 (Note: All dates are based on the local time zone where the tornado touched down; however, all times are in Coordinated Universal Time for consistency.)
EF#	Location	County / Parish	State	Start Coord.	Time (UTC)	Path length	Max width
EF2	Hopkinsville	Christian	KY	36.86°N 87.49°W	15:21–15:22	1.14 mi (1.83 km)	125 yd (114 m)
EF2	A short-lived but strong low-end EF2 tornado struck Hopkinsville. Several businesses and warehouses in town sustained minor to extensive damage to their roofs, walls, windows, and entryways. A few businesses, homes, and a church also sustained major roof damage, and some buildings sustained collapse of cinder block exterior walls. A gas station canopy and gas pumps were destroyed, and many trees were snapped or uprooted.						
EF0	W of Bonnieville	Hart	KY	37.377°N 85.986°W	16:52–16:53	0.35 mi (0.56 km)	50 yd (46 m)
EF0	In the Priceville area, a large barn was thrown 200–250 yd (180–230 m) to the southwest, and its foundation was moved 18 in (0.46 m) to the east. A smaller barn was thrown 60 yd (55 m) into the second story of a house, and a third barn had some of its roofing tossed up to 400 yd (370 m) away. Several trees were downed as well.						
EF0	SW of Allensville to SSE of Olmstead	Todd, Logan	KY	36.6975°N 87.0981°W	17:16–17:22	5.88 mi (9.46 km)	100 yd (91 m)
EF0	A large pole barn had half of its roof removed and two garage doors blown in. Trees were snapped and uprooted as well. The tornado was originally rated EF1, but was downgraded to EF0 in the final report.						
EF1	E of Olmstead to SE of Russellville	Logan	KY	37.373°N 85.385°W	17:22–17:32	11.03 mi (17.75 km)	100 yd (91 m)
EF1	This tornado came from the same circulation that produced the previous tornado. Two barns and a silo were completely destroyed. Two other silos sustained major damage, and additional barns were damaged as well. A house had minor damage to its porch, and numerous trees were snapped or uprooted.						
EF1	Eastern Lebanon	Marion	KY	37.574°N 85.234°W	17:49–17:50	0.26 mi (0.42 km)	50 yd (46 m)
EF1	A brief multi-vortex tornado overturned an empty trailer, damaged the corner of a metal building, and twisted a flat metal roof. A trailer garage had its roof peeled off and a side wall collapsed. Another trailer was rotated, while a nearby garage door was crumpled inward.						
EF0	Southern Bowling Green	Warren	KY	36.943°N 86.445°W	17:52–17:53	0.39 mi (0.63 km)	75 yd (69 m)
EF0	A brief, weak tornado damaged gutters, shingles, roofs, and soffits, and snapped trees within a larger area of straight-line wind damage.						
EF1	N of Campbellsville	Taylor	KY	37.373°N 85.385°W	18:00–18:06	6.38 mi (10.27 km)	350 yd (320 m)
EF1	Many outbuildings and homes sustained mostly roof damage. An air conditioning unit was pushed partly off its foundation. Two power poles were bent, including one that was cracked at its base. A large garage suffered significant roof damage and had a wall buckled outward. Numerous trees were snapped or uprooted along the path.						
EF1	NW of Glasgow to Hiseville	Barren	KY	37.043°N 85.991°W	18:17–18:29	10.57 mi (17.01 km)	150 yd (140 m)
EF1	Over half a dozen barns were severely damaged or destroyed, including within Hiseville, with debris from these structures thrown as far as 400 yd (370 m) away. A large grain silo sustained damage to its side. Two homes suffered damage to their gutters, siding, and shingles. Trees were snapped, twisted, or uprooted, and gravestones at a cemetery in Hiseville were knocked over.						
EF1	NE of Richmond	Madison	KY	37.797°N 84.207°W	18:49–18:51	1.75 mi (2.82 km)	125 yd (114 m)
EF1	Multiple outbuildings were destroyed, several homes sustained roof and window damage, and hundreds of trees were downed in the Union City community.						
EF1	NNE of Waco	Estill	KY	37.827°N 84.101°W	18:59–19:00	1.1 mi (1.8 km)	140 yd (130 m)
EF1	The roof of an auto repair facility was damaged and a barn was collapsed. Numerous trees were snapped or uprooted as well.						
EF1	SW of Lester, AL to SW of Elkton, TN	Limestone (AL), Giles (TN)	AL, TN	34.9631°N 87.1858°W	22:04–22:25	16.67 mi (26.83 km)	150 yd (140 m)
EF1	Numerous outbuildings and barns sustained damage, and many trees were snapped or uprooted.						
EF0	SE of Muscle Shoals	Colbert	AL	34.7161°N 87.6413°W	00:03–00:06	2.09 mi (3.36 km)	60 yd (55 m)
EF0	Several homes sustained shingle damage, and several trees were uprooted.						
EF0	NW of Hazel Green to NNW of New Market	Madison	AL	34.9468°N 86.5983°W	00:15–00:27	9.55 mi (15.37 km)	30 yd (27 m)
EF0	A mobile home had its roof torn off, several businesses sustained minor damage, and several tree branches were snapped. One person was injured.						
EF0	W of Triana	Limestone, Madison	AL	34.5748°N 86.7943°W	01:24–01:35	3.68 mi (5.92 km)	150 yd (140 m)
EF0	Dozens of homes in Triana sustained minor roof and siding damage, and many trees were downed along the path.						

=== January 2 event ===
List of confirmed tornadoes – Sunday, January 2, 2022
EF#	Location	County / Parish	State	Start Coord.	Time (UTC)	Path length	Max width
EF0	NW of DeFuniak Springs Airport	Walton	FL	30.7388°N 86.1598°W	19:02–19:03	0.13 mi (0.21 km)	85 yd (78 m)
EF0	Two mobile homes and several outbuildings sustained damage, and a few trees were uprooted.						
EF0	S of Abbeville	Wilcox	GA	31.8658°N 83.3347°W	22:27–22:28	0.52 mi (0.84 km)	100 yd (91 m)
EF0	Several trees were snapped or uprooted. A medium-sized shed was destroyed, and some tin was pulled off the roof of a house.						
EF0	SE of Vidalia	Toombs	GA	32.197°N 82.4034°W	00:00–00:01	0.42 mi (0.68 km)	100 yd (91 m)
EF0	A fire station had its garage doors blown out and had a portion of its roof and siding pulled off. Debris was thrown about 200 yd (180 m) downstream. Some other structures suffered minor roof damage. Trees were snapped or uprooted.						

=== January 3 event ===
List of confirmed tornadoes – Monday, January 3, 2022
EF#	Location	County / Parish	State	Start Coord.	Time (UTC)	Path length	Max width
EF0	SW of Coats	Harnett	NC	35.3957°N 78.6977°W	12:21–12:22	0.79 mi (1.27 km)	75 yd (69 m)
EF0	Several homes sustained roof, window, and siding damage. About a dozen trees were snapped or uprooted. At least two fences were blown over, and at least two sheds or outbuildings were rolled over or destroyed.						
EF1	S of Newton Grove	Sampson	NC	35.2145°N 78.3624°W	12:36–12:37	0.12 mi (0.19 km)	75 yd (69 m)
EF1	Two hog barns sustained considerable roof and structural damage, with damage totalling $1.5 million.						

=== January 8 event ===
List of confirmed tornadoes – Saturday, January 8, 2022
EF#	Location	County / Parish	State	Start Coord.	Time (UTC)	Path length	Max width
EF0	SW of Humble	Harris	TX	29.9387°N 95.339°W	21:55–21:57	0.79 mi (1.27 km)	30 yd (27 m)
EF0	A few structures had minor damage, including a hotel, and several trees were downed just south of George Bush Intercontinental Airport.						
EF0	Western Dayton	Liberty	TX	30.0425°N 94.9065°W	22:22	0.14 mi (0.23 km)	20 yd (18 m)
EF0	A tornado briefly touched down on the west side of Dayton, causing no damage.						
EF0	Montgomery	Montgomery	TX	30.3912°N 95.6873°W	03:40–03:44	0.47 mi (0.76 km)	200 yd (180 m)
EF0	A restaurant and several buildings under construction were damaged.						
EF1	NNW of Hedwig Village	Harris	TX	29.7911°N 95.5288°W	05:55–05:58	1.1 mi (1.8 km)	40 yd (37 m)
EF1	Damage was intermittent, with the failure of a brick façade on an office building constituting the most severe damage. A few homes sustained roof damage, and several trees were downed.						

=== January 9 event ===
List of confirmed tornadoes – Sunday, January 9, 2022
EF#	Location	County / Parish	State	Start Coord.	Time (UTC)	Path length	Max width
EF1	Humble	Harris	TX	29.97°N 95.27°W	07:17–07:22	2.18 mi (3.51 km)	40 yd (37 m)
EF1	A retail building lost its roof and three walls, a post office suffered minor damage, and several trees were downed. Multiple homes were damaged, and a few vans were flipped in a church parking lot.						
EF1	NE of Humble	Harris	TX	30.0249°N 95.2359°W	07:25–07:29	2.24 mi (3.60 km)	75 yd (69 m)
EF1	Large trees were downed, some of which fell on structures.						
EF1	W of Hornbeck	Sabine	LA	31.3286°N 93.4226°W	10:42–10:43	0.24 mi (0.39 km)	100 yd (91 m)
EF1	A home suffered shingle damage and roughly 50 hardwood and softwood trees were either snapped or uprooted.						
EF2	E of Florien	Sabine	LA	31.4132°N 93.3238°W	10:53–11:01	3.56 mi (5.73 km)	900 yd (820 m)
EF2	About 30 homes were impacted in the Peason community, with 10 to 15 of those being heavily damaged or destroyed. The tornado peaked in intensity as it completely destroyed a mobile home, blowing its remnants up to 60 feet (18 m) away into a tree line. Five people were in the mobile home at the time, all of whom were injured, some critically. Another injury occurred elsewhere, and outbuildings were destroyed at several farms along the path. At least one thousand trees were either snapped or uprooted along the path. This tornado caused $1.5 million in damage.						
EF0	E of Ansley	Pike	AL	31.894°N 86.085°W	22:37–22:39	0.36 mi (0.58 km)	100 yd (91 m)
EF0	A brief tornado caused considerable roof damage to a metal farm building and tossed a feed bin 150 feet (46 m) away into a field. Another barn sustained minor damage.						
EF0	NNE of Owassa	Conecuh	AL	31.5063°N 86.9244°W	22:47–22:53	2.3 mi (3.7 km)	25 yd (23 m)
EF0	A few trees were downed.						
EF1	SE of McKenzie	Butler	AL	31.5312°N 86.7063°W	23:20–23:23	0.68 mi (1.09 km)	25 yd (23 m)
EF1	A mobile home sustained minor damage, and a few trees were downed. In November 2023, this tornado was reanalyzed and upgraded to an EF1 based on multiple uprooted trees via Worldview satellite imagery.						

=== January 16 event ===
List of confirmed tornadoes – Sunday, January 16, 2022
EF#	Location	County / Parish	State	Start Coord.	Time (UTC)	Path length	Max width
EF1	SE of Carrabelle	Franklin	FL	29.7986°N 84.6027°W	05:22–05:26	2.65 mi (4.26 km)	50 yd (46 m)
EF1	One home on Dog Island sustained significant damage to its porch and had its roof partially removed. Trees and power lines were damaged along the path.						
EF1	Placida	Charlotte	FL	26.8299°N 82.2635°W	11:37–11:42	0.97 mi (1.56 km)	50 yd (46 m)
EF1	A waterspout came onshore near a marina where several boats were damaged, including one that was flipped. At least 35 homes were damaged as it struck a manufactured home community before dissipating.						
EF1	SW of Port Charlotte	Charlotte	FL	26.9185°N 82.2206°W	12:15–12:16	0.54 mi (0.87 km)	50 yd (46 m)
EF1	This tornado came from the same storm that produced the previous tornado. Four homes were damaged, two of which sustained major damage, with the other two sustaining minor damage. Several roofs and carports were either heavily damaged or destroyed.						
EF2	SE of Punta Rassa to McGregor	Lee	FL	26.4817°N 81.986°W	12:32–12:48	7.01 mi (11.28 km)	125 yd (114 m)
EF2	This strong tornado began as a waterspout over the Gulf of Mexico before moving inland. The tornado moved through three different mobile home communities in Iona, just southwest of Fort Myers, impacting at least 108 mobile homes. Of those, 30 were completely demolished, including some that were swept from their foundations, and 51 suffered major damage. Three people were injured. Mainly horticulture damage occurred in McGregor before the tornado dissipated near the Cape Coral Bridge. This tornado caused $10 million in damage.						
EF0	NNW of Cape Coral	Lee	FL	26.62°N 82.00°W	14:04–14:05	0.46 mi (0.74 km)	50 yd (46 m)
EF0	A brief tornado captured by doorbell security video caused sporadic minor damage.						
EF0	SW of Lely to E of Naples	Collier	FL	26.02°N 81.767°W	14:07–14:34	15 mi (24 km)	75 yd (69 m)
EF0	Two homes sustained roof damage and a few small trees were uprooted. Large branches were sheared off of several trees. A semi-truck was flipped on Interstate 75, injuring the driver.						
EF0	W of Everglades City to W of Ochopee	Collier	FL	25.86°N 81.41°W	14:53–15:01	5.5 mi (8.9 km)	75 yd (69 m)
EF0	A tornado was caught on video. An NWS damage survey found a leaning power pole.						

== February ==
Confirmed tornadoes by Enhanced Fujita rating
EFU	EF0	EF1	EF2	EF3	EF4	EF5	Total
0	5	3	3	0	0	0	11

=== February 3 event ===
List of confirmed tornadoes – Thursday, February 3, 2022
EF#	Location	County / Parish	State	Start Coord.	Time (UTC)	Path length	Max width
EF2	S of Cuba to S of Livingston	Sumter	AL	32.3565°N 88.3857°W	18:52–19:15	15.47 mi (24.90 km)	900 yd (820 m)
EF2	One home was shifted off its foundation with some of its walls collapsed, and numerous trees were downed. This was the first EF2 tornado produced by the western Alabama supercell.						
EF2	E of Tishabee to ESE of Akron	Greene, Hale	AL	32.6331°N 87.9639°W	19:38–20:16	25.87 mi (41.63 km)	1,700 yd (1,600 m)
EF2	1 death – Trees were downed at EF0 intensity along the beginning of the tornado's path in Greene County near the town of Forkland, some of which fell onto homes. The tornado then crossed into Hale County and intensified as it downed hundreds of trees and damaged or destroyed several manufactured homes, including an unoccupied dwelling that rolled over and landed upside-down on top of a car. After the weakening slightly, the tornado reintensified as it approached and crossed SR 14 north of Sawyerville. Several homes were damaged and a double-wide manufactured home was destroyed, causing several injuries. A fish truck was overturned with its load of fish scattered across the road and two pick-up trucks were thrown into a nearby pond. The tornado reached its peak intensity of high-end EF2 to the northeast as it tore a double-wide manufactured home from its anchors and tossed it approximately 50 yards (46 m) across a road, obliterating it. The one fatality from this tornado occurred here, along with two serious injuries. A home across the street sustained significant roof damage and had many windows blown out, and a manufactured home just to the south was split in half with one of the halves rolling away. Mainly tree damage occurred beyond this point before the tornado dissipated shortly after crossing SR 69. Eight people were injured in total. This was the second EF2 tornado produced by the western Alabama supercell.						
EF2	SSE of Duncanville	Hale, Bibb, Tuscaloosa	AL	32.9401°N 87.4512°W	20:31–20:42	7.6 mi (12.2 km)	725 yd (663 m)
EF2	The third EF2 tornado produced by the western Alabama supercell moved through the Talladega National Forest, snapping or uprooting countless large trees. A home also sustained shingle damage and sheet metal was removed from the roof of a barn.						
EF0	W of Holtville to Jordan Lake	Elmore	AL	32.6449°N 86.3553°W	23:02–23:03	2.13 mi (3.43 km)	100 yd (91 m)
EF0	A few metal carports were thrown, and numerous trees were downed.						
EF0	SW of Martin Dam	Elmore	AL	32.6722°N 85.9251°W	23:33–23:34	0.2 mi (0.32 km)	100 yd (91 m)
EF0	This brief tornado lofted the roof of one outbuilding and blew metal paneling off of another. One house lost shingles and another was damaged by a fallen tree. Several other trees were uprooted as well.						

=== February 17 event ===
List of confirmed tornadoes – Thursday, February 17, 2022
EF#	Location	County / Parish	State	Start Coord.	Time (UTC)	Path length	Max width
EF1	ESE of Berry	Tuscaloosa, Fayette	AL	33.595°N 87.541°W	22:14–22:19	3.37 mi (5.42 km)	475 yd (434 m)
EF1	A mobile home sustained minor damage, an outdoor shed was overturned, and several trees were downed by this high-end EF1 tornado. A PDS tornado warning was issued for this storm.						
EF1	N of Graysville	Jefferson	AL	33.645°N 87°W	22:53–22:58	4.65 mi (7.48 km)	1,100 yd (1,000 m)
EF1	Several trees were snapped or uprooted, and several tractor-trailers were overturned on I-22.						
EF1	NNE of Meadowbrook to ENE of Leeds	Shelby, Jefferson, St. Clair	AL	33.4284°N 86.6744°W	00:08–00:21	12.64 mi (20.34 km)	400 yd (370 m)
EF1	This tornado began in Lake Purdy, downing numerous trees as it moved northeast, including one tree that fell on a home. An apartment complex also sustained minor roof damage. It moved along the west side of Double Oak Mountain and towards Leeds, where many more trees and several power lines were downed. Several homes sustained minor roof and structural damage. A site-built home was damaged by a falling tree, and another falling tree completely destroyed a mobile home. The tornado weakened rapidly as it passed just east of Leeds and crossed into St. Clair County. A warehouse has some limited loss to roofing material before the tornado dissipated.						

=== February 22 event ===
List of confirmed tornadoes – Tuesday, February 22, 2022
EF#	Location	County / Parish	State	Start Coord.	Time (UTC)	Path length	Max width
EF0	WSW of Bay	Craighead	AR	35.7138°N 90.7422°W	11:24–11:28	2.81 mi (4.52 km)	50 yd (46 m)
EF0	This weak tornado tracked across open fields causing little to no damage.						
EF0	SW of Cayce	Fulton	KY	36.53°N 89.07°W	12:28–12:30	0.69 mi (1.11 km)	100 yd (91 m)
EF0	Sections of roofing were removed from hog barns, and several trees and tree limbs were downed. This tornado intersected the path of the 2021 Western Kentucky tornado from two months prior.						
EF0	Southern Hazel Green	Madison	AL	34.90°N 86.60°W	02:22–02:25	3.14 mi (5.05 km)	110 yd (100 m)
EF0	This weak tornado downed two trees and several large tree branches in neighborhoods in the southern part of Hazel Green.						

== March ==
Confirmed tornadoes by Enhanced Fujita rating
EFU	EF0	EF1	EF2	EF3	EF4	EF5	Total
6	72	121	28	7	1	0	235

=== March 5 event ===
List of confirmed tornadoes – Saturday, March 5, 2022
EF#	Location	County / Parish	State	Start Coord.	Time (UTC)	Path length	Max width
EF0	NE of Emerson	Montgomery	IA	41.03°N 95.38°W	21:02	0.01 mi (0.016 km)	17 yd (16 m)
EF0	Multiple storm chasers reported a tornado. Minor damage occurred.						
EFU	SSW of Corning	Adams	IA	40.9344°N 94.7859°W	21:38–21:40	1.48 mi (2.38 km)	40 yd (37 m)
EFU	This was the first tornado from the Winterset supercell. No damage was reported.						
EF0	N of Cromwell	Adams, Union	IA	41.0862°N 94.5078°W	22:01–22:05	2.84 mi (4.57 km)	100 yd (91 m)
EF0	This was the second tornado from the Winterset supercell. The tornado was confirmed from video evidence and caused no known damage.						
EF4	N of Macksburg to Southern Norwalk to NE of Newton	Madison, Warren, Polk, Jasper	IA	41.2334°N 94.2013°W	22:26–00:00	70.57 mi (113.57 km)	900 yd (820 m)
EF4	6 deaths – See article on this tornado – Five people were injured.						
EF2	NE of Leon to E of Derby	Decatur, Wayne, Lucas	IA	40.7595°N 93.708°W	23:07–23:33	19.42 mi (31.25 km)	300 yd (270 m)
EF2	This tornado passed just south of Garden Grove, ripping the roof off of a house and damaging or destroying several outbuildings. The tornado also passed near Humeston, producing additional damage to outbuildings, snapping power poles, and downing numerous trees.						
EFU	NE of Garden Grove	Decatur, Wayne	IA	40.8423°N 93.5849°W	23:20–23:24	2.07 mi (3.33 km)	60 yd (55 m)
EFU	A tornado touched down north of the previous tornado, causing no known damage.						
EFU	SE of Derby	Lucas	IA	40.9031°N 93.4387°W	23:28–23:33	2.07 mi (3.33 km)	60 yd (55 m)
EFU	This tornado touched down just north of and was on the ground at the same time as the previous EF2 tornado near Derby. No notable damage occurred.						
EF3	E of Derby to E of Chariton	Lucas	IA	40.9405°N 93.3854°W	23:33–23:53	11.28 mi (18.15 km)	350 yd (320 m)
EF3	1 death – This low-end EF3 tornado touched down after the EF2 tornado near Derby dissipated. Multiple homes were severely damaged or destroyed, a small music venue had its roof torn off, and gas leaks were reported. Barns and outbuildings were also completely destroyed, along with the Pin Oak Marsh Lodge Educational Center near Chariton. The tornado moved directly through Red Haw State Park, where small structures were destroyed at a campground, boat docks were destroyed, and one person was killed when an RV camper was thrown. Many large trees and power poles were snapped along the path, and one person was injured.						
EF2	SW of Allerton to E of Corydon	Wayne	IA	40.6834°N 93.3892°W	23:38–23:51	9.87 mi (15.88 km)	300 yd (270 m)
EF2	A strong tornado touched down near Allerton and clipped the southeastern edge of town, where a manufactured home had its roof torn off, power poles were snapped, and trees were downed. A concession stand was completely destroyed at the local baseball field, and two frozen turkeys that originated at a residence nearly a half-mile away were found at that location. A machine shed was destroyed near Corydon before the tornado dissipated.						
EF0	S of Chariton	Lucas	IA	40.9807°N 93.3198°W	23:40–23:42	0.25 mi (0.40 km)	60 yd (55 m)
EF0	This was a satellite tornado of the EF3 Chariton tornado. It looped around that tornado before being absorbed by the larger circulation, causing little to no damage.						
EF2	NW of Kellogg to NE of Newburg	Jasper, Poweshiek, Tama	IA	41.7455°N 92.9727°W	00:04–00:28	17.31 mi (27.86 km)	500 yd (460 m)
EF2	This large multiple-vortex tornado touched down three minutes after the EF4 tornado dissipated. Trees and power poles were snapped, and outbuildings were destroyed along the path.						
EF2	S of Tama	Tama	IA		00:33–00:42	8.54 mi (13.74 km)	200 yd (180 m)
EF2	This was the fifth tornado from the Winterset supercell. A house had its roof torn off, trees were downed, outbuildings were damaged, and vehicles were flipped.						
EF1	SW of Garrison to W of Urbana	Benton	IA	42.1106°N 92.1864°W	01:10–01:26	13.98 mi (22.50 km)	400 yd (370 m)
EF1	This was the final tornado from the Winterset supercell. Several power poles were snapped, and trees and outbuildings were damaged before the tornado moved into the northwest side of Vinton. In town, the tornado damaged many structures including mobile homes, homes, and buildings at an industrial park. The tornado continued to the northeast of Vinton where it damaged trees and outbuildings before dissipating.						
EF0	W of Davenport	Scott	IA	41.5374°N 90.7259°W	02:37–02:38	0.11 mi (0.18 km)	25 yd (23 m)
EF0	A brief, weak tornado damaged a shed and downed a few trees.						
EF1	WNW of Davenport	Scott	IA	41.5355°N 90.7032°W	02:37–02:41	4.09 mi (6.58 km)	300 yd (270 m)
EF1	Several barns and outbuildings were either damaged or destroyed, and trees were downed along an intermittent path.						
EF1	NE of Erie to NW of Prophetstown	Whiteside	IL	41.6757°N 90.0558°W	03:13–03:18	3.98 mi (6.41 km)	50 yd (46 m)
EF1	Farm sheds and trees were damaged along the path.						
EF1	SE of Stoughton	Dane	WI	42.871°N 89.1947°W	03:48–03:57	5.98 mi (9.62 km)	50 yd (46 m)
EF1	Several homes and outbuildings were damaged, and trees and tree limbs were downed.						
EF0	NE of Kilbourne to E of Easton	Mason	IL	40.1971°N 89.9508°W	04:11–04:19	6.93 mi (11.15 km)	50 yd (46 m)
EF0	This tornado damaged trees and knocked over six irrigation systems.						
EF1	S of Farmersville	Montgomery	IL	39.403°N 89.664°W	04:57–05:00	3.89 mi (6.26 km)	40 yd (37 m)
EF1	One farm home had its garage roof and porch awning ripped off. Several barns and other farm buildings sustained significant damage, and a semi-truck on I-55 was flipped.						

=== March 6 event ===
List of confirmed tornadoes – Sunday, March 6, 2022
EF#	Location	County / Parish	State	Start Coord.	Time (UTC)	Path length	Max width
EF0	SW of Royal Center	Cass	IN	40.8219°N 86.5484°W	07:05–07:06	0.41 mi (0.66 km)	25 yd (23 m)
EF0	Houses sustained minor damage, an empty silo was destroyed, and trees were downed.						
EF0	N of Versailles	Darke	OH	40.2395°N 84.5174°W	09:21–09:24	2.87 mi (4.62 km)	100 yd (91 m)
EF0	Two large barns were destroyed, several outbuildings and houses were damaged, and several trees were either snapped or uprooted.						
EF0	N of Russia	Darke, Shelby	OH	40.2467°N 84.4431°W	09:23–09:25	2.52 mi (4.06 km)	100 yd (91 m)
EF0	Two barns and a silo were destroyed and several other barns were damaged. Three homes sustained roof damage and trees were downed.						
EF0	SW of Cash	Craighead	AR	35.7242°N 90.9893°W	21:54–21:59	2.46 mi (3.96 km)	50 yd (46 m)
EF0	This weak, intermittent tornado moved through open fields, causing no known damage.						
EF1	WNW of Dover to N of Hector	Pope	AR	35.43°N 93.23°W	23:18–23:39	15.6 mi (25.1 km)	600 yd (550 m)
EF1	A few homes and outbuildings were damaged, and large sliding doors on a volunteer fire department building were blown in. Many trees were downed, one of which landed on a house.						
EF0	S of McDougal to NW of Pollard	Clay	AR	36.407°N 90.394°W	23:28–23:38	6.39 mi (10.28 km)	50 yd (46 m)
EF0	This weak tornado had an intermittent path and caused no known damage.						
EF0	ENE of Neelyville	Butler	MO	36.5866°N 90.4501°W	23:35–23:36	0.1 mi (0.16 km)	50 yd (46 m)
EF0	This brief tornado was caught on video. No damage was found.						
EF1	SW of Flag	Searcy, Stone	AR	35.8011°N 92.4292°W	00:26–00:29	2.40 mi (3.86 km)	200 yd (180 m)
EF1	Several trees were uprooted, roofing was removed from a barn, and a few other barns were damaged.						
EF2	SE of Melbourne to NW of Evening Shade	Izard, Sharp	AR	36.03°N 91.84°W	01:17–01:31	11.34 mi (18.25 km)	800 yd (730 m)
EF2	Several homes, barns, and sheds were damaged or destroyed in Sage as a result of this low-end EF2 tornado. One horse barn was destroyed, a modular home was torn apart, and one person was injured when a mobile home was rolled. A metal storage container where people were taking shelter was rolled as well, injuring all five of them, one seriously. Many large trees were snapped or uprooted along the path, and power lines were downed.						
EF1	SE of Dalton	Randolph	AR	36.371°N 91.1183°W	02:17–02:20	2.37 mi (3.81 km)	150 yd (140 m)
EF1	Several outbuildings were destroyed, trees were uprooted, and chicken coops were partially or completely destroyed.						

=== March 7 event ===
List of confirmed tornadoes – Monday, March 7, 2022
EF#	Location	County / Parish	State	Start Coord.	Time (UTC)	Path length	Max width
EF1	NW of Star City	Lincoln	AR	33.96°N 91.96°W	07:21–07:32	8.64 mi (13.90 km)	250 yd (230 m)
EF1	Poultry houses were damaged and trees were downed.						
EF1	NW of Gillett	Arkansas	AR	34.15°N 91.46°W	08:02–08:12	6.98 mi (11.23 km)	550 yd (500 m)
EF1	Damage was mostly to trees. Parts of the track could not be surveyed due to proximity to Jacobs Lake.						
EF0	N of Osgood	Ripley	IN	39.1406°N 85.2964°W	09:09–09:11	1.28 mi (2.06 km)	100 yd (91 m)
EF0	A barn was destroyed, a school sustained roof damage, and a home sustained roof and chimney damage. Sports equipment in a field was damaged, trees were downed, and tree limbs were broken.						

=== March 9 event ===
List of confirmed tornadoes – Wednesday, March 9, 2022
EF#	Location	County / Parish	State	Start Coord.	Time (UTC)	Path length	Max width
EF1	NNE of Union Church	Mobile	AL	30.6102°N 88.3371°W	06:42–06:45	1.77 mi (2.85 km)	50 yd (46 m)
EF1	Roofs were damaged, and trees were snapped or uprooted. The National Weather Service issued a particularly dangerous situation (PDS) tornado warning for this tornado. During the tornado, the National Weather Service in Mobile temporarily transferred operational control to the National Weather Service in New Orleans.						
EF1	W of Evergreen	Conecuh	AL	31.4245°N 87.0796°W	08:11–08:12	0.19 mi (0.31 km)	150 yd (140 m)
EF1	A brief tornado embedded in a larger area of straight-line wind damage caused minor roof damage to three houses and damaged several sheds and storage buildings. A small flag pole was bent to the ground, a power line was downed, and numerous trees were either snapped or uprooted.						
EF1	SE of Clayton	Barbour	AL	31.8440°N 85.4744°W	10:50–11:07	9.14 mi (14.71 km)	280 yd (260 m)
EF1	A large construction business sustained damage to outdoor buildings and many trees were downed, some of which landed on homes and caused damage.						
EF0	Panama City Beach	Bay	FL	30.1416°N 85.7238°W	11:00–11:01	0.07 mi (0.11 km)	50 yd (46 m)
EF0	A brief tornado touched down in a gravel parking lot, tipping over a boat on a trailer and tossing a tram about 100 yards (91 metres), destroying the back of it. Debris was thrown across a golf course as well.						
EF0	N of Chipley	Washington	FL	30.8145°N 85.5588°W	11:06–11:10	1.4 mi (2.3 km)	200 yd (180 m)
EF0	Mobile homes and outbuildings were damaged, some with significant roof damage. Tree limbs were broken and a few hardwood trees were snapped.						
EF1	Bahoma	Washington	FL	30.817°N 85.5013°W	11:12–11:13	0.19 mi (0.31 km)	100 yd (91 m)
EF1	A short-lived tornado, spawned by the same supercell as the Chipley tornado, caused substantial roof damage to large barns and outbuildings and tossed several smaller outbuildings. A couple of trees were uprooted as well.						
EF0	SE of Omaha	Stewart	GA	32.0618°N 84.9969°W	11:48–11:51	1.14 mi (1.83 km)	75 yd (69 m)
EF0	Metal roofing was peeled off at a hunting camp. Trees were downed and branches and tree tops were broken. A tornado debris signature was observed.						
EFU	NW of Greenwood	Jackson	FL	30.87°N 85.18°W	11:55–11:57	0.15 mi (0.24 km)	25 yd (23 m)
EFU	A brief tornado caused no known damage.						
EF1	Callaway	Bay	FL	30.1514°N 85.5656°W	12:15–12:17	0.41 mi (0.66 km)	25 yd (23 m)
EF1	Several mobiles homes were shifted off their foundations and sustained significant roof damage, a garage was severely damage with debris strewn downwind, and windows were broken at a police station. An apartment complex sustained minor damage, and a shed was slightly shifted. A tree and a utility pole were snapped as well.						

=== March 11 event ===
List of confirmed tornadoes – Friday, March 11, 2022
EF#	Location	County / Parish	State	Start Coord.	Time (UTC)	Path length	Max width
EF0	SSW of Jensen Beach	Martin	FL	27.2221°N 80.2367°W	21:24–21:25	0.12 mi (0.19 km)	40 yd (37 m)
EF0	A brief, nearly stationary tornado downed tree limbs and blew down fences.						

=== March 12 event ===
List of confirmed tornadoes – Saturday, March 12, 2022
EF#	Location	County / Parish	State	Start Coord.	Time (UTC)	Path length	Max width
EF1	Dunnellon to eastern Ocala	Marion	FL	29.0497°N 82.461°W	12:45–13:20	26.65 mi (42.89 km)	65 yd (59 m)
EF1	In Dunnellon, a billboard was knocked down and siding was peeled from a professional building. On the south and east sides of Ocala, numerous homes and an apartment building were damaged, trees were uprooted or snapped, and power lines were downed.						
EF1	Hernando Beach to Weeki Wachee	Hernando	FL	28.4946°N 82.6674°W	13:06–13:12	5.8 mi (9.3 km)	100 yd (91 m)
EF1	A waterspout moved onshore and lifted a boat from a dock, and snapped or uprooted trees, some of which fell on and damaged homes. A car was shifted slightly near the end of the path. The cost of damage was conservatively estimated at $50,000.						
EF1	S of Crescent City	Putnam	FL	29.3624°N 81.5563°W	14:03–14:20	5.29 mi (8.51 km)	70 yd (64 m)
EF1	Trees were downed and snapped in a mostly rural area.						
EF1	N of Lorida	Highlands	FL	27.46°N 81.26°W	16:45–16:47	0.65 mi (1.05 km)	50 yd (46 m)
EF1	Several power poles were snapped.						
EF0	Fort Myers Beach	Lee	FL	26.4508°N 81.952°W	17:09–17:10	0.03 mi (0.048 km)	50 yd (46 m)
EF0	A waterspout moved onshore and caused minor damage at Lani Kai Island Resort.						

=== March 14 event ===
List of confirmed tornadoes – Monday, March 14, 2022
EF#	Location	County / Parish	State	Start Coord.	Time (UTC)	Path length	Max width
EF1	W of Leonard	Fannin	TX	33.3686°N 96.3091°W	23:10–23:17	3.28 mi (5.28 km)	150 yd (140 m)
EF1	Several metal barns were heavily damaged, a triple-wide manufactured building was shifted off its cement block foundation, and one home sustained roof and window damage. Numerous trees were downed along the path.						
EF0	NW of Santa Fe	Galveston	TX	29.4050°N 95.1484°W	04:50–04:51	0.14 mi (0.23 km)	30 yd (27 m)
EF0	A very brief tornado snapped a tree, caused damage to the roof of a home, and destroyed a well pump. The garage door of a second home was blown out, and a utility building lost metal siding. Some pieces of heavy equipment moved as well.						

=== March 16 event ===
List of confirmed tornadoes – Wednesday, March 16, 2022
EF#	Location	County / Parish	State	Start Coord.	Time (UTC)	Path length	Max width
EF1	Sarasota	Sarasota	FL	27.3298°N 82.5419°W	18:22–18:27	1.5 mi (2.4 km)	100 yd (91 m)
EF1	A brief tornado was recorded on police video and damaged the roof of an industrial building.						

=== March 18 event ===
List of confirmed tornadoes – Friday, March 18, 2022
EF#	Location	County / Parish	State	Start Coord.	Time (UTC)	Path length	Max width
EF1	S of Holt	Okaloosa	FL	30.6823°N 86.7515°W	17:28–17:32	1.5 mi (2.4 km)	50 yd (46 m)
EF1	A house lost part of its roof and another house lost shingles. One mobile home was destroyed and another sustained roof damage. Trees were snapped, twisted, and uprooted as well.						
EF1	Northern Eucheeanna	Walton	FL	30.6645°N 86.0182°W	20:38–20:40	0.81 mi (1.30 km)	25 yd (23 m)
EF1	A brief tornado snapped numerous trees in a wooded area in the northern part of Eucheeanna and did not affect any structures. A tornado debris signature was detected on radar.						
EF0	W of Marston	New Madrid	MO	36.5107°N 89.6882°W	20:39–20:41	0.71 mi (1.14 km)	50 yd (46 m)
EF0	Several people caught this tornado on video. A carport and power lines were damaged.						
EF2	Northwestern Panama City	Bay	FL	30.1705°N 85.7128°W	23:16–23:20	1.64 mi (2.64 km)	75 yd (69 m)
EF2	Numerous homes were damaged in Panama City, some of which had large sections of their roofs torn off or were shifted off their foundations. One house was moved 4 feet (1.2 m) off its foundation, a church sustained roof damage, and fencing was blown over. Many trees were downed and power poles were snapped, while sheds and carports were destroyed.						
EF1	Salem	Washington	IN	38.556°N 86.178°W	00:06–00:14	5.5 mi (8.9 km)	200 yd (180 m)
EF1	Southwest of Salem, a house and a barn sustained major roof damage and a carport was thrown several hundred feet. Another house sustained minor damage and several outbuildings were also damaged, while dozens of trees were uprooted or snapped. In Salem, a large tree was uprooted, another was damaged, and two businesses sustained damage to their roofs and exteriors.						
EF0	S of Irvington	Breckinridge	KY	37.807°N 86.273°W	02:20–02:24	2.60 mi (4.18 km)	80 yd (73 m)
EF0	A barn lost its roof and tree limbs were downed.						
EF1	S of Rineyville	Hardin	KY	37.703°N 86.005°W	02:38–02:48	4.09 mi (6.58 km)	100 yd (91 m)
EF1	One house suffered major roof damage and another suffered minor roof damage. A barn lost its roof, with debris impaled into the ground, and other barns were damaged. Construction materials were thrown into a field, and trees were damaged.						
EF0	West Point	Hardin, Jefferson	KY	37.991°N 85.961°W	02:52–02:55	1.76 mi (2.83 km)	80 yd (73 m)
EF0	The tornado, which had a skipping path, was produced by the same supercell as the Breckinridge County tornado. About a dozen homes in West Point had roof and siding damage, and trees were downed. A shed lost its roof, which landed on a nearby truck, and a piece of the roof was impaled on a stop sign. The tornado was captured by a home security camera.						
EF1	NE of Lebanon Junction	Bullitt	KY	37.864°N 85.696°W	03:09–03:10	0.33 mi (0.53 km)	100 yd (91 m)
EF1	The roof of a carport was partially blown away and trees were downed in multiple directions.						

=== March 21 event ===
List of confirmed tornadoes – Monday, March 21, 2022
EF#	Location	County / Parish	State	Start Coord.	Time (UTC)	Path length	Max width
EF1	Possum Kingdom Lake	Palo Pinto	TX	32.8672°N 98.5296°W	20:12–20:26	9.73 mi (15.66 km)	400 yd (370 m)
EF1	Small metal buildings and multiple homes sustained roof damage, and trees were snapped along the path.						
EF3	SE of Bryson to NE of Jacksboro	Jack, Montague	TX	33.0446°N 98.3298°W	20:35–21:20	34.51 mi (55.54 km)	880 yd (800 m)
EF3	This long-lived and intense tornado touched down after the previous tornado dissipated. It impacted Jacksboro, with the most severe damage occurring at and around Jacksboro Elementary School. Many homes in town sustained loss of their roofs and exterior walls, and a few poorly built homes collapsed. The elementary school was heavily damaged and had the roof of its gymnasium ripped off, also sustaining the collapse of an exterior wall, while nearby flag poles were bent and cars were overturned in the parking lot. The tornado also struck Jacksboro High School, ripping part of its roof off, damaging the press box at the stadium, and bending the field goal and a light pole. An animal shelter in Jacksboro was also destroyed. Significant damage also occurred in areas outside of town, as a 400-foot-tall guyed communications tower was toppled, metal high-tension truss towers were collapsed, and four large wind turbines were destroyed. Major tree damage occurred along the path, while sheds and outbuildings were damaged or destroyed. Approximately 90 homes were damaged or destroyed by this tornado, and 9 people were injured.						
EF1	SW of Bowie	Montague	TX	33.5069°N 97.9021°W	21:31–21:36	2.07 mi (3.33 km)	150 yd (140 m)
EF1	This was the third tornado from the Jacksboro supercell. Multiple small barns and outbuildings were damaged, including one outbuilding that had its roof ripped off and multiple walls collapsed. Several houses sustained roof damage, and a partially full water tank was blown a considerable distance from where it originated.						
EF1	E of Bowie	Montague	TX	33.5182°N 97.8369°W	21:34–21:39	5.19 mi (8.35 km)	440 yd (400 m)
EF1	This was the fourth tornado from the Jacksboro supercell. Multiple site-built and manufactured homes were impacted, several of which had their roofs lifted and walls collapsed. One manufactured home was completely destroyed, and three people were injured.						
EF0	SSE of Decatur	Wise	TX	33.1329°N 97.6229°W	21:47–21:53	6.12 mi (9.85 km)	150 yd (140 m)
EF0	Multiple homes, outbuildings, a large advertising sign, and a storage building were damaged.						
EF1	E of Nocona	Montague	TX	33.688°N 97.6874°W	21:54–22:15	18.66 mi (30.03 km)	500 yd (460 m)
EF1	This was the fifth tornado from the Jacksboro supercell. Several sheds and small barns were damaged, and a manufactured home was separated from its undercarriage. A nearby house suffered damage to its roof and several windows, and tree damage occurred as well. One person was injured.						
EF0	Courtney	Love	OK	33.94°N 97.479°W	22:17–22:32	6.8 mi (10.9 km)	50 yd (46 m)
EF0	This was the sixth tornado from the Jacksboro supercell. One home had minor damage, and several power lines were downed.						
EF1	NE of Slidell to Gainesville	Denton, Cooke	TX	33.4°N 97.34°W	22:15–22:43	20.39 mi (32.81 km)	150 yd (140 m)
EF1	This tornado came from the same supercell that produced the Wise County EF0 tornado. In Era, minor damage to trees and the canopy of a gas station occurred. Elsewhere, homes sustained major roof damage and trees were snapped. A horse trailer was also flipped, a metal implement shed, and other outbuildings were destroyed, and a steel water tank was knocked over. The tornado struck Gainesville near the end of its path, where fencing was downed, and some businesses had roofing blown off. A metal commercial building in town had two roll-up doors blown out and its roof uplifted. The tornado caused minor damage at a cattle yard before it dissipated at the north edge of Gainesville. In February 2025, the path of this tornado was adjusted southward into Denton County based on the damage path on high-resolution satellite imagery.						
EF0	SSW of Benbrook	Tarrant	TX	32.6563°N 97.478°W	22:31–22:33	0.46 mi (0.74 km)	50 yd (46 m)
EF0	A floating marina cover was thrown about 50 yards (46 m) and destroyed. Several boats and one tree were also damaged. Unusually, this tornado formed in the outflow of a nearby storm.						
EF1	River Oaks	Tarrant	TX	32.7874°N 97.403°W	22:37–22:41	1.3 mi (2.1 km)	50 yd (46 m)
EF1	A tornado downed and damaged numerous trees in a neighborhood.						
EF2	ESE of Kingsbury to Stairtown	Guadalupe, Caldwell	TX	29.63°N 97.78°W	22:48–23:08	7.93 mi (12.76 km)	600 yd (550 m)
EF2	Metal panels were ripped from two barns, one of which had its entire roof and part of an exterior wall ripped off. A house had most of its roof torn off, and another home sustained more minor roof damage. A large RV was tossed about 100 feet (30 m) and destroyed, and a four-person ATV was thrown as well. Many large trees were snapped or uprooted, and an old wooden barn was pushed over and twisted as well. The tornado damaged a house, an old RV, and some trees in the small community Stairtown at the end of its path. This was the first of eight tornadoes produced by this supercell.						
EF1	SW of Jarrell to Southern Prairie Dell	Williamson, Bell	TX	30.7736°N 97.6804°W	22:51–23:13	9.29 mi (14.95 km)	300 yd (270 m)
EF1	Several homes sustained significant roof damage, farm outbuildings were damaged or destroyed, and a large metal building had its doors blown out. A stone company also had its large doors blown out, a small metal building was demolished, a utility pole snapped at its base, and multiple trailers were rolled and destroyed. The tornado entered the south edge of Prairie Dell before dissipating, where trees and tree limbs were downed, and some metal fencing and a gate was blown over. This tornado intersected the path of the 1997 Jarrell F5 tornado.						
EF2	Southern Round Rock to NE of Granger to Vilas	Travis, Williamson, Bell	TX	30.4632°N 97.6845°W	22:54–23:47	34.62 mi (55.72 km)	600 yd (550 m)
EF2	A damaging high-end EF2 tornado impacted numerous structures as it touched down in the Austin suburb of Round Rock. Many homes were damaged as the tornado moved through multiple neighborhoods, some of which sustained roof and exterior wall loss. Several businesses and warehouses had broken windows, exterior façade damage, roofing blown off, and HVAC units torn off. Windows were shattered at the Kalahari indoor water park and hotel, cars were flipped in parking lots, and semi-trailers were overturned. A couple of homes that were under construction collapsed as the tornado exited Round Rock and impacted the northern edge of Hutto, then continued to the northeast and passed south of Granger. A few homes, outbuildings, and metal storage unit buildings were heavily damaged or destroyed in this area, including one home that was swept clean from its foundation. An older home on piers sustained total loss of its roof and exterior walls, with some interior walls destroyed and blown away as well. Trees and power poles were downed near Bartlett and in Vilas before the tornado dissipated. Sixteen people were injured.						
EF2	Sherwood Shores, TX to SW of Kingston, OK	Grayson (TX), Marshall (OK)	TX, OK	33.8407°N 96.8192°W	23:11–23:21	5.12 mi (8.24 km)	200 yd (180 m)
EF2	1 death – After the Gainesville EF1 tornado dissipated, this strong tornado touched down in Sherwood Shores, where numerous mobile homes were flipped or destroyed, a couple of site-built homes were also significantly damaged, and one person was killed. One house was shifted off of its foundation, while another lost a large section of its roof, along with a second-floor exterior wall. A shipping container was rolled, and outbuildings were damaged or destroyed as well. A total of 53 structures were destroyed, 27 had major damage, while 105 others sustained lesser damage in the Sherwood Shores area. The tornado crossed Lake Texoma into Oklahoma and struck the Buncombe Creek Marina, where many boats, docks, RVs, and mobile homes were thrown and destroyed. Some frame homes and metal warehouse structures also sustained major structural damage, numerous trees were snapped, and power lines were downed. Less severe damage to trees and outbuildings occurred at the end of the path. Eleven people were injured.						
EF0	Euless	Tarrant	TX	32.8473°N 97.0919°W	23:12–23:14	0.63 mi (1.01 km)	100 yd (91 m)
EF0	A brief and weak tornado touched down in Euless. Trees were snapped or downed, some of which fell on homes and caused minor structural damage.						
EF1	S of Kingston to NE of Milburn	Marshall	OK	33.97°N 96.714°W	23:29–23:41	10.13 mi (16.30 km)	200 yd (180 m)
EF1	This tornado touched down south of Kingston after the Sherwood Shores EF2 tornado dissipated. It moved to the northeast, causing damage to trees and structures along its path. A house near the beginning of the path had extensive roof damage. As the tornado moved through the east edge of Kingston, multiple homes sustained considerable damage, along with some metal buildings that had roof and wall panels pulled off. Additional damage to homes, outbuildings, and trees continued past Kington as the tornado approached and struck Little City, where mostly minor tree and structure damage occurred before it dissipated.						
EF2	NE of Webberville to NE of Elgin	Travis, Bastrop	TX	30.2524°N 97.4755°W	23:30–23:50	11.97 mi (19.26 km)	500 yd (460 m)
EF2	Numerous structures were damaged or destroyed by this high-end EF2 tornado, including within the southern and eastern fringes of Elgin. The tornado destroyed multiple outbuildings and manufactured homes, damaged many frame homes, snapped power poles and trees, and toppled metal truss electrical transmission towers. Two houses had their top floors destroyed, and a large metal-framed warehouse building also sustained major structural damage, including a collapsed wall and buckled roof purlins. The tornado was caught on video as it crossed US 290 and rolled a moving pickup truck onto its side, spun it around 360 degrees, and rolled it back upright, allowing the driver to continue driving down the road. In total, 109 residences and a business were damaged; 32 of those residences sustained major damage, while 20 residences and the business were destroyed. Three people were injured in a manufactured home that was rolled.						
EF0	Northern Carrollton	Denton	TX	33.0042°N 96.913°W	23:31–23:32	1.86 mi (2.99 km)	50 yd (46 m)
EF0	A small section of a roof and shingles were removed from an apartment building in the northern part of Carrollton, and two trees were snapped.						
EF0	E of Kingston	Marshall	OK	33.963°N 96.664°W	23:32–23:35	2.6 mi (4.2 km)	20 yd (18 m)
EF0	This was a satellite tornado of the Kingston EF1 tornado. Trees were damaged.						
EF1	Emet	Johnston	OK	34.142°N 96.587°W	23:43–23:43	7.13 mi (11.47 km)	200 yd (180 m)
EF1	This tornado, which was the final one produced by the Sherwood Shores supercell, damaged trees and the roofs of homes in Emet.						
EF0	NE of Elgin	Bastrop, Lee	TX	30.3667°N 97.2885°W	23:54–00:04	5.53 mi (8.90 km)	50 yd (46 m)
EF0	Minor roof damage to a residence occurred.						
EF1	N of Buckholts to SW of Burlington	Milam	TX	30.9303°N 97.1243°W	00:14–00:24	3.81 mi (6.13 km)	200 yd (180 m)
EF1	Two barns were severely damaged, with one losing most of its roof. A home lost most of its roof shingles, and two wooden power poles were snapped. A tree was also snapped in half.						
EF0	WSW of Rosebud	Falls	TX	31.0641°N 96.9967°W	00:25	0.39 mi (0.63 km)	30 yd (27 m)
EF0	Trees and power lines were damaged by this brief and weak tornado.						
EF1	S of Giddings	Lee	TX	30.1538°N 96.955°W	00:28–00:32	2.46 mi (3.96 km)	50 yd (46 m)
EF1	The roof of a barn was blown off, and the roofs of several metal structures and outbuildings were damaged. A fence was blown down, tree branches were broken, and the cross on the steeple of a church was bent. This was the second tornado produced by the Kingsbury supercell.						
EF0	NE of Groesbeck	Limestone	TX	31.5058°N 96.5759°W	01:08–01:18	11.8 mi (19.0 km)	100 yd (91 m)
EF0	The roofs were ripped from a small barn and two manufactured homes. Several trees, a few metal shelters, and a carport were also damaged. A large, anchored farm outbuilding was wrapped around a tree.						
EF0	Snook	Burleson	TX	30.4909°N 96.4715°W	01:35–01:36	1.01 mi (1.63 km)	500 yd (460 m)
EF0	The roofs of a couple homes, a garage door, and an apartment complex were damaged in town. This was the third tornado produced by the Kingsbury supercell.						
EF0	NNE of Snook	Burleson	TX	30.5422°N 96.4391°W	01:40–01:41	0.29 mi (0.47 km)	175 yd (160 m)
EF0	A small aluminum shed was destroyed at an aquatic facility. A few trees and power lines were downed as well. This was the fourth tornado produced by the Kingsbury supercell.						
EF1	NE of Bryan	Brazos	TX	30.7405°N 96.2008°W	02:05–02:06	0.39 mi (0.63 km)	175 yd (160 m)
EF1	A home was pushed off its block foundation and had its roof damaged. The trunks of trees were snapped as well. This was the fifth tornado produced by the Kingsbury supercell.						
EF1	Madisonville	Madison	TX	30.9357°N 95.9381°W	02:35–02:42	2.44 mi (3.93 km)	200 yd (180 m)
EF1	Several homes and a few businesses sustained considerable damage in Madisonville, including one business that sustained collapse of its brick facade. Several power poles were snapped in town as well. This was the sixth tornado produced by the Kingsbury supercell.						
EF2	Mapleton to NE of Crockett	Houston	TX	31.1346°N 95.675°W	03:10–03:30	19.07 mi (30.69 km)	200 yd (180 m)
EF2	1 death – This strong tornado first touched down in the small community of Mapleton, where a house had its roof torn off, outbuildings were destroyed, and trees were downed. Continuing to the northeast, the tornado snapped or uprooted numerous large trees and destroyed a couple of mobile homes. Three people were seriously injured when they were thrown from one of the mobile homes into an adjacent field. The tornado struck the north edge of Crockett before dissipating, where multiple homes were heavily damaged, including a few that had some roof and exterior wall loss. A convenience store was destroyed in this area as well. 10 people were injured.						
EF2	SSW of Gilmer to N of Ore City to W of Linden	Upshur, Marion, Morris, Cass	TX	32.6428°N 94.966°W	03:20–04:08	39.97 mi (64.33 km)	700 yd (640 m)
EF2	A long-tracked, strong tornado caused high-end EF2 damage along its path. Multiple frame homes had their roofs torn off, and a few sustained exterior wall loss as well, while a poorly anchored guest house was swept completely away behind a residence. One house was struck by a projectile, leaving a large hole in the side of the structure, while the entire second floor of a two-story home was ripped off and destroyed. Multiple RVs were thrown into the water at Lake O’ the Pines, and a bait shop had its roof torn off at that location. Numerous manufactured homes were completely destroyed, along with outbuildings and a metal storage building. Countless trees were snapped along the path, and seven people were injured.						
EF2	W of Linwood to Western Cushing to N of Brachfield	Cherokee, Nacogdoches, Rusk	TX	31.6591°N 95.0306°W	04:16–05:08	37.13 mi (59.75 km)	1,400 yd (1,300 m)
EF2	A large and strong tornado snapped or uprooted many thousands of trees along its path. The tornado impacted the western and northern outskirts of Cushing, where approximately 50 structures were damaged, including a church that was destroyed and multiple homes that sustained partial to complete roof loss. Elsewhere along the path, mobile homes were thrown and destroyed, and frame homes sustained significant damage. Metal truss electrical transmission towers were blown over, and numerous outbuildings were damaged or destroyed along the path. This was the seventh tornado produced by the Kingsbury supercell.						
EF1	SE of Douglassville	Cass	TX	33.1614°N 94.3085°W	04:21–04:23	1.82 mi (2.93 km)	150 yd (140 m)
EF1	A brief tornado embedded in a squall line snapped about 10 trees.						
EF1	SSW of Domino	Cass	TX	33.2148°N 94.1655°W	04:29–04:32	2.03 mi (3.27 km)	200 yd (180 m)
EF1	A tornado embedded in a squall line snapped approximately 30 trees and caused roof damage to manufactured homes.						

=== March 22 event ===
List of confirmed tornadoes – Tuesday, March 22, 2022
EF#	Location	County / Parish	State	Start Coord.	Time (UTC)	Path length	Max width
EF2	NE of Brachfield to SW of Beckville	Rusk, Panola	TX	32.0548°N 94.6089°W	05:08–05:25	11.92 mi (19.18 km)	500 yd (460 m)
EF2	This was the eighth and final tornado produced by the Kingsbury supercell. Multiple homes were significantly damaged, including one that sustained high-end EF2 damage, losing most of its roof and several exterior walls. Over 1,000 trees were snapped, outbuildings were damaged or destroyed, farming equipment was overturned, and one person was injured.						
EF1	S of Scottsville	Harrison	TX	32.371°N 94.2821°W	05:49–06:00	6.58 mi (10.59 km)	200 yd (180 m)
EF1	About 30 trees were snapped or uprooted. This was the eighth and last tornado produced by the Kingsbury supercell.						
EF1	W of Beasley	Fort Bend	TX	29.4886°N 96.0397°W	10:35–10:37	0.82 mi (1.32 km)	30 yd (27 m)
EF1	An RV was flipped, a house was heavily damaged, and a few trees were uprooted. Four people in the RV were injured.						
EF0	Eastern Danbury	Brazoria	TX	29.2286°N 95.3365°W	12:21–12:22	0.13 mi (0.21 km)	30 yd (27 m)
EF0	A brief tornado was captured on a security camera. Minor tree damage occurred at the east edge of town.						
EF1	NW of Delta, LA	Madison (LA), Warren (MS)	LA, MS	32.398°N 91.05°W	16:23–16:31	6.57 mi (10.57 km)	100 yd (91 m)
EF1	Several trees were snapped. The tornado path became inaccessible due to the Mississippi River.						
EF0	E of Peelers, MS	Madison (LA), Warren (MS)	LA, MS	32.48°N 91°W	16:29–16:31	0.58 mi (0.93 km)	50 yd (46 m)
EF0	A metal roof was ripped off, siding and fencing were damaged, and a few power poles were downed.						
EF0	NNE of Vicksburg	Warren	MS	32.4756°N 90.813°W	16:43–16:45	1.11 mi (1.79 km)	50 yd (46 m)
EF0	Trees were snapped, a small shed was blown apart, and a manufactured home had damage to its skirting.						
EF1	SE of Vicksburg to ENE of Edwards	Warren, Hinds	MS	32.28°N 90.8°W	16:58–17:13	14.84 mi (23.88 km)	350 yd (320 m)
EF1	This tornado impacted the town of Edwards, where several trees were downed and a few landed on structures. Many additional trees were downed elsewhere along the path, three outbuildings sustained significant roof damage, and homes and other outbuildings sustained damage from falling trees. One tree fell through the roof and wall of a house, causing significant damage.						
EFU	SW of Satartia	Yazoo	MS	32.6211°N 90.5901°W	17:04–17:05	0.73 mi (1.17 km)	50 yd (46 m)
EFU	A storm chaser documented a tornado on video. No known damage occurred.						
EF2	N of Edwards	Hinds	MS	32.366°N 90.6169°W	17:11–17:19	7.75 mi (12.47 km)	500 yd (460 m)
EF2	Several manufactured homes, outbuildings, houses, and a church suffered loss of roofing material. The most severe damage occurred to one home that had its entire roof removed. Two manufactured homes were shifted off their foundations, one of which was heavily damaged. Numerous trees were snapped or uprooted, and some power poles were snapped.						
EF2	N of Edwards to WSW of Flora	Hinds, Madison	MS	32.4839°N 90.5914°W	17:13–17:22	8.63 mi (13.89 km)	880 yd (800 m)
EF2	A strong tornado tracked through remote forested areas, where numerous large trees were snapped or uprooted along a wide swath. The tornado was accompanied by strong inflow winds up to 80 mph (130 km/h) which downed additional trees and utility poles.						
EF1	W of Flora	Hinds, Madison	MS	32.5176°N 90.4939°W	17:20–17:28	9.05 mi (14.56 km)	800 yd (730 m)
EF1	Numerous trees were downed and a house lost a large portion of its roof.						
EF1	NE of Bolton	Hinds	MS	32.3848°N 90.4129°W	17:24–17:31	3.33 mi (5.36 km)	300 yd (270 m)
EF1	Trees and a shed were damaged.						
EF1	N of Flora	Madison	MS	32.5676°N 90.3164°W	17:29–17:33	2.58 mi (4.15 km)	350 yd (320 m)
EF1	The roof was ripped off the back half of a manufactured home, and siding was ripped from its sides. A detached carport at an adjacent home was destroyed and blown across the yard. A large section of roofing material was stripped from another manufactured home. Trees were snapped and uprooted as well.						
EF1	ENE of Bentonia	Yazoo, Madison	MS	32.6583°N 90.3375°W	17:30–17:39	5.51 mi (8.87 km)	600 yd (550 m)
EF1	Trees were snapped and uprooted along the path.						
EF1	SE of Eden	Yazoo	MS	32.8692°N 90.2486°W	17:35–17:37	1.4 mi (2.3 km)	550 yd (500 m)
EF1	Numerous trees were snapped and uprooted, and a house had a large section of its metal roof removed.						
EF1	W of Ridgeland	Madison	MS	32.4212°N 90.2125°W	17:42–17:48	5 mi (8.0 km)	250 yd (230 m)
EF1	Several trees and tree limbs were downed, including one tree that fell on a home and a barn.						
EF1	NW of Canton	Yazoo	MS	32.7092°N 90.1494°W	17:44–17:51	6.53 mi (10.51 km)	200 yd (180 m)
EF1	Tree damage occurred along the path, with the most significant occurring near Highway 16 where numerous trees were downed.						
EF1	NW of Lexington	Holmes	MS	33.119°N 90.1513°W	17:49–17:57	7.43 mi (11.96 km)	700 yd (640 m)
EF1	Numerous trees were snapped or uprooted. Sporadic structural damage also occurred, mainly to outbuildings.						
EF0	W of Crystal Springs	Copiah	MS	31.958°N 90.4496°W	17:49–17:57	4.87 mi (7.84 km)	100 yd (91 m)
EF0	The metal roof was ripped off a business. Multiple trees were downed as well, one of which fell onto a house.						
EF1	NW of Pickens to Goodman to W of Sallis	Holmes, Attala	MS	32.9109°N 90.0413°W	17:52–18:08	14.2 mi (22.9 km)	700 yd (640 m)
EF1	A high-end EF1 tornado caused considerable damage in Goodman, where extensive tree damage occurred, power poles were snapped, an apartment building had part of its roof torn off, and some outbuilding structures were destroyed. Significant roof damage was inflicted to multiple structures, including several buildings on the campus of Holmes Community College. A gas station was heavily damaged, with the canopy being destroyed and the convenience store losing its metal roofing. In other areas outside of town, homes sustained minor damage, a shed was destroyed, a travel trailer was lofted across a roadway, fencing and a hunting stand was blown over, and trees were snapped or uprooted.						
EF1	SSE of Pickens	Madison	MS	32.79°N 89.97°W	17:59–18:04	6.43 mi (10.35 km)	200 yd (180 m)
EF1	Many trees were snapped, a house had its porch awning torn off, and a large barn had a large section of its roof blown off.						
EF1	W of Sallis	Attala	MS	33.026°N 89.7981°W	18:09–18:11	1.53 mi (2.46 km)	100 yd (91 m)
EF1	Numerous trees were downed.						
EF1	N of Sallis	Attala	MS	33.0779°N 89.7654°W	18:14–18:18	3.35 mi (5.39 km)	200 yd (180 m)
EF1	Numerous trees were snapped or downed.						
EF0	ENE of Coila to SE of Carrollton	Carroll	MS	33.4021°N 89.933°W	18:16–18:23	6.34 mi (10.20 km)	400 yd (370 m)
EF0	A covered awning was damaged near a manufactured home, and intermittent tree damage occurred along the path.						
EF0	S of Lena	Scott	MS	32.5338°N 89.5993°W	18:45–18:47	1.57 mi (2.53 km)	100 yd (91 m)
EF0	Multiple trees were damaged or uprooted, and an old manufactured home was damaged.						
EF0	N of Sylvarena	Smith	MS	32.1109°N 89.4196°W	19:34–19:37	1.52 mi (2.45 km)	100 yd (91 m)
EF0	A couple of trees were damaged, and one was uprooted.						
EF3	SW of De Kalb	Kemper	MS	32.6016°N 88.8976°W	19:35–19:46	9.21 mi (14.82 km)	800 yd (730 m)
EF3	A strong tornado snapped or uprooted numerous large trees in the Damascus area, and entire stands of trees were mowed down in some areas. One tree fell on a mobile home, destroying the structure. A frame home was destroyed with only a few walls left partially standing, and a mobile home was obliterated after it was ripped from its anchors and thrown 100 yards (91 m) through the air into trees. A horse trailer and hay bales were also thrown, and outbuildings were damaged or destroyed, including one that was completely destroyed with its debris strewn downwind.						
EF1	S of West Point to WNW of New Hamilton	Clay, Monroe	MS	33.57°N 88.6414°W	20:04–20:20	15.47 mi (24.90 km)	650 yd (590 m)
EF1	A few homes sustained minor damage, many trees were downed, and several power poles were snapped. Minor roof damage occurred to buildings at a livestock facility. One person was injured in Clay County while trying to run from a vehicle to a house.						
EF1	SE of Macon	Noxubee	MS	33.0475°N 88.5701°W	20:17–20:34	11.61 mi (18.68 km)	450 yd (410 m)
EF1	A storage shed and a carport were damaged, and about nine power poles were snapped. Trees and tree limbs were downed as well.						
EF0	Toomsuba	Lauderdale	MS	32.4093°N 88.5061°W	21:04–21:06	1.47 mi (2.37 km)	25 yd (23 m)
EF0	A house sustained minor roof damage, and some minor tree damage occurred in town.						
EF2	E of Cyril to S of Yantley	Choctaw	AL	32.1601°N 88.4028°W	21:58–22:04	4.33 mi (6.97 km)	300 yd (270 m)
EF2	A manufactured home was destroyed after being lifted and rolled, and sheet metal debris from the structure was wrapped around trees. Numerous large trees were snapped or uprooted, a power pole was downed, and a house sustained minor roof damage as well. In November 2023, this tornado was reanalyzed and had its path length adjusted from 2.45 mi (3.94 km) to 4.33 mi (6.97 km).						
EF0	NW of Collinwood	Wayne	TN	35.2°N 87.78°W	22:05–22:07	1.93 mi (3.11 km)	200 yd (180 m)
EF0	A high-end EF0 tornado moved due north, blowing down a few trees and causing some minor damage to outbuildings around a home. Continuing northward, the tornado strengthened and blew down dozens of trees in all directions, with strong spiral and convergent patterns noted in the tree fall pattern. Intermittent tree damage continued before the tornado lifted. This tornado was discovered in May 2023 using high-resolution satellite imagery.						
EF0	NW of Rogersville	Lauderdale	AL	34.8657°N 87.3377°W	22:29–22:34	1.85 mi (2.98 km)	140 yd (130 m)
EF0	Several trees were damaged, two of which fell on structures. The attached garage at one house had an exterior wall blown in, allowing winds to uplift a portion of the roof of home. Power lines were downed as well.						
EF1	NE of Shubuta	Clarke	MS	31.9095°N 88.6071°W	22:34–22:39	3.67 mi (5.91 km)	100 yd (91 m)
EF1	Numerous trees were damaged or uprooted, a manufactured home had its tin roof peeled off, and a metal shed was demolished as well.						
EF0	Thornhill	Greene	AL	32.6906°N 87.9379°W	23:00–23:02	0.88 mi (1.42 km)	150 yd (140 m)
EF0	Trees were downed, and a hunting blind was overturned.						
EF0	NNE of Thornhill	Greene	AL	32.7238°N 87.9136°W	23:04–23:08	3.27 mi (5.26 km)	250 yd (230 m)
EF0	A chicken house sustained roof damage, and a few shingles were blown off a house too. Several trees were downed.						
EF0	Williams Camp	Tuscaloosa	AL	33.5094°N 87.3777°W	23:21–23:25	0.97 mi (1.56 km)	175 yd (160 m)
EF0	A brief tornado downed trees and caused minor damage to several homes and a couple of boat houses.						
EF1	NW of Lou	Choctaw	AL	31.9457°N 88.2364°W	23:33–23:38	3.05 mi (4.91 km)	130 yd (120 m)
EF1	A manufactured home was shifted off its foundation, with its carport and a nearby shed being heavily damaged. The metal roof was lifted off the back of a nearby house, causing tornadic winds to blow out the front windows, walls, and part of the roof structure. Metal from the house was wrapped around trees. Numerous trees were snapped or uprooted along the path as well. In November 2023, this tornado was reanalyzed and had its path length adjusted from 0.19 mi (0.31 km) to 3.05 mi (4.91 km).						
EF0	Southeastern Moundville	Hale, Tuscaloosa	AL	32.98°N 87.63°W	23:38–23:42	3.13 mi (5.04 km)	430 yd (390 m)
EF0	The roofs of a barn and business in town were damaged. Numerous trees were uprooted, at least two of which fell on a permanent house and a manufactured home.						
EF3	Gretna to Arabi to New Orleans East	Jefferson, Orleans, St. Bernard	LA	29.8849°N 90.0535°W	00:21–00:37	11.47 mi (18.46 km)	320 yd (290 m)
EF3	1 death – See section on this tornado – Two people were injured.						
EF1	N of Lacombe	St. Tammany	LA	30.2617°N 89.957°W	00:25–00:33	15.64 mi (25.17 km)	100 yd (91 m)
EF1	This low-end EF1 tornado touched down along US 190 on the north shore of Lake Pontchartrain and moved northeast, north of Lacombe. Several homes sustained minor roof damage, a shed was destroyed, and dozens of trees were downed.						
EF0	W of Maylene	Bibb, Shelby	AL	33.1858°N 87.0408°W	02:08–02:13	2.76 mi (4.44 km)	100 yd (91 m)
EF0	Many trees were downed in forested areas roughly halfway between Woodstock and Maylene.						
EF1	WSW of Summerdale to Robertsdale	Baldwin	AL	30.4798°N 87.7198°W	04:07–04:16	5.68 mi (9.14 km)	30 yd (27 m)
EF1	Near Summerdale, a storage building sustained damage to its walls and had roofing material removed. Trees were snapped, gravel was blown off a road surface, and irrigation pivots were flipped over. Two homes sustained minor damage as the tornado continued north of town. A few businesses sustained minor roof damage and tree limbs were downed in Robertsdale before the tornado dissipated, and a shed was overturned in town as well.						

=== March 23 event ===
List of confirmed tornadoes – Wednesday, March 23, 2022
EF#	Location	County / Parish	State	Start Coord.	Time (UTC)	Path length	Max width
EF0	W of Statenville	Echols	GA	30.7004°N 83.0635°W	18:53–18:54	0.51 mi (0.82 km)	25 yd (23 m)
EF0	Single-wide manufactured homes were damaged, and tree limbs were downed.						
EF0	W of Clarksville	Warren, Clinton	OH	39.3919°N 84.0061°W	19:42–19:45	1.71 mi (2.75 km)	50 yd (46 m)
EF0	A barn collapsed, a pop-up camper was flipped, and trees were snapped or uprooted. A house had its doors blown in.						
EFU	N of Convoy	Van Wert	OH	40.9651°N 84.7032°W	21:31–21:33	0.28 mi (0.45 km)	20 yd (18 m)
EFU	A landspout tornado was captured on video. No damage was reported.						
EF0	SW of Willard	Huron	OH	41.0090°N 82.8065°W	22:11–22:13	0.81 mi (1.30 km)	100 yd (91 m)
EF0	A metal barn was damaged, a fifth wheel trailer was pushed, and garage doors were caved in.						
EF2	W of Pickens	Pickens	SC	34.854°N 82.828°W	00:56–01:07	6.25 mi (10.06 km)	440 yd (400 m)
EF2	Hundreds of trees were downed, including one that fell on a mobile home. A site-built home sustained major roof and exterior wall damage, and a manufactured home was torn in two and rolled off its foundation. Another home had its metal roofing peeled off, and an outbuilding was destroyed. Three people sustained minor injuries.						
EF0	WNW of Six Mile	Pickens	SC	34.851°N 82.894°W	01:29–01:30	0.09 mi (0.14 km)	20 yd (18 m)
EF0	A few trees were snapped or uprooted by this brief, weak tornado.						
EF2	NNE of Gladesboro	Carroll	VA	36.6922°N 80.5873°W	01:45–01:47	1.92 mi (3.09 km)	125 yd (114 m)
EF2	A two-story home was shifted off its foundation and had its roof torn off, and a modular home lost half of its roof. Numerous trees were snapped or uprooted along the path.						
EF1	NW of Taylorsville	Alexander	NC	35.954°N 81.301°W	02:59–03:09	6.17 mi (9.93 km)	150 yd (140 m)
EF1	Dozens of trees were downed and a small barn was completely destroyed, while a second barn sustained moderate damage. A house suffered roof and siding damage, and a double-wide manufactured home sustained severe damage to its exterior.						

=== March 29 event ===
List of confirmed tornadoes – Tuesday, March 29, 2022
EF#	Location	County / Parish	State	Start Coord.	Time (UTC)	Path length	Max width
EF1	SSE of Valley Falls to S of Nortonville	Jefferson	KS	39.28°N 95.43°W	00:56–01:06	9.86 mi (15.87 km)	10 yd (9.1 m)
EF1	A tornado embedded within a larger area of damaging straight-line winds damaged outbuildings and farm equipment. One outbuilding was destroyed at the end of path.						
EF1	Eastern St. Joseph	Buchanan	MO	39.7806°N 94.7842°W	01:54–01:55	0.3 mi (0.48 km)	40 yd (37 m)
EF1	A brief tornado touched down in the eastern part of St. Joseph. A school building had part of its roof torn off, a house sustained significant structural damage, and a few trees and tree limbs were downed at a local park.						

=== March 30 event ===
List of confirmed tornadoes – Wednesday, March 30, 2022
EF#	Location	County / Parish	State	Start Coord.	Time (UTC)	Path length	Max width
EF3	Northern Fayetteville to Springdale	Washington	AR	36.122°N 94.156°W	09:04–09:12	5.2 mi (8.4 km)	350 yd (320 m)
EF3	This strong tornado developed just southwest of the Northwest Arkansas Mall in the northern part of Fayetteville, near Johnson. An automotive business was destroyed, while other businesses and a few homes sustained minor to moderate damage as the tornado passed near the mall. A van was rolled and a cell tower was blown over before the tornado entered Springdale, where vehicles were flipped and dozens of homes were damaged, some significantly with partial to total roof loss. The most intense damage occurred at George Elementary School, which had part of its roof peeled back and sustained total collapse of its metal gymnasium building, and at a large Nilfisk distribution warehouse that was largely flattened, with both areas earning a low-end EF3 rating. A hangar at Springdale Municipal Airport was destroyed, and other buildings were damaged on the east side of the airport. A couple of businesses were heavily damaged, and additional homes sustained minor roof damage before the tornado dissipated. Many trees and power poles were snapped along the path, and debris from Springdale was blown northward into Benton County. Seven people were injured.						
EF1	McLendon-Chisholm	Rockwall	TX	32.834°N 96.3474°W	09:34–09:36	0.49 mi (0.79 km)	50 yd (46 m)
EF1	A brief tornado embedded within a larger area of straight-line winds caused significant damage to the top floor of a house, moved several trailers, and destroyed a shed. Another home sustained collapse of its porte-cochère, and the attached garage had its roof torn off. Poles were bent at a basketball court, and a few trees were downed.						
EF0	Adamson	Pittsburg	OK	34.922°N 95.551°W	09:39–09:40	0.6 mi (0.97 km)	100 yd (91 m)
EF0	Several houses, outbuildings, and a manufactured home sustained minor damage in Adamson. Trees were snapped or uprooted, and multiple trailers were rolled.						
EF1	NW of Clarksville	Red River	TX	33.6486°N 95.1559°W	11:25–11:29	3.03 mi (4.88 km)	100 yd (91 m)
EF1	Metal panels were ripped off a barn and thrown up to 300 yd (270 m) away. The roof of another barn and a home were damaged, and trees were downed along the path.						
EF1	Harmony	Johnson	AR	35.5362°N 93.5756°W	12:47–12:53	3.46 mi (5.57 km)	400 yd (370 m)
EF1	Many trees and tree limbs were damaged or snapped in and around town, and there was also some light roof damage to some structures.						
EF1	SE of Hemphill	Sabine	TX	31.2925°N 93.8314°W	16:16–16:17	0.95 mi (1.53 km)	100 yd (91 m)
EF1	One outbuilding was destroyed and several others were damaged. Trees were also uprooted. Lack of road access prevented additional surveying.						
EF1	WSW of Toledo Bend Dam	Newton	TX	31.1491°N 93.6336°W	16:41–16:45	1.92 mi (3.09 km)	100 yd (91 m)
EF1	Ten homes were damaged near Toledo Bend Reservoir, several of which sustained significant roof damage. A couple more homes were damaged by falling trees, while garages and boat houses were severely damaged as well.						
EF0	Powhatan	Natchitoches	LA	31.8748°N 93.2103°W	16:53–16:54	1.21 mi (1.95 km)	100 yd (91 m)
EF0	About 15 to 20 tree branches were downed in and around Powhatan, and panels were ripped from three chicken houses.						
EF0	S of Powhatan to Campti	Natchitoches	LA	31.8656°N 93.2078°W	16:53–16:59	5.49 mi (8.84 km)	100 yd (91 m)
EF0	Many tree branches were downed along the path.						
EF1	W of Goldonna	Natchitoches	LA	32.0323°N 93.0364°W	17:05–17:08	3.67 mi (5.91 km)	200 yd (180 m)
EF1	Trees were snapped or uprooted, and the roofs of a house and barn were damaged.						
EF1	W of Hodge	Bienville	LA	32.2535°N 92.822°W	17:20–17:22	1.74 mi (2.80 km)	400 yd (370 m)
EF1	Numerous trees were snapped or uprooted.						
EF0	S of Melrose	Natchitoches	LA	31.584°N 93.0073°W	17:22–17:24	2.67 mi (4.30 km)	50 yd (46 m)
EF0	A couple of tree limbs were downed by this weak tornado.						
EF1	NW of Hodge	Jackson	LA	32.2813°N 92.7414°W	17:28–17:29	0.29 mi (0.47 km)	200 yd (180 m)
EF1	This brief tornado heavily damaged the side of an outbuilding and snapped or uprooted many trees. The tornado may have continued into an inaccessible area.						
EF1	S of Simpson	Vernon	LA	31.1854°N 93.0299°W	17:37–17:41	2.08 mi (3.35 km)	85 yd (78 m)
EF1	The roof of a manufactured home and several trees were damaged. A metal building had its roof torn off as well.						
EF1	W of Eros	Jackson	LA	32.3883°N 92.5378°W	17:42–17:43	0.67 mi (1.08 km)	500 yd (460 m)
EF1	Many trees were snapped or uprooted by this brief tornado.						
EF1	NW of Eros	Jackson	LA	32.4227°N 92.5223°W	17:44–17:49	4.21 mi (6.78 km)	200 yd (180 m)
EF1	Numerous trees were snapped or uprooted. The roof of a manufactured home sustained significant damage.						
EF1	SW of Girard to NNE of Rayville	Richland	LA	32.4718°N 91.8204°W	18:53–19:01	7.37 mi (11.86 km)	1,000 yd (910 m)
EF1	In Girard, power lines were downed, and a couple sheds were damaged. Several homes sustained roof and fascia damage north of Rayville, and a couple sheds were destroyed. Numerous trees were downed along the path.						
EF0	SSE of Rayville	Richland	LA	32.3733°N 91.7256°W	19:03–19:06	1.78 mi (2.86 km)	25 yd (23 m)
EF0	This small tornado tore much of the roof off a large metal barn, destroyed two carports, and downed several trees, one of which fell on a home.						
EF1	ENE of Winnsboro	Franklin	LA	32.1463°N 91.6868°W	19:10–19:16	6.79 mi (10.93 km)	350 yd (320 m)
EF1	Several homes sustained minor roof and fascia damage, a mobile home was damaged, and a shed was destroyed. Several trees were downed, with one large tree falling on a home.						
EF2	Southern Tallulah, LA to NE of Eagle Bend, MS	Madison (LA), Warren (MS)	LA, MS	32.3938°N 91.1901°W	19:51–20:09	17.27 mi (27.79 km)	300 yd (270 m)
EF2	In Tallulah, a school suffered considerable damage and lost a large portion of its roof, homes sustained varying degrees of roof damage, and several mobile homes were damaged, one of which was significantly damaged after being pushed off its blocks. A brick arch was destroyed at a cemetery, and metal buildings were heavily damaged at a baseball field in town. Outside of Tallulah, several irrigation pivots were overturned and a tractor shed was demolished. In Mississippi, some structures sustained damage to metal roofs and carports. Large trees, power poles, and fences were downed along the path as well, including one tree that fell through a house. The tornado crossed the Mississippi/Louisiana state line three times.						
EF1	WSW of Winstonville to S of Duncan	Bolivar	MS	33.902°N 90.8206°W	20:19–20:26	7.92 mi (12.75 km)	450 yd (410 m)
EF1	Several houses sustained exterior and roof damage, including the collapse of their chimneys, carports, and metal siding. A small farm outbuilding suffered roof damage, while trees and wooden power poles were snapped.						
EF1	Cleveland	Bolivar	MS	33.7434°N 90.7231°W	20:31–20:32	0.96 mi (1.54 km)	75 yd (69 m)
EF1	Several houses and businesses were damaged in Cleveland, including a few structures that lost portions of their roofs. A car dealership and hair salon had their windows shattered, and glass from the salon injured one person. A gas station canopy and metal outbuilding were also damaged.						
EF1	NNW of Edwards to NNW of Bolton	Warren, Hinds	MS	32.4563°N 90.6253°W	20:41–20:47	5.97 mi (9.61 km)	100 yd (91 m)
EF1	Numerous trees were snapped or uprooted by this tornado, which crossed the path of an EF2 tornado from just eight days prior.						
EF1	NNW of Bentonia to ESE of Eden	Yazoo	MS	32.7443°N 90.4030°W	20:58–21:17	16.63 mi (26.76 km)	700 yd (640 m)
EF1	Numerous trees were snapped or uprooted, some of which were downed onto a manufactured home. Homes, outbuildings, and barns sustained roof damage. One shed was completely demolished. The tornado crossed the damage path of a tornado just a week prior.						
EF1	S of Cruger to ESE of Sidon	Holmes, Carroll	MS	33.2742°N 90.2428°W	21:21–21:31	11.53 mi (18.56 km)	1,700 yd (1,600 m)
EF1	This large tornado overturned a center pivot irrigation system and snapped or uprooted numerous trees. Two homes had portions of their roofs removed. A manufactured home was demolished, with a man inside being thrown and injured. Several power poles were downed, and a small shed and a grain storage bin were damaged. A metal building had a large roll-up door blown inward, and a portion of the back of the building was blown outward.						
EF1	Midway to Byram	Hinds	MS	32.1673°N 90.3886°W	21:26–21:36	6.44 mi (10.36 km)	350 yd (320 m)
EF1	Numerous trees were snapped or uprooted as the tornado passed through the community of Spring Ridge, including one large tree that fell through a house.						
EF1	Pope to W of Burgess	Panola	MS	34.211°N 89.945°W	21:37–21:56	16.2 mi (26.1 km)	200 yd (180 m)
EF1	Many trees, power poles, and power lines were downed in Pope, including a tree that fell onto a home. Large trees were snapped elsewhere, a mobile home was severely damaged, and several frame homes sustained extensive roof and siding damage.						
EF1	Jackson	Hinds	MS	32.2821°N 90.2274°W	21:41–21:45	2.94 mi (4.73 km)	350 yd (320 m)
EF1	This tornado was broadcast live on local TV news by weather cameras as it moved through parts of downtown Jackson. About a dozen homes had minor to moderate damage, and several businesses sustained roof damage. Numerous trees, fences, and power lines were downed. One person was injured.						
EF1	N of Jackson to NE of Flowood	Hinds, Rankin	MS	32.3336°N 90.2051°W	21:43–21:56	8.46 mi (13.62 km)	200 yd (180 m)
EF1	This tornado tracked along a discontinuous path, causing sporadic tree and house damage. Falling trees caused additional damage to structures. Multiple utility lines were downed. A large portion of the outfield wall to the Smith–Wills Stadium was downed.						
EF1	WNW of Vaiden to S of Winona	Carroll	MS	33.351°N 89.8066°W	21:52–22:00	6.11 mi (9.83 km)	250 yd (230 m)
EF1	Many trees were snapped or uprooted along the path.						
EF1	SE of Canton	Madison	MS	32.543°N 89.9943°W	21:56–22:03	5.26 mi (8.47 km)	350 yd (320 m)
EF1	Trees were damaged and uprooted.						
EF0	NW of Thompsonville	Franklin	IL	37.9507°N 88.8089°W	22:23–22:31	4.05 mi (6.52 km)	100 yd (91 m)
EF0	Three outbuildings were partially damaged, a few houses sustained shingle damage, and trees were snapped or uprooted.						
EF1	NE of Ellard to N of Sarepta	Calhoun	MS	34.0492°N 89.3786°W	22:24–22:32	7.63 mi (12.28 km)	100 yd (91 m)
EF1	Twenty power poles were destroyed, several homes and outbuildings were damaged, and a manufactured home was shifted. Numerous trees were snapped or uprooted.						
EF2	NNW of Redwater to SSE of Ethel	Leake, Attala	MS	32.8799°N 89.5716°W	22:32–22:43	10.65 mi (17.14 km)	1,200 yd (1,100 m)
EF2	This large and significant tornado destroyed multiple sheds and snapped or uprooted thousands of large trees along its path. Several homes and a church had damage to their roofs, including a few structures that sustained considerable roof damage.						
EF0	SSW of Fairfield	Wayne	IL	38.3586°N 88.3813°W	23:01–23:02	0.3 mi (0.48 km)	50 yd (46 m)
EF0	This very brief tornado damaged shingles on a few homes. A couple outbuildings sustained minor damage. Some large tree branches were snapped.						
EF1	ENE of Norris City to Carmi	White	IL	38.0077°N 88.2352°W	23:11–23:18	6.62 mi (10.65 km)	400 yd (370 m)
EF1	At least a dozen homes and a church had shingles torn off in Carmi, a sign was blown over, and a storage shed at the edge of town was destroyed. Additional damage occurred outside of town as well, where a few sheds and outbuildings were damaged or destroyed, a couple of homes sustained minor roof damage, and a small boat was blown into a pond. Trees and power poles and lines were downed along the path as well.						
EF1	Roseland	Tangipahoa	LA	30.7557°N 90.5106°W	23:12–23:20	6.09 mi (9.80 km)	150 yd (140 m)
EF1	Trees and tree limbs were downed in Roseland. Several homes and mobile homes were significantly damaged outside of town, including one double-wide mobile home that was lifted off of its blocks and had its roof torn off. Trees were snapped or uprooted, outbuildings were destroyed, and a wooden post was speared through the windshield of a vehicle.						
EF1	NE of Denmark to Jackson	Madison	TN	35.57°N 88.948°W	23:18–23:27	8.49 mi (13.66 km)	175 yd (160 m)
EF1	Several homes sustained roof damage near the beginning of the path, a few of which were heavily damaged. At a manufacturing facility, the exterior wall of a large metal building was peeled off its frame, and several large roll-up doors were blown in. Several metal power poles were bent at that location, and several businesses were damaged farther along the path. The tornado then entered Jackson before dissipating, where Jackson-Madison County General Hospital was damaged, the roof was blown off a nearby nursing home, and a light pole was damaged at a baseball field. Numerous trees were snapped or uprooted along the path.						
EF1	N of Oakfield to ENE of Medina	Madison, Gibson	TN	35.7456°N 88.7898°W	23:31–23:38	7.09 mi (11.41 km)	250 yd (230 m)
EF1	Trees and outbuildings were damaged along the path.						
EF1	Huntingdon	Carroll	TN	35.937°N 88.516°W	23:50–00:00	9.22 mi (14.84 km)	150 yd (140 m)
EF1	Several homes sustained roof and window damage, and a metal building in town was damaged as well. Many trees were downed in and around Huntingdon.						
EF1	S of Saint Wendel	Posey, Vanderburgh	IN	38.0666°N 87.7176°W	23:59–00:00	1.01 mi (1.63 km)	75 yd (69 m)
EF1	Two homes sustained shingle and roof gutter damage. Dozens of trees were snapped or uprooted.						
EF0	SE of Aberdeen	Monroe	MS	33.7970°N 88.5221°W	00:16–00:26	7.67 mi (12.34 km)	150 yd (140 m)
EF0	Trees were snapped and uprooted by this tornado.						
EF1	SW of West Hattiesburg	Lamar	MS	31.2645°N 89.4659°W	00:44–00:47	1.85 mi (2.98 km)	425 yd (389 m)
EF1	Trees were snapped and uprooted, and a house sustained roof damage.						
EF0	Purvis	Lamar, Forrest	MS	31.145°N 89.4044°W	00:44–00:52	7.29 mi (11.73 km)	25 yd (23 m)
EF0	This weak tornado removed a portion of a gas station canopy in town, caused minor tree damage, and downed a sign. A portion of a metal roof was blown off a structure as well.						
EF0	Big Branch	St. Tammany	LA	30.3204°N 90.0182°W	00:45–00:48	1.74 mi (2.80 km)	50 yd (46 m)
EF0	A waterspout moved ashore from Lake Pontchartrain, downing a few trees in the Big Branch Marsh National Wildlife Refuge. This tornado's path was within 100 yd (91 m) of an EF1 tornado that was part of a separate tornado outbreak over a week prior.						
EF0	N of Enterprise	Clarke	MS	32.186°N 88.8433°W	01:01–01:04	2.13 mi (3.43 km)	125 yd (114 m)
EF0	A home had a small section of its metal roofing removed, and a second house sustained minor shingle damage. Trees were damaged and uprooted as well.						
EF1	ENE of Enterprise	Clarke, Lauderdale	MS	32.2233°N 88.7066°W	01:06–01:13	3.66 mi (5.89 km)	50 yd (46 m)
EF1	A majority of the wooden fence around the Clarkdale Attendance Center softball field was knocked down. A small portion of metal roofing was lifted off a building, and the awning over the dugout was ripped off, causing the structure to fail. A section of bleachers were damaged, and a small metal building was lifted off its foundation. Several trees were snapped as well. This same area was hit by an EF2 tornado the following month on April 13, 2022.						
EF2	NE of Macon	Noxubee	MS	33.1008°N 88.4691°W	01:08–01:20	10.99 mi (17.69 km)	400 yd (370 m)
EF2	This high-end EF2 tornado tore a large portion of the roof from a house, and damaged or destroyed several metal storage buildings and outbuildings. Concrete pillars from one outbuilding, which were rebared into a steel plate, were pulled from the ground and one was missing. A mobile home was rolled and destroyed; two people inside were thrown into a wooded area and injured. Another mobile home sustained minor roof damage, while chicken houses were damaged, and numerous trees and power poles were snapped.						
EF2	SW of Maxie to WSW of Janice	Forrest, Perry	MS	30.9197°N 89.2525°W	01:11–01:22	11.26 mi (18.12 km)	500 yd (460 m)
EF2	Numerous large trees were snapped or uprooted, several homes sustained roof damage, and an RV was rolled. Several outbuildings suffered extensive damage as well.						
EF1	SE of Marion	Lauderdale	MS	32.3415°N 88.5384°W	01:24–01:34	6.64 mi (10.69 km)	200 yd (180 m)
EF1	Numerous trees were snapped or uprooted, power lines were downed, and an old gas station canopy was toppled.						
EF1	S of Toomsuba	Lauderdale	MS	32.3844°N 88.4942°W	01:31–01:37	3.88 mi (6.24 km)	250 yd (230 m)
EF1	This tornado began just south of the previous one, causing significant structural damage to the roof and exterior wall of a manufactured home. A shed had tin ripped off and its cinder block walls were shifted. Numerous trees were snapped or uprooted.						
EF1	SW of Woodwards	Wayne	MS	31.6558°N 88.71°W	01:43–01:45	0.47 mi (0.76 km)	50 yd (46 m)
EF1	This brief tornado partially uplifted the roof deck and ripped off shingles from a house. Several trees were snapped or uprooted.						
EF1	SSW of Woodwards	Wayne	MS	31.6636°N 88.6886°W	01:45–01:47	0.21 mi (0.34 km)	50 yd (46 m)
EF1	Multiple trees were snapped or uprooted, two of which landed on nearby houses. A manufactured home also sustained damage to its roof.						
EF2	McLain	Perry, Greene	MS	31.0954°N 88.8476°W	01:46–01:49	2.05 mi (3.30 km)	250 yd (230 m)
EF2	This strong tornado struck McLain, where homes had carports and metal roofing torn off, one of which lost most of its roof. A church sustained roof damage, and a single-story apartment building in town had its entire roof ripped off and was partially destroyed, though the structure was poorly constructed. Some chicken houses were destroyed and sheds were significantly damaged, with sheet metal wrapped around trees. Numerous large trees were snapped or uprooted, some of which fell on houses, and a manufactured home was rolled onto its side.						
EF1	Northwestern Waynesboro	Wayne	MS	31.6797°N 88.6714°W	01:47–01:50	1.88 mi (3.03 km)	30 yd (27 m)
EF1	The exterior cinder-block wall of a small car wash was partially collapsed. Numerous trees were snapped or uprooted, and other structures in town sustained minor roof damage.						
EF1	NNE of York to Northern Livingston	Sumter	AL	32.5479°N 88.2675°W	01:51–02:02	5.62 mi (9.04 km)	600 yd (550 m)
EF1	Swaths of trees were snapped or uprooted by this tornado, including multiple trees that were downed in the northern part Livingston shortly before the tornado dissipated.						
EF1	NW of Denham	Wayne	MS	31.6648°N 88.542°W	01:55–01:56	0.27 mi (0.43 km)	50 yd (46 m)
EF1	This brief tornado caused minor roof damage to homes and snapped or uprooted several trees. A medium-sized storage building lost half its roofing material.						
EF1	S of Gordo to NE of Echola	Pickens, Tuscaloosa	AL	33.2126°N 87.9089°W	02:02–02:21	16.59 mi (26.70 km)	450 yd (410 m)
EF1	This tornado downed numerous trees, some of which fell on houses. Homes, barns, and outbuildings were damaged, and some chicken houses were damaged or destroyed.						
EF1	WNW of Tishabee to SE of Allison	Greene	AL	32.6462°N 88.0263°W	02:10–02:21	8.81 mi (14.18 km)	275 yd (251 m)
EF1	Many trees were snapped or uprooted, some of which damaged manufactured homes upon falling. Two manufactured homes were destroyed, and additional houses and farm buildings were damaged.						
EF2	NNW of Silas to SE of Myrtlewood	Choctaw, Marengo	AL	31.8259°N 88.3385°W	02:12–02:57	39.32 mi (63.28 km)	1,350 yd (1,230 m)
EF2	Multiple trees and power lines were downed, and a few homes sustained roof damage in Choctaw County. The most intense damage occurred as the tornado crossed the Tombigbee River into southwestern parts of Marengo County, causing significant damage near Nanafalia. Hundreds of trees were snapped or uprooted, and a manufactured home was completely destroyed, with the undercarriage rolled at least 30 yards (27 m) from its foundation. A brick home sustained roof damage due to winds and a falling tree, and another house lost large portions of its roof and exterior walls. More homes sustained minor damage, and an abandoned manufactured home was rolled before the tornado dissipated. In November 2023, this tornado was reanalyzed and had its path length in Choctaw County adjusted from 18.27 mi (29.40 km) to 20.16 mi (32.44 km) due to notable tree damage and defoliation of vegetation noted on Sentinel satellite imagery.						
EF2	S of Marion to E of Sprott	Perry	AL	32.5475°N 87.2944°W	02:33–02:41	6 mi (9.7 km)	620 yd (570 m)
EF2	A large swath of trees was completely mowed down in a remote forested area as a result of this strong tornado.						
EF1	NW of Akron	Greene	AL	32.9285°N 87.7809°W	02:38–02:40	1.17 mi (1.88 km)	270 yd (250 m)
EF1	Dozens of trees were snapped or uprooted, some of which damaged homes upon falling. Some homes also suffered significant roof damage.						
EF1	W of Vancleave	Jackson	MS	30.5204°N 88.8202°W	02:47–02:51	2.51 mi (4.04 km)	100 yd (91 m)
EF1	Multiple mobile homes had undercarriage and roof damage and were shifted off their foundations, but none of the anchor straps broke. There was additional minor roof damage to a well-built home and damage to a nearby barn, along with two uprooted trees.						
EF3	S of Brent to Montevallo	Perry, Bibb, Shelby	AL	32.7471°N 87.1201°W	02:53–03:24	29.24 mi (47.06 km)	1,200 yd (1,100 m)
EF3	The most intense damage from this large and strong tornado occurred in remote forested areas, where tens of thousands of large trees were snapped and uprooted along a wide swath, with some trunks left partially debarked. Camper units were rolled or destroyed at a hunting club, and several homes were damaged by tornadic winds and falling trees. The tornado weakened as it approached and struck the University of Montevallo campus, where trees were downed and dormitory building roofs were damaged before tornado dissipated. Two people were injured.						
EF1	NE of Holt	Tuscaloosa	AL	33.2447°N 87.4525°W	03:10–03:16	3.88 mi (6.24 km)	400 yd (370 m)
EF1	Numerous trees were snapped, a few of which fell on RVs.						
EF1	Faunsdale	Marengo	AL	32.4512°N 87.6053°W	03:25–03:27	1.03 mi (1.66 km)	180 yd (160 m)
EF1	This tornado caused considerable damage in the downtown part of Faunsdale. The roof and an exterior wall were removed from the Faunsdale Bar and Grill, tin panels were peeled back from the roof of a metal warehouse, and other structures sustained partial roof removal as well. A couple of outbuilding structures were destroyed, and several trees and tree limbs were downed.						
EF0	SW of Tanner Williams, AL	Jackson (MS), Mobile (AL)	MS, AL	30.6894°N 88.4184°W	03:30–03:34	1.88 mi (3.03 km)	50 yd (46 m)
EF0	Trees were damaged by this weak tornado.						
EF1	NW of Whatley	Clarke	AL	31.6641°N 87.7298°W	03:33–03:34	0.15 mi (0.24 km)	75 yd (69 m)
EF1	A large metal building structure lost most of its roof and some exterior metal walls, and many trees were snapped or uprooted. The tornado was associated with a broader swath of 90–95 mph (145–155 km/h) straight-line winds.						
EF0	E of Big Creek Lake	Mobile	AL	30.7528°N 88.3150°W	03:41–03:43	0.57 mi (0.92 km)	20 yd (18 m)
EF0	This brief tornado blew metal roofs off multiple sheds and snapped large trees.						
EF0	N of Mobile Regional Airport	Mobile	AL	30.7246°N 88.2514°W	03:43–03:44	0.71 mi (1.14 km)	30 yd (27 m)
EF0	This brief tornado snapped a couple of trees and did minor roof damage to a home.						
EF0	ENE of Safford	Dallas	AL	32.2915°N 87.3469°W	03:43–03:46	2.76 mi (4.44 km)	175 yd (160 m)
EF0	Trees were sporadically snapped or uprooted. A barn was destroyed, with its debris deposited several hundred yards downwind.						
EF1	Theodore to E of Tillmans Corner	Mobile	AL	30.557°N 88.1414°W	03:58–04:01	3.01 mi (4.84 km)	30 yd (27 m)
EF1	Several power poles were snapped, a carport was destroyed, a street sign was downed, and several homes and businesses sustained roof damage in Theodore. Several trees were snapped or uprooted as well.						
EF1	Camden	Wilcox	AL	32.002°N 87.302°W	04:09–04:11	0.77 mi (1.24 km)	170 yd (160 m)
EF1	Numerous trees were snapped and uprooted in and around town, and a small barn was damaged.						
EF0	Point Clear	Baldwin	AL	30.4668°N 87.9152°W	04:22–04:23	0.55 mi (0.89 km)	50 yd (46 m)
EF0	A few trees and tree limbs were downed in Point Clear.						
EF0	ENE of Rosinston	Baldwin	AL	30.6353°N 87.6288°W	04:50–04:53	1.34 mi (2.16 km)	30 yd (27 m)
EF0	The tops of trees were snapped by this small, weak tornado.						
EF1	S of Chelsea	Shelby	AL	33.2649°N 86.6431°W	04:58–05:06	4.52 mi (7.27 km)	135 yd (123 m)
EF1	Several outbuildings were destroyed, numerous homes suffered considerable roof damage, and numerous trees were snapped or uprooted by this high-end EF1 tornado. Several hundred feet of pasture fencing were destroyed at a power substation, and a barn lost a majority of its outer walls.						
EF0	Lowndesboro to SE of Autaugaville	Lowndes	AL	32.2663°N 86.6128°W	05:09–05:13	2.89 mi (4.65 km)	125 yd (114 m)
EF0	This tornado touched down in Lowndesboro, where a building at the Lowndes Academy lost its metal roof, numerous historic homes in town sustained minor roof damage, and one sustained more significant roof removal due to its front porch being uplifted. Dozens of trees were snapped or uprooted, and minor damage occurred outside of town before the tornado dissipated.						
EF0	E of Gonzalez	Escambia	FL	30.5751°N 87.261°W	05:25–05:26	0.32 mi (0.51 km)	50 yd (46 m)
EF0	Fencing, roofs, and siding sustained minor damage, and a couple of trees were snapped or uprooted.						
EF1	NNW of Pace	Santa Rosa	FL	30.6415°N 87.1849°W	05:32–05:34	0.39 mi (0.63 km)	50 yd (46 m)
EF1	Multiple homes had substantial portions of their roofing removed, and many trees were snapped or uprooted.						
EF1	Avalon	Santa Rosa	FL	30.52°N 87.1429°W	05:37–05:47	5.96 mi (9.59 km)	100 yd (91 m)
EF1	This tornado began over the Escambia Bay Bridge, overturning a semi-truck and injuring two occupants. It moved onshore from Escambia Bay into Avalon, causing widespread tree damage. A personal weather station recorded a peak gust of 97 mph (156 km/h), and multiple homes suffered roof and window damage. Street signs were downed, and some siding and roofing material was removed from the Avalon Utilities building as well.						

=== March 31 event ===
List of confirmed tornadoes – Thursday, March 31, 2022
EF#	Location	County / Parish	State	Start Coord.	Time (UTC)	Path length	Max width
EF3	E of Wausau to SSE of Cottondale	Washington, Jackson	FL	30.6376°N 85.5108°W	09:09–09:24	12.14 mi (19.54 km)	200 yd (180 m)
EF3	2 deaths – A strong tornado touched down near Wausau and passed to the northwest of Alford before dissipating, causing severe damage along its path. Multiple anchored single and double-wide mobile homes were thrown and obliterated, with debris scattered long distances through fields. Two people were killed in the destruction of a double-wide mobile home, and another person was injured after being thrown from a single-wide mobile home into a wooded area. The most intense damage was inflicted to a frame home that was completely swept away with only its block foundation remaining, and to a well-built brick home that had its roof torn off and exterior walls collapsed. Other residences were damaged to a lesser degree, while barns and outbuildings were destroyed and farming equipment was damaged. Numerous trees were snapped or uprooted along the path, projectiles were embedded into the ground, vehicles were moved and damaged, and a generator was ripped from its anchoring and thrown across a field. In addition to the two fatalities, three people were injured.						
EF2	Wayne Township	Armstrong	PA	40.8332°N 79.374°W	15:47–15:56	8.55 mi (13.76 km)	350 yd (320 m)
EF2	A strong multiple-vortex tornado snapped or uprooted hundreds of large hardwood trees in a wooded area. Two barns were destroyed, and metal roofing was ripped from a small outbuilding as well.						
EF2	SW of Norwood	Anson, Stanly	NC	35.1042°N 80.2373°W	17:22–17:31	7.24 mi (11.65 km)	200 yd (180 m)
EF2	A brick home was shifted off its foundation, with several of its exterior walls blown out and more than half of its roof removed. Tin roofing was ripped from an agricultural building, and a chicken farm was significantly damaged.						
EF1	SE of Nelson	Durham	NC	35.8672°N 78.8372°W	19:49–19:50	0.22 mi (0.35 km)	100 yd (91 m)
EF1	A brief, fast-moving tornado downed multiple trees, dislodged an HVAC unit from a warehouse roof, and damaged a fence.						
EF1	NNE of Turbotville to Lairdsville	Montour, Lycoming	PA	41.16°N 76.73°W	20:38–20:42	9.14 mi (14.71 km)	500 yd (460 m)
EF1	A tornado demolished three barns, one of which was thrown across a yard, with a piece of its lumber impaled into the hood of a Jeep. Wood from a second barn was thrown through a truck windshield, shattering the window and sending glass into the eye of a passenger. Multiple homes and outbuildings in Lairdsville suffered damage, a butcher shop was also damaged, and hundreds of trees were downed.						
EF0	Centreville	Fairfax	VA	38.8653°N 77.4579°W	00:22–00:23	0.05 mi (0.080 km)	30 yd (27 m)
EF0	About a dozen and a half trees were snapped or uprooted by this very brief and weak tornado.						
EF0	Tysons Corner	Fairfax	VA	38.9196°N 77.2259°W	00:41–00:42	0.13 mi (0.21 km)	50 yd (46 m)
EF0	Two gas stations sustained minor damage, and lightweight objects were thrown and lofted by this brief and weak tornado.						
EF1	NW of Dublin	Bucks	PA	40.3790°N 75.2266°W	01:48–01:52	2.01 mi (3.23 km)	100 yd (91 m)
EF1	A few homes and an apartment complex lost shingles and sustained minor exterior damage. A CVS pharmacy also sustained minor damage, and trees were uprooted or snapped, including one tree that fell on a parked vehicle.						

== See also ==
- Tornadoes of 2022
- List of United States tornadoes in December 2021
- List of United States tornadoes in April 2022
