= Big Branch =

Big Branch is the name for many rivers and streams. If can also refer to:

- Big Branch (Skull Lick Creek tributary), a stream in Missouri
- Big Branch (Haw River tributary), a stream in Alamance County, North Carolina
- Big Branch (Lanes Creek tributary), a stream in Anson County, North Carolina
- Big Branch (Crabtree Creek tributary), a stream in Wake County, North Carolina
- Big Branch Marsh National Wildlife Refuge
- Upper Big Branch Mine disaster
