= Brushy Fork =

Brushy Fork is the name of three streams in the United States:

- Brushy Fork (Tavern Creek tributary), Missouri
- Brushy Fork (Pauls Creek tributary), North Carolina
- Brushy Fork, West Virginia - see Brushy Fork Coal Impoundment
