= Watkins, Missouri =

Unincorporated community in Missouri, U.S.

Coordinates: 38°07′25″N 92°22′53″W

Watkins is an unincorporated community in Miller County, in the U.S. state of Missouri. The community lies on a ridge between Barren and Brushy Forks on Missouri Route KK, approximately five miles northwest of Iberia.

== History ==
A post office called Watkins was established in 1904, and remained in operation until 1949. The community has the name of William Shelton Watkins, a pioneer citizen.
