= Big Branch (Skull Lick Creek tributary) =

Stream in the American state of Missouri

Coordinates: 39.2136522°N 91.975173°W

Big Branch is a stream in Audrain County in the U.S. state of Missouri. It is a tributary of Skull Lick Creek.

Big Branch was named for its relatively big size.

== See also ==
- List of rivers of Missouri
