= Hawkeye, Missouri =

Unincorporated community in Missouri, U.S.

Coordinates: 38°00′20″N 92°23′35″W

Hawkeye is an unincorporated community in the northwest corner of Pulaski County, in the U.S. state of Missouri. The Pulaski-Camden county line is one-half mile to the west and the Pulaski-Miller county line is one mile to the north. Missouri Route U passes through the community. The community is on a ridge at an elevation of 1106 feet at the head of the north flowing Barren Fork, the northeast flowing Clinkingbeard Creek to the east and tributaries of west flowing Deane Creek to the south and west.

== History ==
A post office was in operation at Hawkeye from 1882 until 1955. The community was so named on account of its lofty elevation.
