= Big Branch, Louisiana =

Unincorporated community in Louisiana

- Unincorporated community
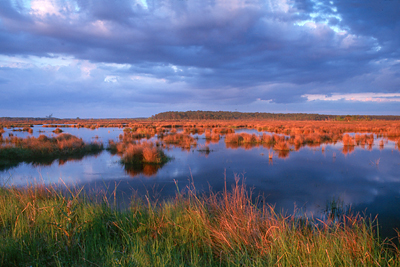
- Big Branch Marsh National Wildlife Refuge

- Location within Louisiana Location within the United States
- Coordinates: 30°20′02″N 89°59′34″W
- Country: United States
- State: Louisiana
- Parish: St. Tammany
- Elevation: 16 ft (4.9 m)
- Time zone: UTC-6 (Central (CST))
  - Summer (DST): UTC-5 (CDT)
- ZIP code: 70445
- Area code: 985
- GNIS feature ID: 560170
- FIPS code: 22-07255

Big Branch is an unincorporated community in St. Tammany Parish, Louisiana, United States. The community is located on U. S. Route 190 5 mi (8.0 km) southeast of Mandeville and 3.5 miles northwest of Lacombe.

The Big Branch Marsh National Wildlife Refuge lies along the coast of Lake Pontchartrain south of the community between Mandeville and Slidell.

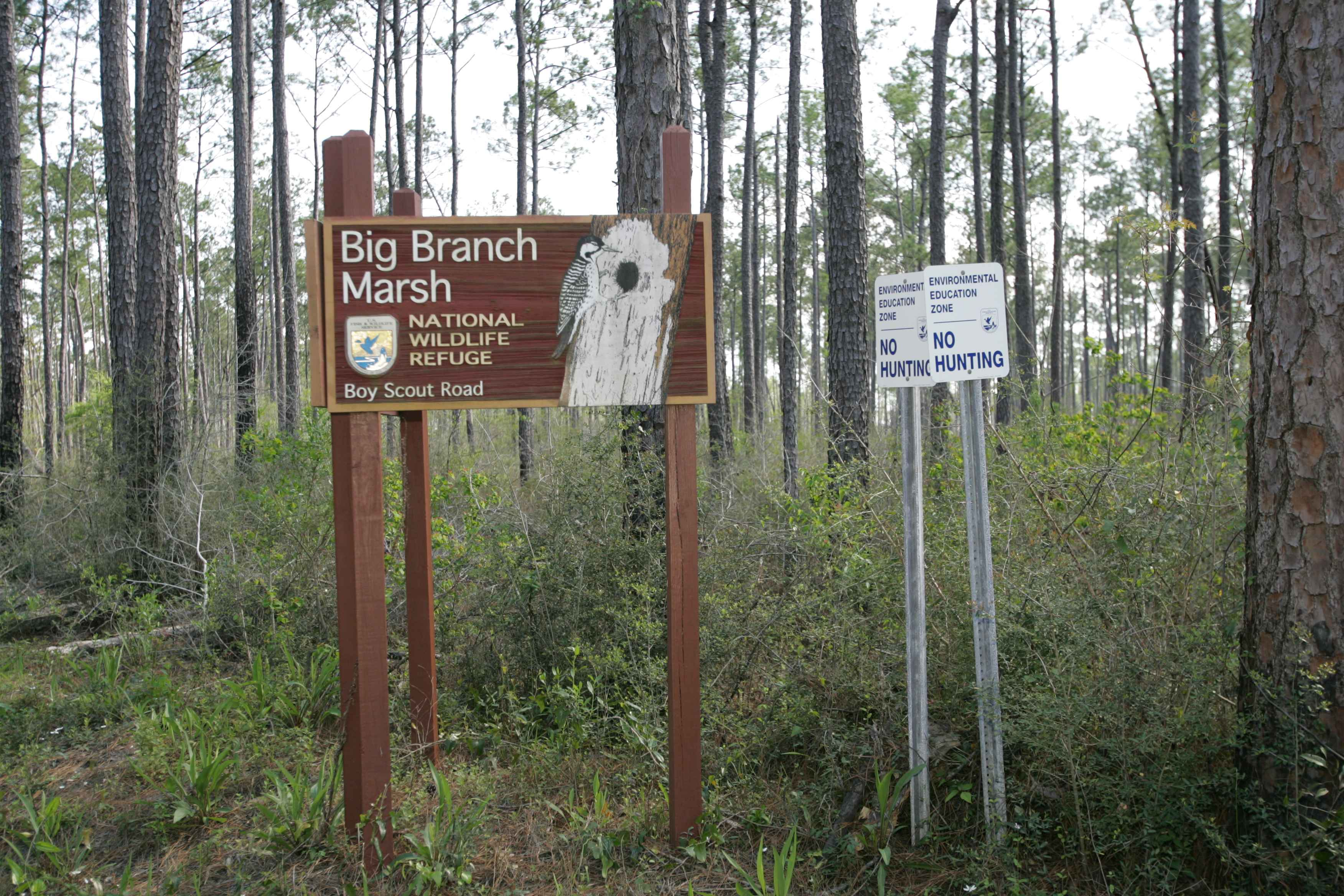
Entrance sign to the big branch marsh national wildlife refuge.
