= Barren Fork (Brushy Fork tributary) =

Stream in Missouri, U.S.

Barren Fork is a stream in Miller and Pulaski counties in the U.S. state of Missouri. It is a tributary of Brushy Fork.

The stream headwaters arise at 38°00′25″N 92°23′28″W in the northwest corner of Pulaski County approximately 3/4 mile north of the community of Hawkeye. The stream flows north into Miller County and passes under Missouri Route 42 midway between Brumley and Iberia and under Missouri Route 17 northwest of Iberia to its confluence with Brushy Fork at 38°09′45″N 92°20′03″W.

Barren Fork most likely was so named due to the lack of heavy timber along its course.

== See also ==
- List of rivers of Missouri
