= Scattering Fork =

Stream in the U.Sl state of Missouri

Scattering Fork is a stream in Audrain County in the U.S. state of Missouri. It is a tributary of the South Fork of the Salt River which it joins approximately four miles southeast of Mexico.

The headwaters arise in southwest Audrian County at 39°07′23″N 92°01′05″W at an elevation of approximately 890 feet. It flows initially northeast then turns to the east-southeast passing under US Route 54 four miles south of Mexico and on to its confluence with the South Fork at 39°06′29″N 91°51′43″W and an elevation of 751 feet.

Scattering Fork was so named on account of its irregular course.

== See also ==
- List of rivers of Missouri
