= Brushy Creek (Perkins County, South Dakota) =

Stream in South Dakota, U.S.

Coordinates: 45°09′13″N 102°38′11″W

Brushy Creek is a stream in the U.S. state of South Dakota.

Brushy Creek was named for the thick brush lining its course.

== See also ==
- List of rivers of South Dakota
