= Brushy Creek (Big Creek tributary) =

Stream in the American state of Missouri

Brushy Creek is a stream in northwest Henry County in the U.S. state of Missouri. It is a tributary of Big Creek.

The headwaters arise about two miles northeast of Creighton (at 38°31′18″N 94°02′07″W) and the stream flows to the east-northeast about three miles. The confluence with Big Creek is about 1.5 miles south of Blairstown (at 38°31′59″N 93°57′37″W).

Brushy Creek was so named on account of brush lining its course.

== See also ==
- List of rivers of Missouri
