= Fish Branch =

Stream in the American state of Missouri

Coordinates: 39.2447627°N 91.8935023°W

Fish Branch is a stream in Audrain County in the U.S. state of Missouri.

Fish Branch was so named for the creek's abundance of fish.

== See also ==
- List of rivers of Missouri
