= Brushy Creek (Saint Johns Creek tributary) =

Stream in the American state of Missouri

Brushy Creek (also called Brushy Fork) is a stream in Franklin County in the U.S. state of Missouri. It is a tributary of Saint Johns Creek. The stream headwaters are at 38°29′52″N 91°10′23″W and the confluence with Saint Johns Creek is at 38°31′16″N 91°06′55″W at an elevation of 512 feet (156 m).

Brushy Creek was so named on account of brush along its course.

== See also ==
- List of rivers of Missouri
