= Marfork, West Virginia =

- Unincorporated community
- Location within West Virginia Location within the United States
- Coordinates: 37°56′39″N 81°30′39″W
- Country: United States
- State: West Virginia
- County: Raleigh
- Elevation: 1,017 ft (310 m)
- Time zone: UTC-5 (Eastern (EST))
  - Summer (DST): UTC-4 (EDT)
- Area codes: 304 & 681
- GNIS feature ID: 1555045

Marfork is an unincorporated community in Raleigh County, West Virginia, United States. Marfork is 2.5 miles (4.0 km) southeast of Whitesville.
