= Brushy Creek (Gravois Creek tributary) =

Stream in the U.S. state of Missouri

Coordinates: 38°20′09″N 92°51′16″W

Brushy Creek is a stream in Morgan County in the U.S. state of Missouri. It is a tributary of Gravois Creek.

The stream headwaters arise at adjacent to Missouri Route 135 and north of the Proctor Towersite State Wildlife Area at an elevation of 1,050 ft (320 m). The stream flows northwest crossing under Missouri Route J to enter Gravois Creek at and an elevation of 673 ft (205 m). The confluence is adjacent to Missouri Route 5 approximately 2.5 miles northwest of the community of Gravois Mills.

Brushy Creek was so named due to the prevalence of brush along its streambanks.

== See also ==
- List of rivers of Missouri
