= Brushy Creek (Meade County, South Dakota) =

Stream in South Dakota, U.S.

Coordinates: 44°44′27″N 102°03′43″W

Brushy Creek is a stream in the U.S. state of South Dakota.

Brushy Creek was so named on account of the thick brush along its course.

== See also ==
- List of rivers of South Dakota
