= Brushy Mountains =

Brushy Mountain or Brushy Mountains may refer to:

- The source area of Hayfork Creek, Shasta County, California
- Brushy Mountain (Cobb County, Georgia), in the Atlanta metropolitan area
- The highest hill in Leverett, Massachusetts
- The highest peak in the Sierra Aguilada, Catron County, New Mexico
- Brushy Mountains (North Carolina)
- Brushy Mountain State Penitentiary, a former prison in Morgan County, Tennessee
- A mountain and trail in Tennessee; see Trillium Gap Trail
- Brushy Mountain (conservation area), a conservation area and mountain in Virginia

== See also ==
- Brushy Peak Regional Preserve, Alameda County, California
  - Brushy Peak
- Brush Mountain, a list of mountains
