= Brushy Creek (Black River tributary) =

Creek in Missouri

Coordinates: 36°58′12″N 90°35′43″W

Brushy Creek is a stream in Carter and Wayne counties in the U.S. state of Missouri. It is a tributary of the Black River.

Brushy Creek was so named on account of brush near its course.

== See also ==
- List of rivers of Missouri
