= Brushy Fork Coal Impoundment =

- Location within West Virginia
- Country: United States
- Location: Marfork, Raleigh County, West Virginia
- Coordinates: 37°54′59.48″N 81°28′59.95″W
- Purpose: Tailings storage
- Status: Operational, steadily enlarged
- Construction began: 1995
- Owner: Massey Energy

Dam and spillways
- Type of dam: Embankment
- Impounds: Brushy Fork
- Height: Current: 900 ft (270 m); Design: 954 ft (291 m)

Reservoir
- Total capacity: Current: 25,100 acre⋅ft (31,000,000 m^{3}); Design: 30,075 acre⋅ft (37,097,000 m^{3})

The Brushy Fork Coal Impoundment, also known as the Brushy Fork Coal Sludge Dam, is a large tailings dam on the Brushy Fork near Marfork in western Raleigh County of West Virginia, United States. It is located 18 mi (29 km) northwest of Beckley, the seat of Raleigh County. Brushy Fork flows into Little Marsh Fork, which then enters Marsh Fork, which is a tributary of the Coal River. The purpose of the dam is to store a sludge consisting of tailings and waste from a nearby coal mine. In 1995, Massey Energy received a permit to construct the dam. Over the years additional permits to increase the size and storage volume of the dam have been issued in the midst of local and regional opposition to its structural integrity. Currently at approximately 900 ft (270 m) in height, it is the tallest dam in the Western Hemisphere. When complete, its designed height will be 954 ft (291 m). Wasted rock from the coal mining process is used as the dam filler. The dam currently withholds about 25,100 acre⋅ft (31,000,000 m^{3}) of waste. This capacity will be increased to 30,075 acre⋅ft (37,097,000 m^{3}) upon completion.
