= Brushy Branch =

Stream in the American state of Missouri

Coordinates: 39.21905°N 91.92241°W

Brushy Branch is a stream in Audrain County in the U.S. state of Missouri. It is a tributary of Skull Lick Creek.

Brushy Branch was named for the brush along its course.

== See also ==
- List of rivers of Missouri
