= Big Branch Marsh National Wildlife Refuge =

American protected wildlife area

- IUCN category IV (habitat/species management area)
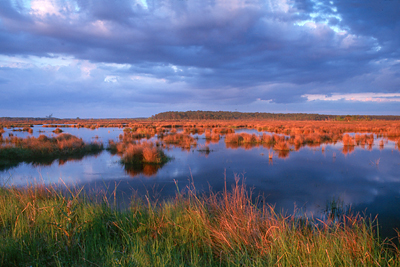

- Location within the United States
- Location: St. Tammany Parish, Louisiana
- Nearest city: Lacombe, Louisiana
- Coordinates: 30°17′00″N 89°58′00″W
- Area: 17,094 acres (6,918 ha)
- Established: 2001
- Visitors: 24,000 (in 2006)
- Governing body: U.S. Fish and Wildlife Service
- Website: Big Branch Marsh National Wildlife Refuge

Big Branch Marsh National Wildlife Refuge

Big Branch Marsh National Wildlife Refuge was formed in 1994. It is composed of 15,000 acres (6,100 ha) of pine flatwoods, oak rides and coastal marsh. This diverse habitat is an example of the natural coastline of Lake Pontchartrain surrounded by fast developing communities.

== Habitat ==
The refuge has unique habitat zones that contain diverse combinations of plant communities. These zones begin with the sandy beach fringing Lake Pontchartrain. Moving inland, the next zone is the brackish marsh. The third zone has a water level that is slightly below the marsh floor and the primary plants are wiregrass and spike rush. The furthest inland plant zone is the upland zone and it consists of pine flatwoods and bottomland hardwood hammocks.

== Wildlife ==
Endangered wildlife in the refuge are red-cockaded woodpecker, bald eagle and brown pelican. Other wildlife include rabbit, turkey, various neo-tropical birds, deer, squirrel, migratory waterfowl, and wading birds.

== Hurricane damage ==
The facilities at Big Branch Marsh NWR were damaged by Hurricane Katrina. The Boy Scout Road Trail boardwalk was destroyed, but a new and improved boardwalk was built in early 2007. Other facilities on the refuge have been repaired or rebuilt. Sections of marsh vegetation were damaged and thousands of trees were destroyed. Trees were replanted on the refuge in 2006, 2007, and 2008. A marsh restoration project occurred in 2008 in the Goose Point and Point Platte areas, and Christmas tree fences were placed in some sections of the marsh. Discarded Christmas trees placed in these fences slow wave action, trap sediments, and combat erosion.

== See also ==
- List of National Wildlife Refuges: Louisiana
