= Skull Lick Creek =

Stream in the American state of Missouri

Coordinates: 39°14′03″N 91°53′17″W

Skull Lick Creek is a stream in Audrain County in the U.S. state of Missouri. It is a tributary to the South Fork of the Salt River.

Skull Lick Creek most likely was named for an incident when a party of settlers were killed by Indians who left their skulls behind.

== See also ==
- List of rivers of Missouri
