= Brushy Fork (Tavern Creek tributary) =

Stream in the U.S. state of Missouri

Coordinates: 38°10′03″N 92°19′37″W

Brushy Fork is a stream in Miller County in the U.S. state of Missouri. It is a tributary of Tavern Creek.

The stream headwaters arise just north of Missouri Route 42 about two miles northeast of Brumley at and an elevation of about 950 feet. The stream flows to the northeast passing between the communities of Ulman and Watkins and under Missouri Route 17 to its confluence with Tavern Creek at .

Brushy Fork was so named due to the abundance of brush along its course.

== See also ==
- List of rivers of Missouri
