= April 2022 North American storm complex =

2022 American storm complex

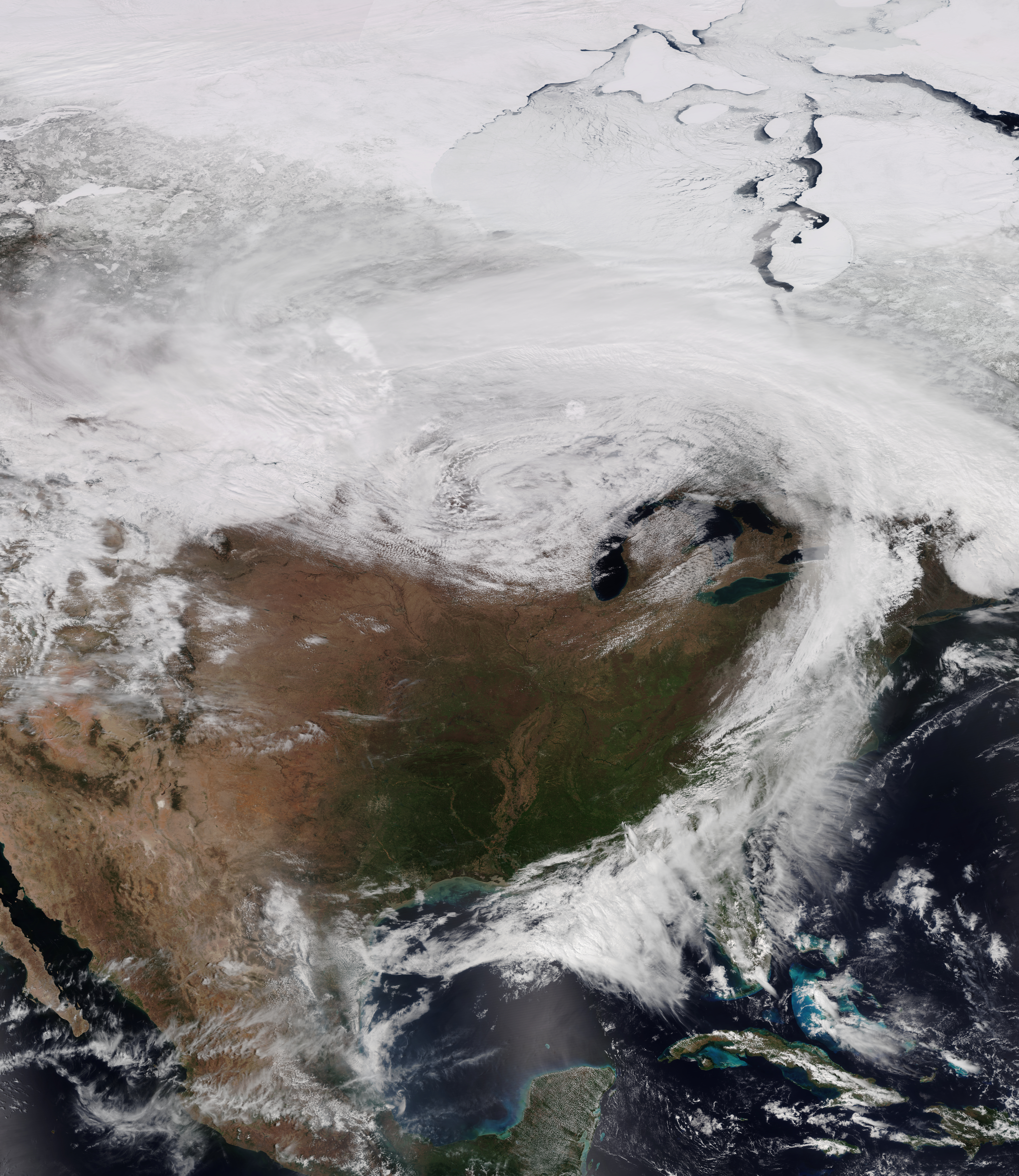
- Satellite image of the large storm system over the Upper Midwest on April 14

Meteorological history
- Formed: April 10, 2022
- Dissipated: April 16, 2022

Winter storm
- Lowest pressure: 983 hPa (mbar); 29.03 inHg
- Lowest temp: −15 °F (−26 °C) in West Yellowstone, Montana on April 13
- Max. snowfall: 47 in (120 cm) near Pony, Montana

Tornado outbreak
- Tornadoes: 74
- Max. rating: EF3 tornado
- Highest winds: 165 mph (266 km/h)
- Largest hail: 5.5 in (14 cm)

Overall effects
- Fatalities: 2 non-tornadic
- Injuries: 28
- Damage: $2.2 billion (2022 USD)
- Areas affected: Northwestern, Midwestern, and Southern United States
- Power outages: >374,000
- Part of the 2021–22 North American winter and tornado outbreaks of 2022

The April 2022 North American storm complex affected much of the Rocky Mountains and the Midwestern United States with tornadoes, heavy snow, and gusty winds. The system in general first began impacting the Northwest on April 11, before moving eastward into the Rocky Mountains the following day. It was also responsible for producing a large severe weather outbreak of tornadoes and damaging straight-line wind in the Midwest and South while contributing to a powerful blizzard in the upper Midwest states of North and South Dakota.

In the upper Midwest, the system brought record-breaking snowfall and blizzard conditions to North and South Dakota and adjunct states, producing up to 3–4 feet (36–48 in) of snowfall and knocking power out to thousands and killing at least one person. The warm side of the system also knocked power out to thousands in the South and produced 74 tornadoes, with the strongest being rated EF3, and very large hail as well. One non-tornadic death was attributed to the severe weather in the South, while another non-tornadic death occurred in North Dakota when a blizzard hit the area.

== Meteorological synopsis ==
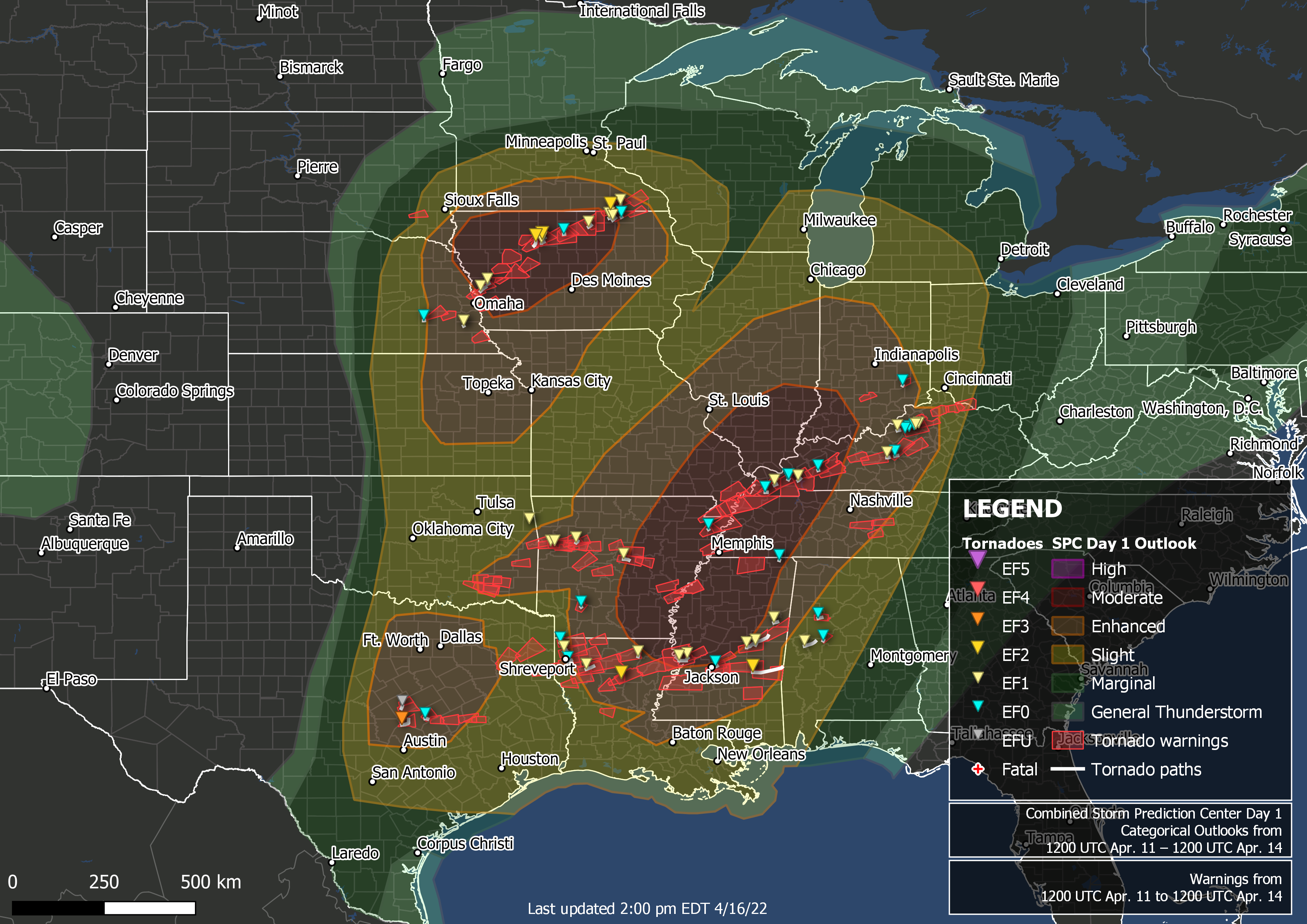
Tornado warnings and confirmed tornadoes from April 11–14, 2022.

Signs for a severe weather outbreak, the fourth one in four weeks, became evident the day before, on April 10. The Storm Prediction Center, on their Day 2 Convective Outlook, introduced a large slight risk area, covering northeastern Texas, southeastern Oklahoma, much of Arkansas, southern portions of Missouri, and extreme western Kentucky and Tennessee. A cold front positioned itself along much of Arkansas and eastern Oklahoma, on an area with elevated moisture, leading to the rise of moderate dew points, around 65 °F (18 °C). This, combined with the expected daytime heating to occur over much of the Ark-La-Tex region, created an environment favorable for supercell initiation. Given this, the outlook introduced a large 5% contour for tornadoes. The following day, the risk was increased to an enhanced level, with this new area of higher probabilites for severe weather being placed along north-central Arkansas and extreme eastern Oklahoma. Given the presence of strong wind shear and CAPE values reaching 2500 J/kg in this area, a 10%, unhatched corridor for tornadoes was introduced, as the environment was poised to be more favorable for supercells to develop. As the afternoon advanced, even greater confidence grew that this corridor was even more favorable for sustained supercells, and a 10%, hatched risk for tornadoes, indicating the possibilities for strong tornadoes to occur, was issued along the same corridor in Arkansas and eastern Oklahoma. Multiple supercell thunderstorms developed by the early evening, soon becoming tornadic. A couple of intense supercells produced a few tornadoes over west-central Arkansas. This included a large supercell that developed near Mayflower, Arkansas, producing a tornado that prompted the issuance of a tornado emergency. However, the tornado ended up only causing EF1 tree damage. Several other EF1 tornadoes touched down in the area that afternoon and evening as well, one of which caused considerable damage to trees, mobile homes, and outbuildings near Scranton.

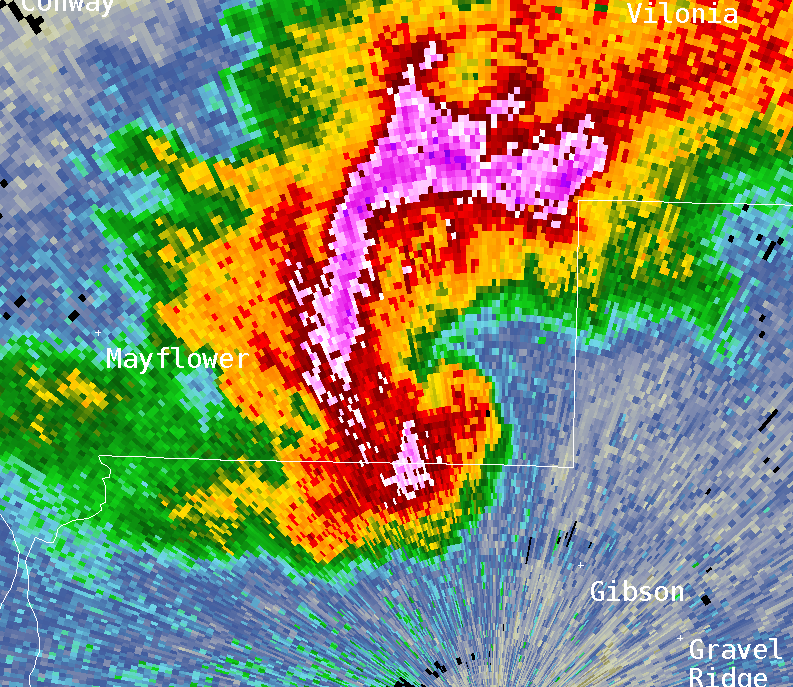
Tornadic storm in southeast Faulkner County, Arkansas, at 8:10 p.m. CDT on April 11, as it produced an EF1 tornado. This tornado prompted a tornado emergency.

On the morning of April 12, the Storm Prediction Center issued a moderate risk for Iowa, including a 15% hatched risk for tornadoes. A highly sheared and unstable airmass was in place over Iowa, with CAPE values exceeding 2000 J/kg, ample low-level moisture, and significant low-level shear and helicity present. With supercell development being likely, strong tornadoes were expected. Farther south, an enhanced risk was in place over eastern Texas, with a 5% risk of tornadoes outlined for that area, along with much of Louisiana and Arkansas. Later that day, a large and strong EF2 tornado caused major damage to homes near Gilmore City, Iowa, and destroyed multiple barns and farm implements, injuring one person. Another EF2 tornado caused significant damage to a few structures near Rutland, while an EF1 tornado moved through the outskirts of Mason City, damaging some buildings there as well. In the southern threat area, a large high-end EF3 tornado destroyed multiple homes and two churches near the town of Salado, Texas, injuring 23 people. Farther north, a damaging EF2 tornado struck the town of Taopi, Minnesota, where homes had roofs and exterior walls torn off, many trees were downed, cars were flipped, and two people were injured. On April 13, the Storm Prediction Center issued another moderate risk, this time for eastern Arkansas, northern Mississippi, western Tennessee, the Missouri Bootheel, and Western Kentucky, including a 15% hatched risk area for tornadoes and a 45% hatched risk area for damaging winds. Another highly moist, unstable, and sheared environment was in place, and numerous additional tornadoes touched down across the threat area, though due to a predominantly linear storm mode, only a couple of strong tornadoes occurred, although there was widespread significant wind damage. The most significant tornado of the day impacted the rural community of Clarkdale, Mississippi, causing EF2 damage to trees and structures. Another EF2 tornado caused major tree damage near Sikes, Louisiana. Father north, several weak EF0 and EF1 tornadoes caused minor to moderate damage near the towns of Monette, Arkansas; Leachville, Arkansas; Mayfield, Kentucky; and Briensburg, Kentucky, all of which sustained severe to catastrophic damage on December 10, 2021.

== Confirmed tornadoes ==
Confirmed tornadoes by Enhanced Fujita rating
EFU	EF0	EF1	EF2	EF3	EF4	EF5	Total
3	27	38	5	1	0	0	74

=== April 11 event ===
List of confirmed tornadoes – Monday, April 11, 2022 (Note: All dates are based on the local time zone where the tornado touched down; however, all times are in Coordinated Universal Time for consistency.)
EF#	Location	County / Parish	State	Start Coord.	Time (UTC)	Path length	Max width
EF1	SSE of Bloomer	Sebastian	AR	35.276°N 94.134°W	22:12–22:13	1 mi (1.6 km)	140 yd (130 m)
EF1	Trees were uprooted, and large tree limbs were snapped in a heavily wooded area of Fort Chaffee.						
EF1	SE of Charleston	Franklin	AR	35.280°N 94.038°W	22:23–22:32	2.4 mi (3.9 km)	200 yd (180 m)
EF1	A home and several outbuildings were damaged, and several trees were snapped or uprooted.						
EF1	NE of Scranton	Logan	AR	35.36°N 93.51°W	23:33–23:44	3.38 mi (5.44 km)	100 yd (91 m)
EF1	A metal barn sustained significant damage, the roof of a mobile home was damaged, a small outbuilding was destroyed, and many trees were snapped or uprooted.						
EFU	N of Talihina	LeFlore	OK	34.816°N 95.011°W	00:11–00:13	0.75 mi (1.21 km)	100 yd (91 m)
EFU	A brief tornado touched down over a rural area, causing no damage.						
EF1	E of Mayflower to NNE of Gibson	Faulkner, Pulaski	AR	34.9551°N 92.3488°W	01:07–01:18	7.85 mi (12.63 km)	100 yd (91 m)
EF1	Many trees were downed at Camp Robinson and just north of the Cato community.						

=== April 12 event ===
List of confirmed tornadoes – Tuesday, April 12, 2022
EF#	Location	County / Parish	State	Start Coord.	Time (UTC)	Path length	Max width
EFU	Fort Hood	Coryell	TX	31.3405°N 97.7778°W	22:06–22:15	3.89 mi (6.26 km)	50 yd (46 m)
EFU	Weather spotters confirmed a tornado over an inaccessible part of Fort Hood; the damage path was unable to be surveyed.						
EF3	N of Florence to NW of Salado	Williamson, Bell	TX	30.8846°N 97.788°W	22:29–23:06	16.55 mi (26.63 km)	770 yd (700 m)
EF3	See section on this tornado – 23 people were injured.						
EF2	NE of Palmer to W of Gilmore City	Pocahontas	IA	42.6492°N 94.5437°W	23:15–23:33	7.17 mi (11.54 km)	450 yd (410 m)
EF2	A large and strong tornado damaged farmsteads, destroyed outbuildings, and snapped power poles along its path.						
EF1	E of Gilmore City to SSW of Rutland	Humboldt	IA	42.7158°N 94.3539°W	23:28–23:37	3.34 mi (5.38 km)	300 yd (270 m)
EF1	This tornado produced high-end EF1 damage to several farms along an unusual fish-hook shaped path. Trees were damaged as well.						
EF1	NE of Monroe	Ouachita	LA	32.5619°N 91.9872°W	23:34–23:39	2.55 mi (4.10 km)	300 yd (270 m)
EF1	Numerous trees were damaged, including about 100 that were uprooted or snapped. Many of these trees landed on buildings and caused structural damage; one landed on a manufactured home and injured the occupant.						
EF2	NW of Rutland to SSE of Bode	Humboldt	IA	42.7912°N 94.3335°W	23:39–23:50	4.85 mi (7.81 km)	250 yd (230 m)
EF2	A strong tornado snapped numerous power poles and caused considerable damage to farmsteads. The tornado moved along an unusual fish-hook shaped path, much like the previous EF1 tornado that occurred near Rutland.						
EFU	SW of Goehner	Seward	NE	40.80°N 97.24°W	23:43	0.5 mi (0.80 km)	10 yd (9.1 m)
EFU	Video evidence as well as train spotter reports confirmed a brief, weak tornado over open terrain south of Interstate 80. The total path length is uncertain due to the lack of damage.						
EF0	SSE of Seaton	Bell	TX	31.0408°N 97.217°W	00:25–00:31	3.73 mi (6.00 km)	120 yd (110 m)
EF0	A weak tornado that was observed by storm spotters downed several trees.						
EF0	Kanawha	Hancock	IA	42.9334°N 93.8167°W	00:33–00:36	1.65 mi (2.66 km)	100 yd (91 m)
EF0	A brief, weak tornado caused minor damage in Kanawha.						
EF1	SE of Missouri Valley to ESE of Logan	Harrison	IA	41.5351°N 95.8569°W	01:08–01:18	9.55 mi (15.37 km)	140 yd (130 m)
EF1	A tornado embedded within a larger area of damaging straight-line winds damaged trees, destroyed a few barns and sheds, and inflicted minor damage to a home.						
EF1	Unadilla	Otoe	NE	40.6818°N 96.2706°W	01:24–01:25	0.09 mi (0.14 km)	40 yd (37 m)
EF1	A brief tornado caused damage to the roofs, siding, and gutters of three homes in town. Tree damage occurred as well.						
EF1	ESE of Woodbine	Harrison	IA	41.71°N 95.69°W	01:25–01:28	2.30 mi (3.70 km)	200 yd (180 m)
EF1	Trees were damaged, a shed was destroyed, and other farm structures were damaged.						
EF1	W of Benton	Caddo, Bossier	LA	32.6792°N 93.8091°W	02:54–02:57	4.31 mi (6.94 km)	200 yd (180 m)
EF1	A center pivot irrigation system was flipped, five metal farm or outbuildings had their roofs partially removed, and numerous trees were snapped or uprooted by this high-end EF1 tornado. A guest house was shifted off its foundation and destroyed. A nearby two-story single family home had a large portion of its roof removed, and a second home was also damaged.						
EF0	Southern Shreveport to WSW of Haughton	Caddo, Bossier	LA	32.4197°N 93.7138°W	02:55–03:04	12 mi (19 km)	400 yd (370 m)
EF0	A weak tornado embedded within a larger area of damaging straight-line winds impacted the Louisiana State University Shreveport campus, downing trees and damaging the school's baseball and soccer fields. Elsewhere along the path, many trees were downed, including three that fell on and severely damaged mobile homes. Power poles and power lines were downed, a food stand was damaged, and several homes suffered minor shingle damage. The tornado crossed Barksdale Air Force Base, where more trees were downed and tree branches were broken, before dissipating.						
EF0	N of Hosston	Caddo	LA	32.8992°N 93.8991°W	02:57–02:58	1.23 mi (1.98 km)	50 yd (46 m)
EF0	A weak tornado snapped tree limbs.						
EF1	W of Castor to NW of Lucky	Bienville	LA	32.2493°N 93.2595°W	03:23–03:34	11.46 mi (18.44 km)	525 yd (480 m)
EF1	Numerous trees were snapped or uprooted along the path.						
EF1	Southeastern Mason City	Cerro Gordo	IA	43.1113°N 93.2045°W	03:26–03:32	4.49 mi (7.23 km)	100 yd (91 m)
EF1	A tornado moved through the southeastern outskirts of Mason City, where several buildings damaged, including some that had their roofs blown off. An office building was heavily damaged as well.						
EF1	S of Grafton	Worth	IA	43.2796°N 93.0667°W	03:34-03:36	1.19 mi (1.92 km)	70 yd (64 m)
EF1	A tornado caused damage to trees and an outbuilding at a farmstead.						
EF0	S of Prescott	Nevada	AR	33.7813°N 93.3883°W	03:41–03:42	0.22 mi (0.35 km)	50 yd (46 m)
EF0	A number of trees were uprooted by this brief, weak tornado.						
EF0	NW of Rudd	Floyd, Mitchell	IA	43.1572°N 92.9427°W	03:41–03:48	8.14 mi (13.10 km)	50 yd (46 m)
EF0	Satellite imagery revealed a tornado path through open farm fields.						
EF2	Taopi	Mower	MN	43.5406°N 92.6601°W	03:46–03:52	3.93 mi (6.32 km)	475 yd (434 m)
EF2	A significant tornado caused severe damage as it passed directly through the small town of Taopi. Multiple homes sustained major structural damage, with roofs removed and walls collapsed, including one home that had multiple exterior walls knocked down. Outbuildings and barns were heavily damaged or destroyed, power poles were snapped, and many trees were downed. Cars were flipped, and debris was scattered throughout the town and deposited in trees. Two people were injured.						
EF1	S of Brownville	Mitchell	IA	43.3244°N 92.7049°W	03:57–04:00	2.8 mi (4.5 km)	250 yd (230 m)
EF1	A tornado damaged trees and outbuildings.						
EF1	E of New Haven to ESE of Riceville	Mitchell, Howard	IA	43.2574°N 92.6427°W	03:57–04:09	9.09 mi (14.63 km)	325 yd (297 m)
EF1	Numerous farm buildings and grain bins were damaged.						
EF1	SW of Spring Valley	Fillmore	MN	43.651°N 92.4214°W	04:08–04:11	2.3 mi (3.7 km)	180 yd (160 m)
EF1	Farm buildings and trees were damaged.						
EF0	S of Saratoga	Howard	IA	43.3276°N 92.4483°W	04:10–04:16	4.5 mi (7.2 km)	125 yd (114 m)
EF0	Trees were damaged by this weak tornado.						
EF0	Northwestern Ridgeway	Winneshiek	IA	43.2965°N 92.0033°W	04:36–04:37	0.6 mi (0.97 km)	125 yd (114 m)
EF0	A weak tornado briefly touched town in the northwestern part of Ridgeway, where homes and a few other buildings sustained minor roof and window damage. Sheet metal debris was scattered and deposited in trees.						
EF0	W of Fremont	Winona	MN	43.8998°N 91.9822°W	04:40–04:44	3.14 mi (5.05 km)	70 yd (64 m)
EF0	Radar and satellite imagery indicated a tornado over open fields.						
EF0	Fremont	Winona	MN	43.9088°N 91.897°W	04:41–04:42	1.8 mi (2.9 km)	20 yd (18 m)
EF0	Minor tree damage occurred in the Fremont area as a result of this small, weak tornado.						

=== April 13 event ===
List of confirmed tornadoes – Wednesday, April 13, 2022
EF#	Location	County / Parish	State	Start Coord.	Time (UTC)	Path length	Max width
EF1	Stilwell	Adair	OK	35.820°N 94.659°W	13:50–13:59	6.5 mi (10.5 km)	700 yd (640 m)
EF1	Numerous trees were snapped or uprooted, power poles were snapped, and a truck was blown over. Many apartment buildings, homes, and businesses were damaged in town. One person was injured.						
EF1	WNW of Monette	Craighead	AR	35.8938°N 90.5171°W	19:36–19:42	5.36 mi (8.63 km)	200 yd (180 m)
EF1	Several trees and wooden high-tension power poles were downed. Several houses sustained roof damage as well.						
EF0	NE of Leachville, AR to Hornersville, MO	Mississippi (AR), Dunklin (MO)	AR, MO	35.9719°N 90.2253°W	19:50–19:58	7.8 mi (12.6 km)	100 yd (91 m)
EF0	A manufactured home, an outbuilding, several center pivot irrigation systems, and trees were damaged. Additional irrigation systems were rolled.						
EF0	West Ridge to S of Etowah	Mississippi	AR	35.6823°N 90.2637°W	20:00–20:02	1.88 mi (3.03 km)	75 yd (69 m)
EF0	A brief tornado struck an abandoned school building in West Ridge, blowing a large section of the roof into a nearby field.						
EF0	NW of Water Valley	Hickman	KY	36.60°N 88.87°W	21:06–21:09	2.66 mi (4.28 km)	50 yd (46 m)
EF0	Trees were downed, and outbuildings were damaged.						
EF1	WSW of Redwood	Warren, Issaquena	MS	32.4644°N 90.9808°W	21:14–21:32	9.81 mi (15.79 km)	1,320 yd (1,210 m)
EF1	The tornado moved over rural areas from Warren County, across southern Issaquena County, and back into Warren County. Many trees were snapped or uprooted.						
EF1	NNE of Mayfield	Graves	KY	36.77°N 88.64°W	21:23–21:27	3.06 mi (4.92 km)	100 yd (91 m)
EF1	Metal barns sustained roof damage, a carport was flipped, billboards were damaged or destroyed, and wooden power poles were pushed over.						
EF1	NNE of Redwood	Warren	MS	32.5159°N 90.7829°W	21:37–21:39	1.25 mi (2.01 km)	200 yd (180 m)
EF1	Numerous trees were snapped or uprooted.						
EF0	NE of Briensburg (1st tornado)	Marshall	KY	36.91°N 88.31°W	21:50–21:51	0.88 mi (1.42 km)	25 yd (23 m)
EF0	A house sustained roof damage, an outbuilding lost its roof, and trees were downed.						
EF1	Land Between the Lakes National Recreation Area	Trigg, Lyon	KY	36.88°N 88.06°W	21:51–21:56	4.78 mi (7.69 km)	150 yd (140 m)
EF1	Several trees were downed in the Land Between the Lakes National Recreation Area. The tornado dissipated after crossing Lake Barkley.						
EF0	NE of Briensburg (2nd tornado)	Marshall	KY	36.91°N 88.29°W	21:53–21:54	0.69 mi (1.11 km)	25 yd (23 m)
EF0	This tornado occurred just east of the previous Briensburg area tornado. A house sustained siding damage, and a porch roof was lifted. A chicken coop was destroyed, a barn sustained roof damage, and trees were downed as well.						
EF2	SE of Sikes to W of Columbia	Winn, Caldwell	LA	32.0117°N 92.4006°W	22:11–22:28	18.74 mi (30.16 km)	625 yd (572 m)
EF2	A strong tornado moved through forested areas, snapping and uprooting countless large trees.						
EF0	SW of Crofton	Christian	KY	37.0107°N 87.5425°W	22:22-22:23	0.14 mi (0.23 km)	30 yd (27 m)
EF0	A witness reported a brief tornado touchdown in a field.						
EF0	S of St. Charles	Hopkins	KY	37.13°N 87.57°W	22:34–22:35	0.88 mi (1.42 km)	25 yd (23 m)
EF0	Several small trees were snapped by this brief, weak tornado.						
EF0	E of Flowood	Rankin	MS	32.3152°N 90.0910°W	23:19–23:24	2.82 mi (4.54 km)	25 yd (23 m)
EF0	A weak tornado downed a couple of trees and snapped small tree limbs. It moved across runways at the Jackson–Medgar Wiley Evers International Airport, with the funnel cloud being seen from the NWS Jackson office at the airport.						
EF0	Corinth	Alcorn	MS	34.9251°N 88.5227°W	23:45–23:46	0.18 mi (0.29 km)	25 yd (23 m)
EF0	A very brief tornado embedded in a larger area of straight-line wind damage caused roof damage to two frail warehouse buildings in Corinth, with one also losing several walls. A metal power pole was damaged as well.						
EF1	ESE of Upton	Larue	KY	37.45°N 85.874°W	00:13–00:16	2.6 mi (4.2 km)	200 yd (180 m)
EF1	A small barn was completely destroyed and others were damaged. A few homes sustained minor fascia and shingle damage, and trees were snapped or uprooted. The tornado occurred within a larger area of straight-line wind damage.						
EF1	Fairmount	Jefferson	KY	38.114°N 85.613°W	00:23–00:30	7.2 mi (11.6 km)	175 yd (160 m)
EF1	This tornado caused considerable damage in the Louisville neighborhood of Fairmount. Numerous homes and apartment buildings sustained extensive roof and siding damage, including one house that had its roof blown off. Many trees were downed, a parked truck was moved from a driveway, and outbuildings were damaged.						
EF0	SE of Buffalo	Larue	KY	37.486°N 85.68°W	00:23–00:27	3.8 mi (6.1 km)	200 yd (180 m)
EF0	A farm outbuilding sustained damage to its metal roof, and the lean-to attachment to the structure was destroyed. A few other outbuildings, homes, greenhouses, and an orchard structure sustained damage as well. A carport was demolished, and trees were snapped or uprooted.						
EF0	W of Millhousen	Decatur	IN	39.2185°N 85.4947°W	00:27–00:28	0.11 mi (0.18 km)	25 yd (23 m)
EF0	The roof and wall of an outbuilding were damaged, with sheet metal roofing and wood tossed between 200–400 yards (180–370 m) to the north. A 2x4 was driven into the ground, and a small horse trailer was picked up and thrown.						
EF0	W of Taylorsville	Spencer	KY	38.0477°N 85.4331°W	00:30	0.07 mi (0.11 km)	30 yd (27 m)
EF0	A brief, small tornado caused roof damage to a couple homes and scattered insulation into trees. A large satellite dish was thrown 20 yards (18 m) and wedged between two trees as well.						
EF0	NNE of Taylorsville	Spencer	KY	38.087°N 85.333°W	00:35	0.12 mi (0.19 km)	60 yd (55 m)
EF0	Several homes sustained damage to shingles, flashing, siding, and gutters. A chicken coop was destroyed, and several trees were downed.						
EF1	Northern Richland	Rankin	MS	32.2239°N 90.1810°W	00:35–00:41	4.86 mi (7.82 km)	250 yd (230 m)
EF1	Multiple trees and a couple power lines were downed on the north side of Richland.						
EF0	S of Shelbyville	Shelby	KY	38.128°N 85.208°W	00:44	0.1 mi (0.16 km)	50 yd (46 m)
EF0	A brief, small tornado caused shingle damage to a home, picked up a dog house, removed roofing and siding from a large barn, and removed the roof of a 10-by-15-foot (3.0 m × 4.6 m) metal outbuilding. Several trees were downed as well.						
EF1	SE of Shelbyville	Shelby	KY	38.147°N 85.171°W	00:45–00:46	0.21 mi (0.34 km)	100 yd (91 m)
EF1	A brief tornado caused significant roof and siding damage to three barns, with wood impaled into the ground and insulation and metal blown into trees. A few trees were twisted or snapped as well.						
EF1	ESE of Shelbyville	Shelby	KY	38.165°N 85.126°W	00:48–00:53	3.52 mi (5.66 km)	125 yd (114 m)
EF1	A second tornado occurred in the Peytona area of Shelby County, touching down shortly after the previous tornado. The metal siding of a barn and sections of its roof were thrown up to 300 yards (270 m) away, a 10-by-15-foot (3.0 m × 4.6 m) storage building was picked up, destroyed, and scattered around 300 yards (270 m) as well. A large oak tree was uprooted and landed on a house, numerous other trees were snapped or twisted, several more barns sustained significant roof and siding damage, and several wooden telephone poles were snapped as well.						
EF0	NE of Shelbyville	Shelby	KY	38.2805°N 85.1097°W	00:54–00:56	1.5 mi (2.4 km)	60 yd (55 m)
EF0	Many trees were twisted or uprooted. A barn sustained minor damage to its roof panels.						
EF1	SSE of Pelahatchie to SSE of Morton	Rankin, Scott	MS	32.2878°N 89.7920°W	00:57–01:07	9.7 mi (15.6 km)	670 yd (610 m)
EF1	Trees were snapped and uprooted, tin roofing was ripped off a small farm building, and power lines were downed.						
EF1	Edinburg to NNW of Philadelphia	Leake, Neshoba	MS	32.7922°N 89.3297°W	01:05–01:12	10.53 mi (16.95 km)	400 yd (370 m)
EF1	Numerous trees were downed, including one that fell onto a shed and vehicle. Some outbuildings were also damaged.						
EF1	N of Philadelphia to WSW of Macon	Neshoba, Winston, Noxubee	MS	32.8454°N 89.1077°W	01:21–01:42	24.67 mi (39.70 km)	400 yd (370 m)
EF1	Many trees and several power poles and power lines were downed along the path, with several trees falling on homes, vehicles, and outbuildings. Near Vernon in Winston County, an awning at a convenience store was destroyed and part of the gas station canopy was damaged.						
EF1	SE of Forest	Scott	MS	32.3226°N 89.4313°W	01:18–01:20	2.32 mi (3.73 km)	200 yd (180 m)
EF1	Trees were downed along the path.						
EF1	E of Lake	Newton	MS	32.3287°N 89.2543°W	01:29–01:32	2.59 mi (4.17 km)	250 yd (230 m)
EF1	Trees were snapped or uprooted.						
EF2	NE of Montrose to E of Whynot	Jasper, Clarke, Lauderdale	MS	32.1753°N 89.1721°W	01:36–02:19	43.08 mi (69.33 km)	1,800 yd (1,600 m)
EF2	This very large, long-tracked QLCS tornado damaged or downed hundreds of trees, snapped power poles, damaged homes and mobile homes, and heavily damaged or destroyed barns and outbuildings. The most intense damage occurred south of Meridian, in the Clarkdale area along the Clarke–Lauderdale county line. In this area, many large trees were snapped and twisted, and multiple homes had large sections of their roofs torn off. A school in Clarkdale lost a large part of its roof, and its baseball field and batting cage were heavily damaged. Some metal buildings were destroyed at the baseball field as well, and part of a sign was blown off a gas station, while a nearby business suffered minor damage to its metal siding. Mainly tree damage occurred elsewhere along the path. This was the second tornado to strike Clarkdale in 2022; an EF1 tornado struck the area on March 30, 2022.						
EF1	NE of Seminary to SSW of Laurel	Jones	MS	31.6392°N 89.3953°W	01:44–02:01	14.58 mi (23.46 km)	500 yd (460 m)
EF1	A couple of sheds were destroyed, and a few manufactured homes sustained minor roof damage. Otherwise, mainly trees were damaged.						
EF1	WSW of Crawford (1st tornado)	Winston, Noxubee, Oktibbeha	MS	33.2636°N 88.8424°W	01:51–01:59	6 mi (9.7 km)	700 yd (640 m)
EF1	This tornado moved through the Noxubee National Wildlife Refuge, just north of the following tornado. Many trees were downed along the path.						
EF1	WSW of Crawford (2nd tornado)	Winston, Noxubee, Oktibbeha	MS	33.2324°N 88.8657°W	01:51–02:05	10.63 mi (17.11 km)	150 yd (140 m)
EF1	This tornado moved through the Noxubee National Wildlife Refuge, just south of the previous tornado. Many trees were downed along the path.						
EF1	S of Sessums to ESE of Artesia	Oktibbeha, Lowndes	MS	33.3793°N 88.7226°W	02:03–02:15	9.27 mi (14.92 km)	450 yd (410 m)
EF1	Several small outbuildings and sheds were thrown or damaged, a utility pole was damaged, and numerous trees were downed.						
EF1	ENE of Brooksville	Noxubee, Lowndes	MS	33.2246°N 88.4875°W	02:11–02:19	7.49 mi (12.05 km)	1,000 yd (910 m)
EF1	The damage was primarily in Noxubee County, where a house lost some shingles, two barns sustained partial roof loss and wall collapse, and a third barn was buckled and partially collapsed. Six center-pivot irrigation systems were overturned, and many trees were downed. In Lowndes County, more trees were downed, and a home sustained roof and decking damage.						
EF1	Eutaw to S of Moundville	Greene, Hale	AL	32.8184°N 87.9020°W	02:35–02:56	17.61 mi (28.34 km)	400 yd (370 m)
EF1	A tornado embedded within a larger area of damaging straight-line winds caused damage to at least 40 homes in the Branch Heights neighborhood of Eutaw. A couple homes lost much of their roofs, along with a business and an administrative building. It crossed into Hale County, moving through Akron and causing minor roof damage to an apartment building before dissipating just north of Havana. Numerous trees were downed along the path. No tornado warning was ever issued for the tornado.						
EF0	ESE of Moundville	Hale	AL	32.9510°N 87.4442°W	03:11–03:12	0.65 mi (1.05 km)	50 yd (46 m)
EF0	Several trees were snapped or uprooted in the Talladega National Forest. This tornado occurred just a few hundred yards west of an EF2 tornado on February 3.						
EF0	NNW of Windham Springs	Tuscaloosa	AL	33.5018°N 87.5660°W	03:30–03:38	5.23 mi (8.42 km)	300 yd (270 m)
EF0	Several trees were uprooted, tree limbs were broken off, and a manufactured home sustained skirting, siding, and shingle damage.						

=== Bell County–Salado, Texas ===
Bell County–Salado, Texas
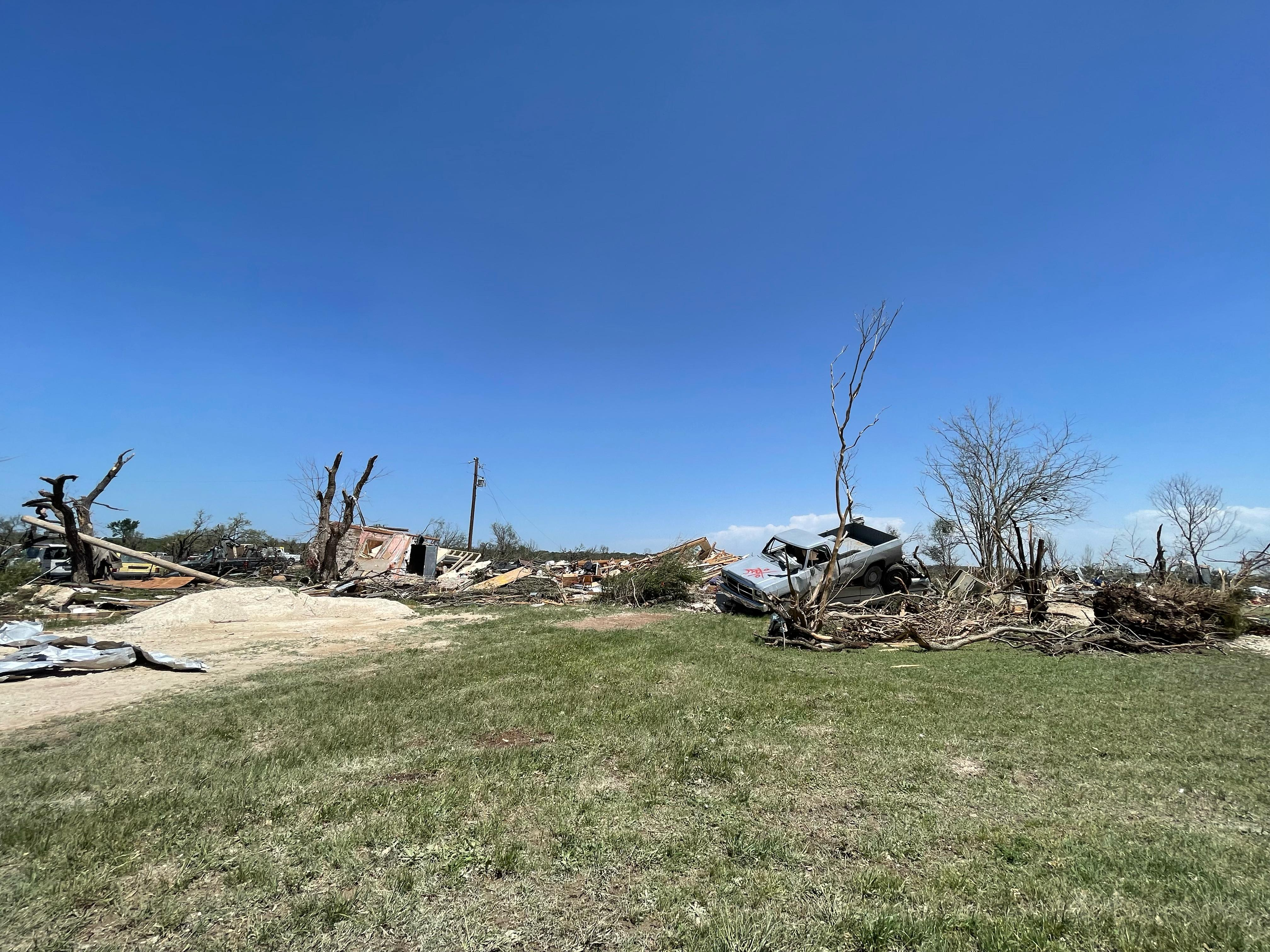
- A home that was mostly flattened at high-end EF3 intensity near Salado, with debarked trees and tossed vehicles nearby.

Meteorological history
- Formed: April 12, 2022, 5:29 p.m. CDT (UTC−05:00)
- Dissipated: April 12, 2022, 6:06 p.m. CDT (UTC−05:00)
- Duration: 37 minutes

EF3 tornado
- on the Enhanced Fujita scale
- Highest winds: 165 mph (266 km/h)

Overall effects
- Injuries: 23+
- Damage: >$100,000 (2022 USD)

This large, intense tornado first touched down north of Florence in Williamson County, Texas, just east of SH 195 and moved east-northeastward, initially only causing weak EF0 damage. As the tornado crossed Ramms Drive, it intensified to EF1 strength, damaging a manufactured home and causing significant tree damage, with several large mature oak trees being uprooted. It weakened back to EF0 strength as it crossed County Road 228 and moved over rural terrain towards the Williamson–Bell County line. It briefly reintensified to EF1 strength as it moved east-southeast before crossing the county line at County Road 231. A mobile home was shifted off its foundation and multiple large oak trees were snapped and uprooted. It weakened slightly as it entered Bell County, damaging an outbuilding and producing tree damage as it turned back to the east-northeast, approaching FM 2843 with the damage in this area being rated from EF0 to EF1. Evidence shows that the parent circulation produced at least three small, brief tornadoes as it moved into Bell County that moved along short paths before the larger tornado formed. Due to all of them occurring from the same circulation and because each were on the ground within a short amount of time of each other, they were considered as part of the same tornado that originally touched down and the damage path reached its peak width in this area as a result.

As it began to move along FM 2843, the tornado rapidly intensified to EF2 strength as it passed near a stone quarry, severely damaging a frame home, destroying a manufactured home, and inflicting lesser damage to another manufactured home. As the tornado passed through the intersection of FM 2843 and Cedar Valley Road, it reached high-end EF3 intensity and continued to follow FM 2843 to the east-northeast. Around 10 to 15 homes were severely damaged or destroyed in this area, with the most severe damage occurring along Buttermilk Lane, where a few well-built homes were mostly leveled, with only portions of a few walls left standing. Trees in this area were snapped, denuded, and debarked, and multiple power poles were snapped. Vehicles were thrown, impaled with projectiles, or piled on top of each other, and two churches in this area were also destroyed, one of which was mostly leveled and swept away. After moving away from FM 2843 west of Salado, the tornado weakened back to EF2 intensity, causing significant tree damage and destroying some outbuildings. Just before it reached Mustang Creek Road, it abruptly made a sharp almost 90-degree turn and began moving due-north, weakening to EF1 strength and producing a broad swath of tree damage, including several trees that were uprooted. Some homes and barns also sustained EF1 damage along this portion of the path. The tornado continued at EF1 intensity as it then crossed Crows Ranch Road, tearing metal panels off the roof of a home and blowing in a panel garage door. It then crossed over a ridge and briefly intensified back to high-end EF2 strength as it moved over FM 2484. A home suffered significant roof and exterior wall loss at this location, a large barn was shifted off its foundation, a shed had its roof panels lifted up, and many trees were uprooted. The tornado then weakened back to EF1 intensity as it continued due-north, causing minor to moderate damage in the South Shore subdivision and Union Grove Park before lifting as it moved over Stillhouse Hollow Lake. Twenty-three people were injured, and a pregnant woman lost her unborn baby as a result of injuries sustained during the tornado. The tornado was rated a high-end EF3, with an estimated peak wind speed of 165 mph (266 km/h). It reached a peak width of 770 yd (700 m) |- class="expand-child" | colspan="8" style=" border-bottom: 1px solid black;|

|, and was on the ground for 16.66 mi (26.81 km).

== Non-tornadic effects ==
=== Severe storms ===
Very large hail fell in central and eastern Texas on the afternoon of April 12. The storm that dropped the EF3 tornado near Salado produced one hailstone that was 5.5 inches (14 cm) in diameter. An area of strong straight-line winds also impacted Downtown Shreveport, Louisiana, downing many trees and power lines. Later that night in Louisiana, a large swath of damaging straight-line winds of up to 93 miles per hour (150 km/h) moved northeastward from northwest of Corinth through Bernice. Many trees were damaged with some snapped or uprooted and a building in Bernice lost part of its roof covering. Wind damage covered a massive area in Mississippi and the Ohio Valleys on April 13. Wind gusts in Peoria, Illinois reached 55 miles per hour (89 km/h) on April 14. In Rison, Arkansas, several trees were blown down, including one that fell on a mobile home, resulting in a fatality.

=== Winter weather side ===
==== Freezing temperatures ====
A daily record low temperature in Denver, Colorado was set due to this storm, at 11 °F (−12 °C), on April 13. Several locations in Montana also had record low conditions across April 12 and 13. West Yellowstone got as low as −15 °F (−26 °C), setting a record cold minimum. The maximum of 22 °F (−6 °C) also broke a record. Record cold maximums were more common. In Elko, Nevada, a record low daily temperature of 7 °F (−14 °C) was set. For the first time in history, Seattle recorded two consecutive April days with highs below 45 °F (7 °C). April 2022 was the 3rd coldest on record in Washington and 5th coldest on record in Montana, while being the coldest in 16 cities including Walla Walla, Miles City and Kalispell.

==== Blizzard ====
Billings, Montana recorded their snowiest April day since 1955, and broke their record for the snowiest April 12 on record, with over 10 inches (25 cm) of snowfall as of 11:30 AM. Pony, Montana saw 47 inches (120 cm) of snow. The blizzard caused Interstate 94 to be shut down between Jamestown, North Dakota and Glendive, Montana, US Route 83 to be closed from Bismarck, North Dakota to Minot, North Dakota, and US Route 85 to be closed from the South Dakota border to Amidon, North Dakota. The snow significantly contributed to the snowiest April on record in Bismarck, North Dakota. In Elko, Nevada, a daily maximum amount of 0.8 inches (2.0 cm) was set. The blizzard caused one fatality in North Dakota. In addition Portland, Oregon saw its first April accumulating snow on record, causing 55,000 customers to lose power. The snowstorm caused multiple car crashes along Interstate 82, and forced portions of U.S. Route 26 in Portland to close.

== Impact ==
Forecasted blizzard conditions caused Amtrak to suspend its Empire Builder service between Spokane, Washington and St. Paul, Minnesota between April 11–13 and between April 16–18. The southbound Texas Eagle was severely delayed early on April 13 due to severe storms downing trees on the right-of-way south of Arkadelphia, Arkansas. Later that day, severe weather warnings and downed trees also delayed the northbound City of New Orleans. The westbound Cardinal incurred the most delays. It first struck a tree before coming into Maysville, Kentucky early on April 14 and then was delayed several more times due to more down trees along its path. Upon running over 8 hours late, the train was terminated at Indianapolis with alternate transportation provided along the rest of the route to Chicago.

On April 11, the Major League Baseball announced that the game between the Saint Louis Cardinals and Pittsburgh Pirates was postponed and rescheduled for June 14. On April 12, the National Hockey League announced that the upcoming Winnipeg Jets game against the Seattle Kraken, which was originally scheduled for April 13, has been postponed to May 1 as a winter storm sweeps through the southern area of Manitoba. On April 13, a video is released of cattle in Douglas huddling together in the storm to protect their calves.

== See also ==
- List of North American tornadoes and tornado outbreaks
- List of United States tornadoes in April 2022
- Tornado outbreak and blizzard of April 13–15, 2018
- Weather of 2022
