= March 2022 tornado outbreak =

March 2022 tornado outbreak can refer to:

- Tornado outbreak of March 5–7, 2022
- Tornado outbreak of March 21–23, 2022
- Tornado outbreak of March 29–31, 2022
