= Lodi Township =

Lodi Township may refer to:

- Lodi Township, Washtenaw County, Michigan
- Lodi Township, Mower County, Minnesota
- Lodi Township, Bergen County, New Jersey
- Lodi Township, Athens County, Ohio
- Lodi Township, Spink County, South Dakota, in Spink County, South Dakota
