= Tornado outbreak of March 29–31, 2022 =

Late March tornado outbreak

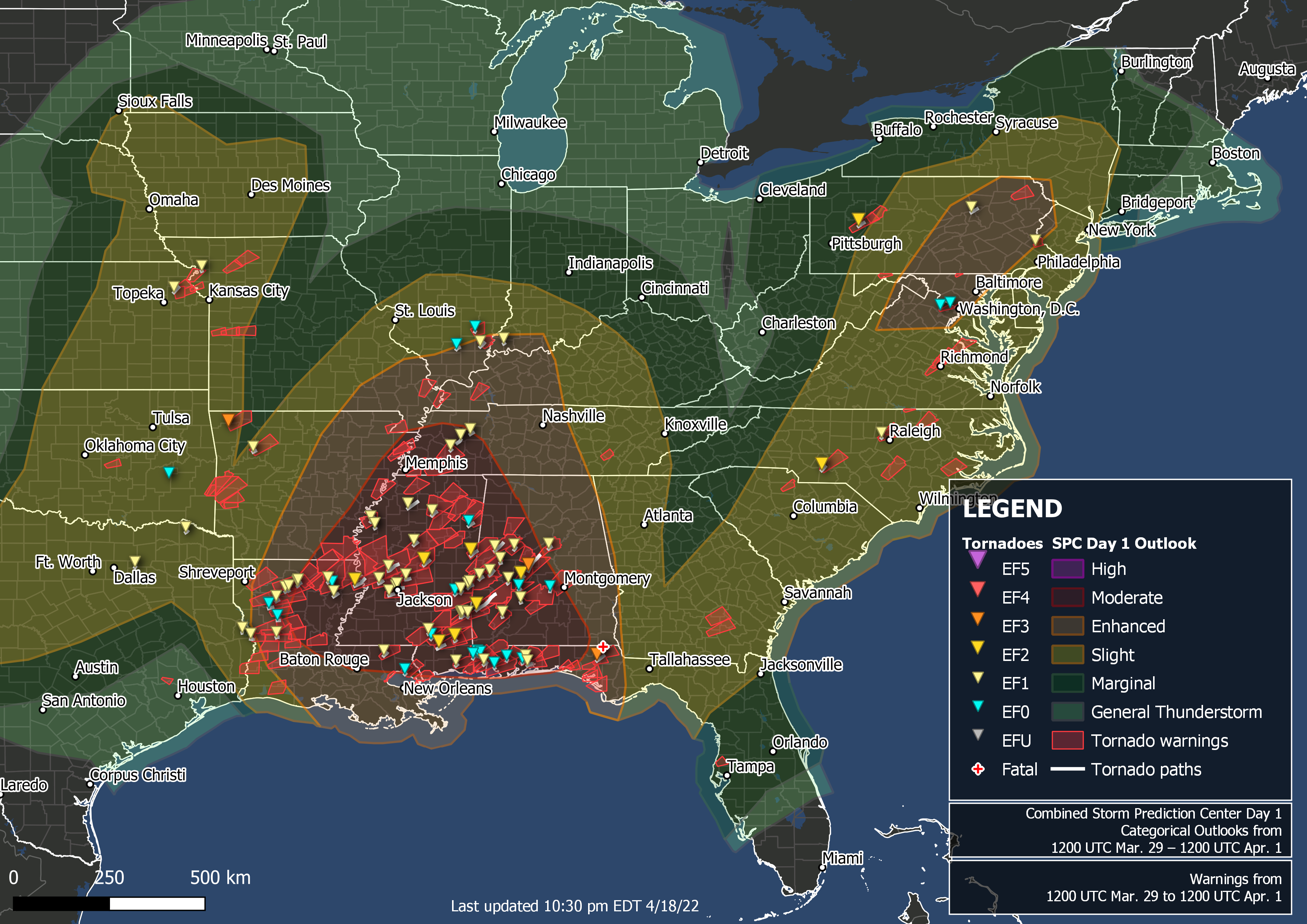
- Confirmed tornadoes and tornado warnings from March 29–31

Meteorological history
- Duration: March 29–31, 2022

Tornado outbreak
- Tornadoes: 90
- Max. rating: EF3 tornado
- Highest winds: Tornadic – 150 mph (240 km/h) (Alford, Florida EF3 on March 31); Non-tornadic – 83 mph (134 km/h) (Oak Grove, West Carroll Parish, Louisiana straight-line winds on March 30)
- Largest hail: 1.75 in (4.4 cm) in Pace, Florida, on March 31

Overall effects
- Fatalities: 2 (Note: The National Centers for Environmental Information documented 3 tornadic fatalities in this tornado outbreak, however, the National Weather Service of State College confirmed a fatality marked in Lairdsville, Pennsylvania is a mistake.)
- Injuries: 17
- Damage: $1.3 billion (2022 USD)
- Areas affected: Southern United States, Midwestern United States, Eastern United States
- Power outages: >240,000
- Part of the tornado outbreaks of 2022

Between March 29–31, 2022, a line of strong to severe thunderstorms and multiple supercells swept through portions of the United States and brought widespread wind damage and several strong tornadoes across a large part of the Midwestern, Southern, and Eastern United States. An EF3 tornado was confirmed in Springdale, Arkansas, while an EF1 tornado passed close to downtown Jackson, Mississippi. Numerous tornadoes, some of which were strong occurred over Mississippi, Alabama the evening of March 30 and into the early morning of March 31. Multiple tornadoes also occurred in the Florida Panhandle, including an intense EF3 tornado that killed two people and injured three others near Alford, Florida, and in other states such as North Carolina and Pennsylvania. Producing a total of 90 tornadoes, this was the largest tornado outbreak of 2022.

== Meteorological synopsis ==
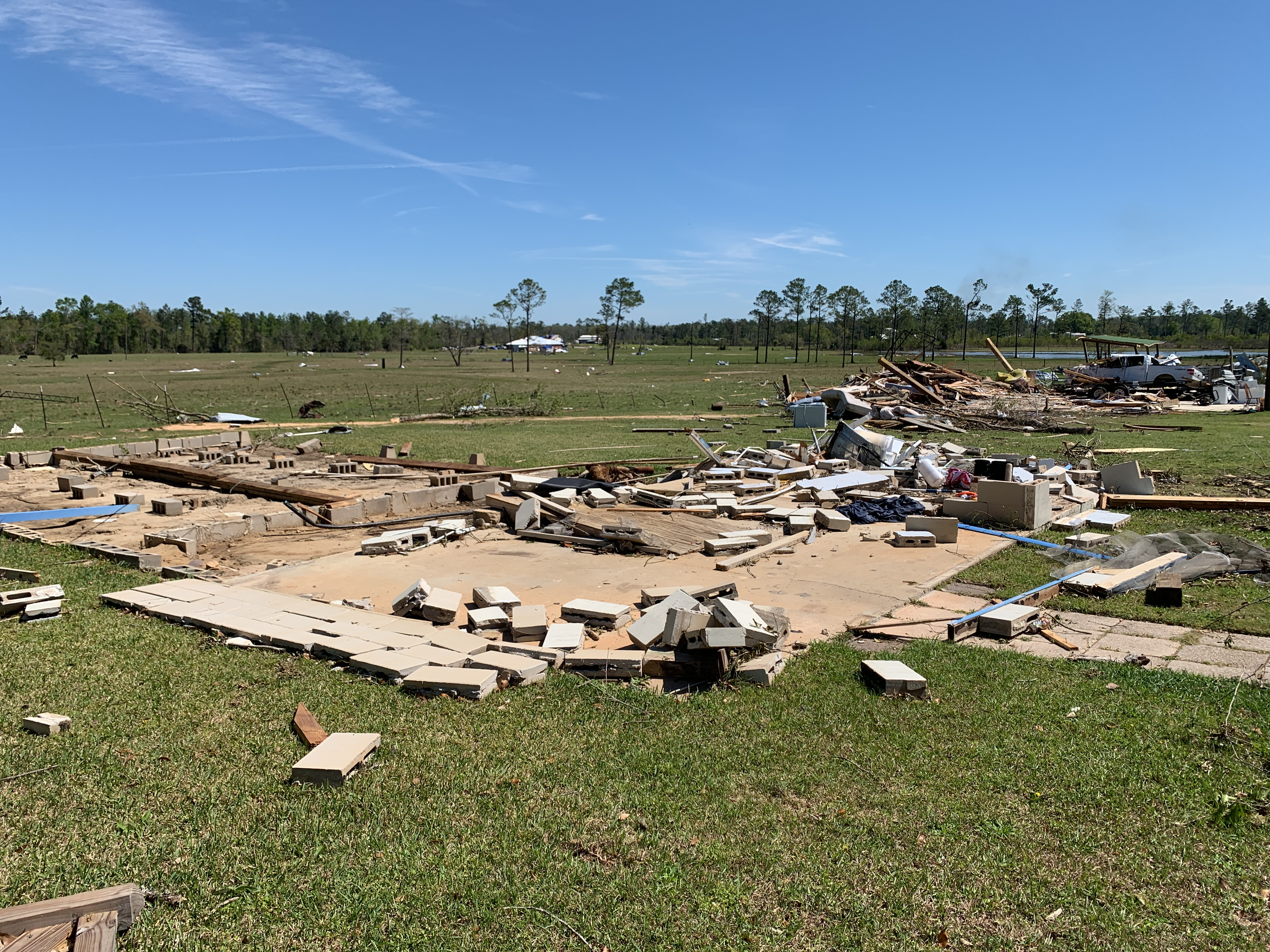
A block foundation home that was completely swept away and destroyed at EF3 intensity west of Alford, Florida.

On March 25, the Storm Prediction Center (SPC) issued an outlook highlighting the potential for organized severe weather across portions of the Southern Plains and Southeast United States beginning on March 29. This region had already been affected by a significant tornado outbreak just days prior. Subsequent forecasts increased the risk level across portions of the Southeast, in addition to encompassing sections of the Mid-Atlantic into March 31. While March 29 translated to a level 2/Slight risk of severe weather stretching from Iowa southward to Texas, a broader and more significant threat area began to materialize across the Southeast valid for the following day. The SPC outlined an expansive level 4/Moderate risk of severe weather stretching from Louisiana and Arkansas eastward through Alabama. In this region, forecasters noted the potential for an extensive squall line capable of producing hurricane-force damaging winds and numerous tornadoes, some of which could be significant/EF2 or greater. These predictions were further expanded to include portions of Tennessee and Florida.

Synoptically, forecasters highlighted a broad upper-level trough over the Western United States as the impetus for a potential severe weather outbreak. A potent and negatively-tilted shortwave was expected to round the base of this larger trough, providing substantial upper-level divergence for thunderstorm development across a broad region. This feature was anticipated to significantly increase mid- and low-level wind shear as it progressed from Texas northeastward into Kentucky on March 30. At the surface, a quickly deepening area of low pressure was forecast to move across Missouri and Illinois, providing significant advection of moist air into its open warm sector. Widespread convection initiated along the dry line across the Southern Plains on March 29, congealing into an organized squall line as the potent upper-level system continued to translate eastward. By the pre-dawn hours of March 30, observations across the Arklatex and Ozarks showed modest CAPE and very strong wind shear, a combination that suggested some potential for supercells capable of producing large hail, wind damage, and isolated tornadoes.

Shortly after 09:00 UTC, a tornado developed in Washington County, Arkansas, causing EF3 damage to an elementary school and a large warehouse building in Springdale. It resulted in seven injuries. Into the afternoon hours, with continued moisture advection and surface heating contributing to additional instability, a well-organized squall line began to intensify as it moved across Arkansas, Louisiana, Mississippi, and eventually into Alabama. Across central and coastal sections of these states, environmental conditions became more conducive for the squall line to devolve into a series of semi-discrete supercell thunderstorms, with a heightened risk of tornadoes. As the night progressed, multiple strong supercells embedded within the larger storm system developed across Mississippi, Alabama, and the Florida Panhandle. Entering a highly favorable environment for maturing, the storms began producing tornadoes, some of which were long-tracked, causing severe damage. A long-tracked, intense tornado occurred in central Alabama, passing through Perry and Bibb counties. By the early morning hours of, the severe weather shifted to the Florida Panhandle, where an intense supercell developed near Pensacola. This supercell would produce multiple tornadoes along its track, the first one of which prompted a PDS tornado warning near the towns of Harold and Holt, in Santa Rosa County. Later on, another supercell developed further east, becoming tornadic over Washington County, and another PDS tornado warning was issued for Alford. Two people were killed and three others were injured by a strong EF3 tornado that destroyed multiple homes and mobile homes near the town. Later that day, scattered tornadoes touched down across areas of the Eastern United States as far north as Pennsylvania before the outbreak came to an end.

== Confirmed tornadoes ==
Confirmed tornadoes by Enhanced Fujita rating
EFU	EF0	EF1	EF2	EF3	EF4	EF5	Total
0	21	57	9	3	0	0	90

=== March 29 event ===
List of confirmed tornadoes – Tuesday, March 29, 2022 (Note: All dates are based on the local time zone where the tornado touched down; however, all times are in Coordinated Universal Time for consistency.)
EF#	Location	County / Parish	State	Start Coord.	Time (UTC)	Path length	Max width
EF1	SSE of Valley Falls to S of Nortonville	Jefferson	KS	39.28°N 95.43°W	00:56–01:06	9.86 mi (15.87 km)	10 yd (9.1 m)
EF1	A tornado embedded within a larger area of damaging straight-line winds damaged outbuildings and farm equipment. One outbuilding was destroyed at the end of path.						
EF1	Eastern St. Joseph	Buchanan	MO	39.7806°N 94.7842°W	01:54–01:55	0.3 mi (0.48 km)	40 yd (37 m)
EF1	A brief tornado touched down in the eastern part of St. Joseph. A school building had part of its roof torn off, a house sustained significant structural damage, and a few trees and tree limbs were downed at a local park.						

=== March 30 event ===
List of confirmed tornadoes – Wednesday, March 30, 2022
EF#	Location	County / Parish	State	Start Coord.	Time (UTC)	Path length	Max width
EF3	Northern Fayetteville to Springdale	Washington	AR	36.122°N 94.156°W	09:04–09:12	5.2 mi (8.4 km)	350 yd (320 m)
EF3	This strong tornado developed just southwest of the Northwest Arkansas Mall in the northern part of Fayetteville, near Johnson. An automotive business was destroyed, while other businesses and a few homes sustained minor to moderate damage as the tornado passed near the mall. A van was rolled and a cell tower was blown over before the tornado entered Springdale, where vehicles were flipped and dozens of homes were damaged, some significantly with partial to total roof loss. The most intense damage occurred at George Elementary School, which had part of its roof peeled back and sustained total collapse of its metal gymnasium building, and at a large Nilfisk distribution warehouse that was largely flattened, with both areas earning a low-end EF3 rating. A hangar at Springdale Municipal Airport was destroyed, and other buildings were damaged on the east side of the airport. A couple of businesses were heavily damaged, and additional homes sustained minor roof damage before the tornado dissipated. Many trees and power poles were snapped along the path, and debris from Springdale was blown northward into Benton County. Seven people were injured.						
EF1	McLendon-Chisholm	Rockwall	TX	32.834°N 96.3474°W	09:34–09:36	0.49 mi (0.79 km)	50 yd (46 m)
EF1	A brief tornado embedded within a larger area of straight-line winds caused significant damage to the top floor of a house, moved several trailers, and destroyed a shed. Another home sustained collapse of its porte-cochère, and the attached garage had its roof torn off. Poles were bent at a basketball court, and a few trees were downed.						
EF0	Adamson	Pittsburg	OK	34.922°N 95.551°W	09:39–09:40	0.6 mi (0.97 km)	100 yd (91 m)
EF0	Several houses, outbuildings, and a manufactured home sustained minor damage in Adamson. Trees were snapped or uprooted, and multiple trailers were rolled.						
EF1	NW of Clarksville	Red River	TX	33.6486°N 95.1559°W	11:25–11:29	3.03 mi (4.88 km)	100 yd (91 m)
EF1	Metal panels were ripped off a barn and thrown up to 300 yd (270 m) away. The roof of another barn and a home were damaged, and trees were downed along the path.						
EF1	Harmony	Johnson	AR	35.5362°N 93.5756°W	12:47–12:53	3.46 mi (5.57 km)	400 yd (370 m)
EF1	Many trees and tree limbs were damaged or snapped in and around town, and there was also some light roof damage to some structures.						
EF1	SE of Hemphill	Sabine	TX	31.2925°N 93.8314°W	16:16–16:17	0.95 mi (1.53 km)	100 yd (91 m)
EF1	One outbuilding was destroyed and several others were damaged. Trees were also uprooted. Lack of road access prevented additional surveying.						
EF1	WSW of Toledo Bend Dam	Newton	TX	31.1491°N 93.6336°W	16:41–16:45	1.92 mi (3.09 km)	100 yd (91 m)
EF1	Ten homes were damaged near Toledo Bend Reservoir, several of which sustained significant roof damage. A couple more homes were damaged by falling trees, while garages and boat houses were severely damaged as well.						
EF0	Powhatan	Natchitoches	LA	31.8748°N 93.2103°W	16:53–16:54	1.21 mi (1.95 km)	100 yd (91 m)
EF0	About 15 to 20 tree branches were downed in and around Powhatan, and panels were ripped from three chicken houses.						
EF0	S of Powhatan to Campti	Natchitoches	LA	31.8656°N 93.2078°W	16:53–16:59	5.49 mi (8.84 km)	100 yd (91 m)
EF0	Many tree branches were downed along the path.						
EF1	W of Goldonna	Natchitoches	LA	32.0323°N 93.0364°W	17:05–17:08	3.67 mi (5.91 km)	200 yd (180 m)
EF1	Trees were snapped or uprooted, and the roofs of a house and barn were damaged.						
EF1	W of Hodge	Bienville	LA	32.2535°N 92.822°W	17:20–17:22	1.74 mi (2.80 km)	400 yd (370 m)
EF1	Numerous trees were snapped or uprooted.						
EF0	S of Melrose	Natchitoches	LA	31.584°N 93.0073°W	17:22–17:24	2.67 mi (4.30 km)	50 yd (46 m)
EF0	A couple of tree limbs were downed by this weak tornado.						
EF1	NW of Hodge	Jackson	LA	32.2813°N 92.7414°W	17:28–17:29	0.29 mi (0.47 km)	200 yd (180 m)
EF1	This brief tornado heavily damaged the side of an outbuilding and snapped or uprooted many trees. The tornado may have continued into an inaccessible area.						
EF1	S of Simpson	Vernon	LA	31.1854°N 93.0299°W	17:37–17:41	2.08 mi (3.35 km)	85 yd (78 m)
EF1	The roof of a manufactured home and several trees were damaged. A metal building had its roof torn off as well.						
EF1	W of Eros	Jackson	LA	32.3883°N 92.5378°W	17:42–17:43	0.67 mi (1.08 km)	500 yd (460 m)
EF1	Many trees were snapped or uprooted by this brief tornado.						
EF1	NW of Eros	Jackson	LA	32.4227°N 92.5223°W	17:44–17:49	4.21 mi (6.78 km)	200 yd (180 m)
EF1	Numerous trees were snapped or uprooted. The roof of a manufactured home sustained significant damage.						
EF1	SW of Girard to NNE of Rayville	Richland	LA	32.4718°N 91.8204°W	18:53–19:01	7.37 mi (11.86 km)	1,000 yd (910 m)
EF1	In Girard, power lines were downed, and a couple sheds were damaged. Several homes sustained roof and fascia damage north of Rayville, and a couple sheds were destroyed. Numerous trees were downed along the path.						
EF0	SSE of Rayville	Richland	LA	32.3733°N 91.7256°W	19:03–19:06	1.78 mi (2.86 km)	25 yd (23 m)
EF0	This small tornado tore much of the roof off a large metal barn, destroyed two carports, and downed several trees, one of which fell on a home.						
EF1	ENE of Winnsboro	Franklin	LA	32.1463°N 91.6868°W	19:10–19:16	6.79 mi (10.93 km)	350 yd (320 m)
EF1	Several homes sustained minor roof and fascia damage, a mobile home was damaged, and a shed was destroyed. Several trees were downed, with one large tree falling on a home.						
EF2	Southern Tallulah, LA to NE of Eagle Bend, MS	Madison (LA), Warren (MS)	LA, MS	32.3938°N 91.1901°W	19:51–20:09	17.27 mi (27.79 km)	300 yd (270 m)
EF2	In Tallulah, a school suffered considerable damage and lost a large portion of its roof, homes sustained varying degrees of roof damage, and several mobile homes were damaged, one of which was significantly damaged after being pushed off its blocks. A brick arch was destroyed at a cemetery, and metal buildings were heavily damaged at a baseball field in town. Outside of Tallulah, several irrigation pivots were overturned and a tractor shed was demolished. In Mississippi, some structures sustained damage to metal roofs and carports. Large trees, power poles, and fences were downed along the path as well, including one tree that fell through a house. The tornado crossed the Mississippi/Louisiana state line three times.						
EF1	WSW of Winstonville to S of Duncan	Bolivar	MS	33.902°N 90.8206°W	20:19–20:26	7.92 mi (12.75 km)	450 yd (410 m)
EF1	Several houses sustained exterior and roof damage, including the collapse of their chimneys, carports, and metal siding. A small farm outbuilding suffered roof damage, while trees and wooden power poles were snapped.						
EF1	Cleveland	Bolivar	MS	33.7434°N 90.7231°W	20:31–20:32	0.96 mi (1.54 km)	75 yd (69 m)
EF1	Several houses and businesses were damaged in Cleveland, including a few structures that lost portions of their roofs. A car dealership and hair salon had their windows shattered, and glass from the salon injured one person. A gas station canopy and metal outbuilding were also damaged.						
EF1	NNW of Edwards to NNW of Bolton	Warren, Hinds	MS	32.4563°N 90.6253°W	20:41–20:47	5.97 mi (9.61 km)	100 yd (91 m)
EF1	Numerous trees were snapped or uprooted by this tornado, which crossed the path of an EF2 tornado from just eight days prior.						
EF1	NNW of Bentonia to ESE of Eden	Yazoo	MS	32.7443°N 90.4030°W	20:58–21:17	16.63 mi (26.76 km)	700 yd (640 m)
EF1	Numerous trees were snapped or uprooted, some of which were downed onto a manufactured home. Homes, outbuildings, and barns sustained roof damage. One shed was completely demolished. The tornado crossed the damage path of a tornado just a week prior.						
EF1	S of Cruger to ESE of Sidon	Holmes, Carroll	MS	33.2742°N 90.2428°W	21:21–21:31	11.53 mi (18.56 km)	1,700 yd (1,600 m)
EF1	This large tornado overturned a center pivot irrigation system and snapped or uprooted numerous trees. Two homes had portions of their roofs removed. A manufactured home was demolished, with a man inside being thrown and injured. Several power poles were downed, and a small shed and a grain storage bin were damaged. A metal building had a large roll-up door blown inward, and a portion of the back of the building was blown outward.						
EF1	Midway to Byram	Hinds	MS	32.1673°N 90.3886°W	21:26–21:36	6.44 mi (10.36 km)	350 yd (320 m)
EF1	Numerous trees were snapped or uprooted as the tornado passed through the community of Spring Ridge, including one large tree that fell through a house.						
EF1	Pope to W of Burgess	Panola	MS	34.211°N 89.945°W	21:37–21:56	16.2 mi (26.1 km)	200 yd (180 m)
EF1	Many trees, power poles, and power lines were downed in Pope, including a tree that fell onto a home. Large trees were snapped elsewhere, a mobile home was severely damaged, and several frame homes sustained extensive roof and siding damage.						
EF1	Jackson	Hinds	MS	32.2821°N 90.2274°W	21:41–21:45	2.94 mi (4.73 km)	350 yd (320 m)
EF1	This tornado was broadcast live on local TV news by weather cameras as it moved through parts of downtown Jackson. About a dozen homes had minor to moderate damage, and several businesses sustained roof damage. Numerous trees, fences, and power lines were downed. One person was injured.						
EF1	N of Jackson to NE of Flowood	Hinds, Rankin	MS	32.3336°N 90.2051°W	21:43–21:56	8.46 mi (13.62 km)	200 yd (180 m)
EF1	This tornado tracked along a discontinuous path, causing sporadic tree and house damage. Falling trees caused additional damage to structures. Multiple utility lines were downed. A large portion of the outfield wall to the Smith–Wills Stadium was downed.						
EF1	WNW of Vaiden to S of Winona	Carroll	MS	33.351°N 89.8066°W	21:52–22:00	6.11 mi (9.83 km)	250 yd (230 m)
EF1	Many trees were snapped or uprooted along the path.						
EF1	SE of Canton	Madison	MS	32.543°N 89.9943°W	21:56–22:03	5.26 mi (8.47 km)	350 yd (320 m)
EF1	Trees were damaged and uprooted.						
EF0	NW of Thompsonville	Franklin	IL	37.9507°N 88.8089°W	22:23–22:31	4.05 mi (6.52 km)	100 yd (91 m)
EF0	Three outbuildings were partially damaged, a few houses sustained shingle damage, and trees were snapped or uprooted.						
EF1	NE of Ellard to N of Sarepta	Calhoun	MS	34.0492°N 89.3786°W	22:24–22:32	7.63 mi (12.28 km)	100 yd (91 m)
EF1	Twenty power poles were destroyed, several homes and outbuildings were damaged, and a manufactured home was shifted. Numerous trees were snapped or uprooted.						
EF2	NNW of Redwater to SSE of Ethel	Leake, Attala	MS	32.8799°N 89.5716°W	22:32–22:43	10.65 mi (17.14 km)	1,200 yd (1,100 m)
EF2	This large and significant tornado destroyed multiple sheds and snapped or uprooted thousands of large trees along its path. Several homes and a church had damage to their roofs, including a few structures that sustained considerable roof damage.						
EF0	SSW of Fairfield	Wayne	IL	38.3586°N 88.3813°W	23:01–23:02	0.3 mi (0.48 km)	50 yd (46 m)
EF0	This very brief tornado damaged shingles on a few homes. A couple outbuildings sustained minor damage. Some large tree branches were snapped.						
EF1	ENE of Norris City to Carmi	White	IL	38.0077°N 88.2352°W	23:11–23:18	6.62 mi (10.65 km)	400 yd (370 m)
EF1	At least a dozen homes and a church had shingles torn off in Carmi, a sign was blown over, and a storage shed at the edge of town was destroyed. Additional damage occurred outside of town as well, where a few sheds and outbuildings were damaged or destroyed, a couple of homes sustained minor roof damage, and a small boat was blown into a pond. Trees and power poles and lines were downed along the path as well.						
EF1	Roseland	Tangipahoa	LA	30.7557°N 90.5106°W	23:12–23:20	6.09 mi (9.80 km)	150 yd (140 m)
EF1	Trees and tree limbs were downed in Roseland. Several homes and mobile homes were significantly damaged outside of town, including one double-wide mobile home that was lifted off of its blocks and had its roof torn off. Trees were snapped or uprooted, outbuildings were destroyed, and a wooden post was speared through the windshield of a vehicle.						
EF1	NE of Denmark to Jackson	Madison	TN	35.57°N 88.948°W	23:18–23:27	8.49 mi (13.66 km)	175 yd (160 m)
EF1	Several homes sustained roof damage near the beginning of the path, a few of which were heavily damaged. At a manufacturing facility, the exterior wall of a large metal building was peeled off its frame, and several large roll-up doors were blown in. Several metal power poles were bent at that location, and several businesses were damaged farther along the path. The tornado then entered Jackson before dissipating, where Jackson-Madison County General Hospital was damaged, the roof was blown off a nearby nursing home, and a light pole was damaged at a baseball field. Numerous trees were snapped or uprooted along the path.						
EF1	N of Oakfield to ENE of Medina	Madison, Gibson	TN	35.7456°N 88.7898°W	23:31–23:38	7.09 mi (11.41 km)	250 yd (230 m)
EF1	Trees and outbuildings were damaged along the path.						
EF1	Huntingdon	Carroll	TN	35.937°N 88.516°W	23:50–00:00	9.22 mi (14.84 km)	150 yd (140 m)
EF1	Several homes sustained roof and window damage, and a metal building in town was damaged as well. Many trees were downed in and around Huntingdon.						
EF1	S of Saint Wendel	Posey, Vanderburgh	IN	38.0666°N 87.7176°W	23:59–00:00	1.01 mi (1.63 km)	75 yd (69 m)
EF1	Two homes sustained shingle and roof gutter damage. Dozens of trees were snapped or uprooted.						
EF0	SE of Aberdeen	Monroe	MS	33.7970°N 88.5221°W	00:16–00:26	7.67 mi (12.34 km)	150 yd (140 m)
EF0	Trees were snapped and uprooted by this tornado.						
EF1	SW of West Hattiesburg	Lamar	MS	31.2645°N 89.4659°W	00:44–00:47	1.85 mi (2.98 km)	425 yd (389 m)
EF1	Trees were snapped and uprooted, and a house sustained roof damage.						
EF0	Purvis	Lamar, Forrest	MS	31.145°N 89.4044°W	00:44–00:52	7.29 mi (11.73 km)	25 yd (23 m)
EF0	This weak tornado removed a portion of a gas station canopy in town, caused minor tree damage, and downed a sign. A portion of a metal roof was blown off a structure as well.						
EF0	Big Branch	St. Tammany	LA	30.3204°N 90.0182°W	00:45–00:48	1.74 mi (2.80 km)	50 yd (46 m)
EF0	A waterspout moved ashore from Lake Pontchartrain, downing a few trees in the Big Branch Marsh National Wildlife Refuge. This tornado's path was within 100 yd (91 m) of an EF1 tornado that was part of a separate tornado outbreak over a week prior.						
EF0	N of Enterprise	Clarke	MS	32.186°N 88.8433°W	01:01–01:04	2.13 mi (3.43 km)	125 yd (114 m)
EF0	A home had a small section of its metal roofing removed, and a second house sustained minor shingle damage. Trees were damaged and uprooted as well.						
EF1	ENE of Enterprise	Clarke, Lauderdale	MS	32.2233°N 88.7066°W	01:06–01:13	3.66 mi (5.89 km)	50 yd (46 m)
EF1	A majority of the wooden fence around the Clarkdale Attendance Center softball field was knocked down. A small portion of metal roofing was lifted off a building, and the awning over the dugout was ripped off, causing the structure to fail. A section of bleachers were damaged, and a small metal building was lifted off its foundation. Several trees were snapped as well. This same area was hit by an EF2 tornado the following month on April 13, 2022.						
EF2	NE of Macon	Noxubee	MS	33.1008°N 88.4691°W	01:08–01:20	10.99 mi (17.69 km)	400 yd (370 m)
EF2	This high-end EF2 tornado tore a large portion of the roof from a house, and damaged or destroyed several metal storage buildings and outbuildings. Concrete pillars from one outbuilding, which were rebared into a steel plate, were pulled from the ground and one was missing. A mobile home was rolled and destroyed; two people inside were thrown into a wooded area and injured. Another mobile home sustained minor roof damage, while chicken houses were damaged, and numerous trees and power poles were snapped.						
EF2	SW of Maxie to WSW of Janice	Forrest, Perry	MS	30.9197°N 89.2525°W	01:11–01:22	11.26 mi (18.12 km)	500 yd (460 m)
EF2	Numerous large trees were snapped or uprooted, several homes sustained roof damage, and an RV was rolled. Several outbuildings suffered extensive damage as well.						
EF1	SE of Marion	Lauderdale	MS	32.3415°N 88.5384°W	01:24–01:34	6.64 mi (10.69 km)	200 yd (180 m)
EF1	Numerous trees were snapped or uprooted, power lines were downed, and an old gas station canopy was toppled.						
EF1	S of Toomsuba	Lauderdale	MS	32.3844°N 88.4942°W	01:31–01:37	3.88 mi (6.24 km)	250 yd (230 m)
EF1	This tornado began just south of the previous one, causing significant structural damage to the roof and exterior wall of a manufactured home. A shed had tin ripped off and its cinder block walls were shifted. Numerous trees were snapped or uprooted.						
EF1	SW of Woodwards	Wayne	MS	31.6558°N 88.71°W	01:43–01:45	0.47 mi (0.76 km)	50 yd (46 m)
EF1	This brief tornado partially uplifted the roof deck and ripped off shingles from a house. Several trees were snapped or uprooted.						
EF1	SSW of Woodwards	Wayne	MS	31.6636°N 88.6886°W	01:45–01:47	0.21 mi (0.34 km)	50 yd (46 m)
EF1	Multiple trees were snapped or uprooted, two of which landed on nearby houses. A manufactured home also sustained damage to its roof.						
EF2	McLain	Perry, Greene	MS	31.0954°N 88.8476°W	01:46–01:49	2.05 mi (3.30 km)	250 yd (230 m)
EF2	This strong tornado struck McLain, where homes had carports and metal roofing torn off, one of which lost most of its roof. A church sustained roof damage, and a single-story apartment building in town had its entire roof ripped off and was partially destroyed, though the structure was poorly constructed. Some chicken houses were destroyed and sheds were significantly damaged, with sheet metal wrapped around trees. Numerous large trees were snapped or uprooted, some of which fell on houses, and a manufactured home was rolled onto its side.						
EF1	Northwestern Waynesboro	Wayne	MS	31.6797°N 88.6714°W	01:47–01:50	1.88 mi (3.03 km)	30 yd (27 m)
EF1	The exterior cinder-block wall of a small car wash was partially collapsed. Numerous trees were snapped or uprooted, and other structures in town sustained minor roof damage.						
EF1	NNE of York to Northern Livingston	Sumter	AL	32.5479°N 88.2675°W	01:51–02:02	5.62 mi (9.04 km)	600 yd (550 m)
EF1	Swaths of trees were snapped or uprooted by this tornado, including multiple trees that were downed in the northern part Livingston shortly before the tornado dissipated.						
EF1	NW of Denham	Wayne	MS	31.6648°N 88.542°W	01:55–01:56	0.27 mi (0.43 km)	50 yd (46 m)
EF1	This brief tornado caused minor roof damage to homes and snapped or uprooted several trees. A medium-sized storage building lost half its roofing material.						
EF1	S of Gordo to NE of Echola	Pickens, Tuscaloosa	AL	33.2126°N 87.9089°W	02:02–02:21	16.59 mi (26.70 km)	450 yd (410 m)
EF1	This tornado downed numerous trees, some of which fell on houses. Homes, barns, and outbuildings were damaged, and some chicken houses were damaged or destroyed.						
EF1	WNW of Tishabee to SE of Allison	Greene	AL	32.6462°N 88.0263°W	02:10–02:21	8.81 mi (14.18 km)	275 yd (251 m)
EF1	Many trees were snapped or uprooted, some of which damaged manufactured homes upon falling. Two manufactured homes were destroyed, and additional houses and farm buildings were damaged.						
EF2	NNW of Silas to SE of Myrtlewood	Choctaw, Marengo	AL	31.8259°N 88.3385°W	02:12–02:57	39.32 mi (63.28 km)	1,350 yd (1,230 m)
EF2	Multiple trees and power lines were downed, and a few homes sustained roof damage in Choctaw County. The most intense damage occurred as the tornado crossed the Tombigbee River into southwestern parts of Marengo County, causing significant damage near Nanafalia. Hundreds of trees were snapped or uprooted, and a manufactured home was completely destroyed, with the undercarriage rolled at least 30 yards (27 m) from its foundation. A brick home sustained roof damage due to winds and a falling tree, and another house lost large portions of its roof and exterior walls. More homes sustained minor damage, and an abandoned manufactured home was rolled before the tornado dissipated. In November 2023, this tornado was reanalyzed and had its path length in Choctaw County adjusted from 18.27 mi (29.40 km) to 20.16 mi (32.44 km) due to notable tree damage and defoliation of vegetation noted on Sentinel satellite imagery.						
EF2	S of Marion to E of Sprott	Perry	AL	32.5475°N 87.2944°W	02:33–02:41	6 mi (9.7 km)	620 yd (570 m)
EF2	A large swath of trees was completely mowed down in a remote forested area as a result of this strong tornado.						
EF1	NW of Akron	Greene	AL	32.9285°N 87.7809°W	02:38–02:40	1.17 mi (1.88 km)	270 yd (250 m)
EF1	Dozens of trees were snapped or uprooted, some of which damaged homes upon falling. Some homes also suffered significant roof damage.						
EF1	W of Vancleave	Jackson	MS	30.5204°N 88.8202°W	02:47–02:51	2.51 mi (4.04 km)	100 yd (91 m)
EF1	Multiple mobile homes had undercarriage and roof damage and were shifted off their foundations, but none of the anchor straps broke. There was additional minor roof damage to a well-built home and damage to a nearby barn, along with two uprooted trees.						
EF3	S of Brent to Montevallo	Perry, Bibb, Shelby	AL	32.7471°N 87.1201°W	02:53–03:24	29.24 mi (47.06 km)	1,200 yd (1,100 m)
EF3	The most intense damage from this large and strong tornado occurred in remote forested areas, where tens of thousands of large trees were snapped and uprooted along a wide swath, with some trunks left partially debarked. Camper units were rolled or destroyed at a hunting club, and several homes were damaged by tornadic winds and falling trees. The tornado weakened as it approached and struck the University of Montevallo campus, where trees were downed and dormitory building roofs were damaged before tornado dissipated. Two people were injured.						
EF1	NE of Holt	Tuscaloosa	AL	33.2447°N 87.4525°W	03:10–03:16	3.88 mi (6.24 km)	400 yd (370 m)
EF1	Numerous trees were snapped, a few of which fell on RVs.						
EF1	Faunsdale	Marengo	AL	32.4512°N 87.6053°W	03:25–03:27	1.03 mi (1.66 km)	180 yd (160 m)
EF1	This tornado caused considerable damage in the downtown part of Faunsdale. The roof and an exterior wall were removed from the Faunsdale Bar and Grill, tin panels were peeled back from the roof of a metal warehouse, and other structures sustained partial roof removal as well. A couple of outbuilding structures were destroyed, and several trees and tree limbs were downed.						
EF0	SW of Tanner Williams, AL	Jackson (MS), Mobile (AL)	MS, AL	30.6894°N 88.4184°W	03:30–03:34	1.88 mi (3.03 km)	50 yd (46 m)
EF0	Trees were damaged by this weak tornado.						
EF1	NW of Whatley	Clarke	AL	31.6641°N 87.7298°W	03:33–03:34	0.15 mi (0.24 km)	75 yd (69 m)
EF1	A large metal building structure lost most of its roof and some exterior metal walls, and many trees were snapped or uprooted. The tornado was associated with a broader swath of 90–95 mph (145–155 km/h) straight-line winds.						
EF0	E of Big Creek Lake	Mobile	AL	30.7528°N 88.3150°W	03:41–03:43	0.57 mi (0.92 km)	20 yd (18 m)
EF0	This brief tornado blew metal roofs off multiple sheds and snapped large trees.						
EF0	N of Mobile Regional Airport	Mobile	AL	30.7246°N 88.2514°W	03:43–03:44	0.71 mi (1.14 km)	30 yd (27 m)
EF0	This brief tornado snapped a couple of trees and did minor roof damage to a home.						
EF0	ENE of Safford	Dallas	AL	32.2915°N 87.3469°W	03:43–03:46	2.76 mi (4.44 km)	175 yd (160 m)
EF0	Trees were sporadically snapped or uprooted. A barn was destroyed, with its debris deposited several hundred yards downwind.						
EF1	Theodore to E of Tillmans Corner	Mobile	AL	30.557°N 88.1414°W	03:58–04:01	3.01 mi (4.84 km)	30 yd (27 m)
EF1	Several power poles were snapped, a carport was destroyed, a street sign was downed, and several homes and businesses sustained roof damage in Theodore. Several trees were snapped or uprooted as well.						
EF1	Camden	Wilcox	AL	32.002°N 87.302°W	04:09–04:11	0.77 mi (1.24 km)	170 yd (160 m)
EF1	Numerous trees were snapped and uprooted in and around town, and a small barn was damaged.						
EF0	Point Clear	Baldwin	AL	30.4668°N 87.9152°W	04:22–04:23	0.55 mi (0.89 km)	50 yd (46 m)
EF0	A few trees and tree limbs were downed in Point Clear.						
EF0	ENE of Rosinston	Baldwin	AL	30.6353°N 87.6288°W	04:50–04:53	1.34 mi (2.16 km)	30 yd (27 m)
EF0	The tops of trees were snapped by this small, weak tornado.						
EF1	S of Chelsea	Shelby	AL	33.2649°N 86.6431°W	04:58–05:06	4.52 mi (7.27 km)	135 yd (123 m)
EF1	Several outbuildings were destroyed, numerous homes suffered considerable roof damage, and numerous trees were snapped or uprooted by this high-end EF1 tornado. Several hundred feet of pasture fencing were destroyed at a power substation, and a barn lost a majority of its outer walls.						
EF0	Lowndesboro to SE of Autaugaville	Lowndes	AL	32.2663°N 86.6128°W	05:09–05:13	2.89 mi (4.65 km)	125 yd (114 m)
EF0	This tornado touched down in Lowndesboro, where a building at the Lowndes Academy lost its metal roof, numerous historic homes in town sustained minor roof damage, and one sustained more significant roof removal due to its front porch being uplifted. Dozens of trees were snapped or uprooted, and minor damage occurred outside of town before the tornado dissipated.						
EF0	E of Gonzalez	Escambia	FL	30.5751°N 87.261°W	05:25–05:26	0.32 mi (0.51 km)	50 yd (46 m)
EF0	Fencing, roofs, and siding sustained minor damage, and a couple of trees were snapped or uprooted.						
EF1	NNW of Pace	Santa Rosa	FL	30.6415°N 87.1849°W	05:32–05:34	0.39 mi (0.63 km)	50 yd (46 m)
EF1	Multiple homes had substantial portions of their roofing removed, and many trees were snapped or uprooted.						
EF1	Avalon	Santa Rosa	FL	30.52°N 87.1429°W	05:37–05:47	5.96 mi (9.59 km)	100 yd (91 m)
EF1	This tornado began over the Escambia Bay Bridge, overturning a semi-truck and injuring two occupants. It moved onshore from Escambia Bay into Avalon, causing widespread tree damage. A personal weather station recorded a peak gust of 97 mph (156 km/h), and multiple homes suffered roof and window damage. Street signs were downed, and some siding and roofing material was removed from the Avalon Utilities building as well.						

=== March 31 event ===
List of confirmed tornadoes – Thursday, March 31, 2022
EF#	Location	County / Parish	State	Start Coord.	Time (UTC)	Path length	Max width
EF3	E of Wausau to SSE of Cottondale	Washington, Jackson	FL	30.6376°N 85.5108°W	09:09–09:24	12.14 mi (19.54 km)	200 yd (180 m)
EF3	2 deaths – A strong tornado touched down near Wausau and passed to the northwest of Alford before dissipating, causing severe damage along its path. Multiple anchored single and double-wide mobile homes were thrown and obliterated, with debris scattered long distances through fields. Two people were killed in the destruction of a double-wide mobile home, and another person was injured after being thrown from a single-wide mobile home into a wooded area. The most intense damage was inflicted to a frame home that was completely swept away with only its block foundation remaining, and to a well-built brick home that had its roof torn off and exterior walls collapsed. Other residences were damaged to a lesser degree, while barns and outbuildings were destroyed and farming equipment was damaged. Numerous trees were snapped or uprooted along the path, projectiles were embedded into the ground, vehicles were moved and damaged, and a generator was ripped from its anchoring and thrown across a field. In addition to the two fatalities, three people were injured.						
EF2	Wayne Township	Armstrong	PA	40.8332°N 79.374°W	15:47–15:56	8.55 mi (13.76 km)	350 yd (320 m)
EF2	A strong multiple-vortex tornado snapped or uprooted hundreds of large hardwood trees in a wooded area. Two barns were destroyed, and metal roofing was ripped from a small outbuilding as well.						
EF2	SW of Norwood	Anson, Stanly	NC	35.1042°N 80.2373°W	17:22–17:31	7.24 mi (11.65 km)	200 yd (180 m)
EF2	A brick home was shifted off its foundation, with several of its exterior walls blown out and more than half of its roof removed. Tin roofing was ripped from an agricultural building, and a chicken farm was significantly damaged.						
EF1	SE of Nelson	Durham	NC	35.8672°N 78.8372°W	19:49–19:50	0.22 mi (0.35 km)	100 yd (91 m)
EF1	A brief, fast-moving tornado downed multiple trees, dislodged an HVAC unit from a warehouse roof, and damaged a fence.						
EF1	NNE of Turbotville to Lairdsville	Montour, Lycoming	PA	41.16°N 76.73°W	20:38–20:42	9.14 mi (14.71 km)	500 yd (460 m)
EF1	A tornado demolished three barns, one of which was thrown across a yard, with a piece of its lumber impaled into the hood of a Jeep. Wood from a second barn was thrown through a truck windshield, shattering the window and sending glass into the eye of a passenger. Multiple homes and outbuildings in Lairdsville suffered damage, a butcher shop was also damaged, and hundreds of trees were downed.						
EF0	Centreville	Fairfax	VA	38.8653°N 77.4579°W	00:22–00:23	0.05 mi (0.080 km)	30 yd (27 m)
EF0	About a dozen and a half trees were snapped or uprooted by this very brief and weak tornado.						
EF0	Tysons Corner	Fairfax	VA	38.9196°N 77.2259°W	00:41–00:42	0.13 mi (0.21 km)	50 yd (46 m)
EF0	Two gas stations sustained minor damage, and lightweight objects were thrown and lofted by this brief and weak tornado.						
EF1	NW of Dublin	Bucks	PA	40.3790°N 75.2266°W	01:48–01:52	2.01 mi (3.23 km)	100 yd (91 m)
EF1	A few homes and an apartment complex lost shingles and sustained minor exterior damage. A CVS pharmacy also sustained minor damage, and trees were uprooted or snapped, including one tree that fell on a parked vehicle.						

== Impact ==
Amtrak's Texas Eagle was heavily delayed by severe weather that moved through the Texarkana area on the morning of March 30. The City of New Orleans and the Cardinal were also delayed by downed trees and other debris blocking the right-of-way on March 31. The northbound and southbound Carolinian were both delayed by severe warnings in Virginia. Intense winds relating to the system on March 31 forced flight cancellations out of major airports in Washington DC, Baltimore, New York City and Boston, as well as lead to a 3-car pileup in Iota, Louisiana.

Intense gradient winds ahead of the severe storms downed numerous trees and power lines in Alabama. Arcing power lines sparked over 60 wildfires in the state as well.

== See also ==
- Weather of 2022
- List of North American tornadoes and tornado outbreaks
- List of tornadoes striking downtown areas of large cities
