= Tanglewood (Akron, Alabama) =

Historic house in Alabama, United States

- U.S. National Register of Historic Places
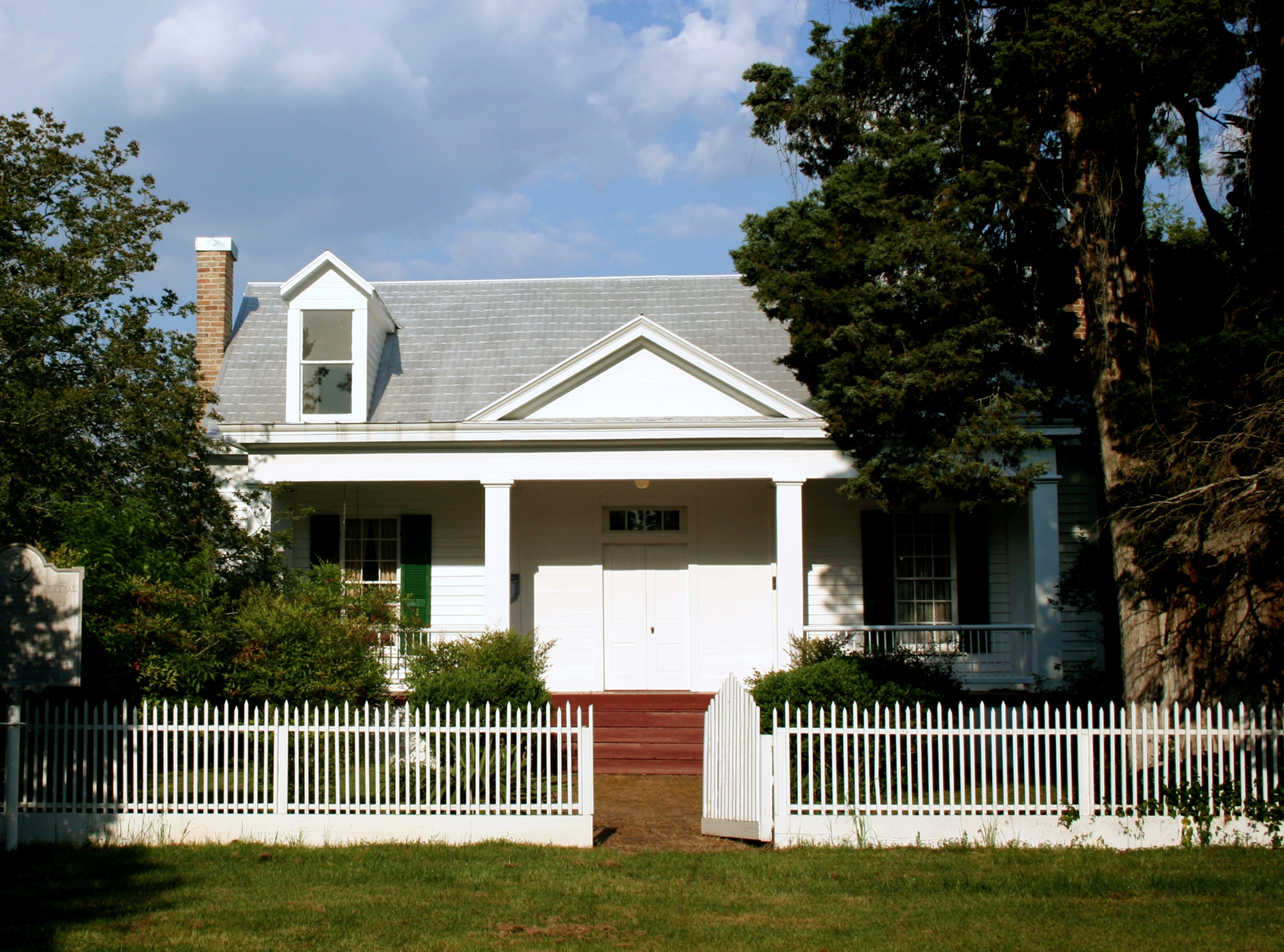
- Tanglewood in 2008

- Location within Alabama Location within the United States
- Nearest city: Akron, Alabama
- Coordinates: 32°51′11.38″N 87°40′21.03″W
- Area: 480 acres (190 ha)
- Built: 1859
- Architect: Page Harris
- Architectural style: Greek Revival
- NRHP reference No.: 73000346
- Added to NRHP: April 11, 1973

Tanglewood is a historic plantation house in Akron, Alabama, United States. The Greek Revival cottage was built in 1859 by Page Harris, on land that he had purchased in 1824. It was given to the University of Alabama as a memorial to Nicholene Bishop in 1949 and the grounds are now used as a 480-acre (190 ha) nature reserve known as the J. Nicholene Bishop Biological Station. It is used by the university to aid undergraduate and graduate research in biodiversity and environmental processes. The house was added to the National Register of Historic Places on April 11, 1973, due to its architectural significance.
