= Taopi, Minnesota =

City in Minnesota, United States

- City
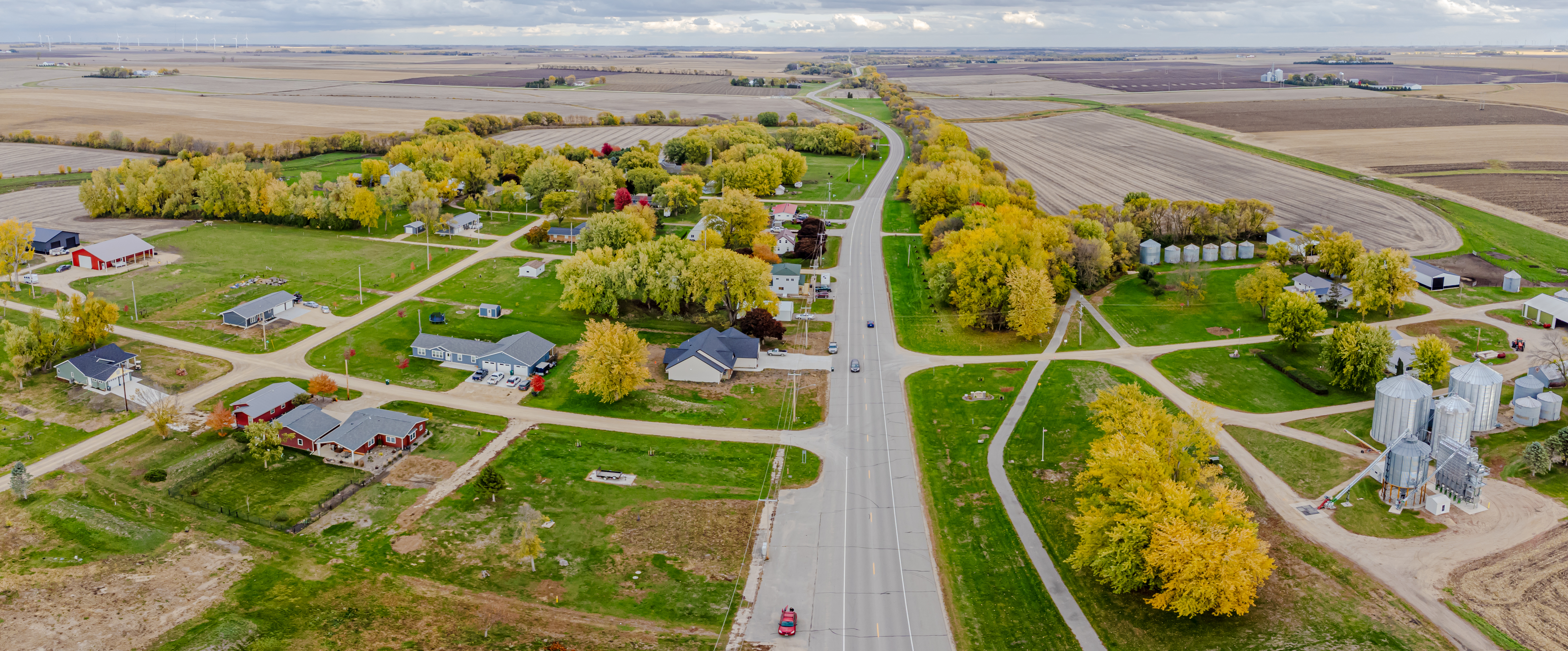
- MN-56 runs through Taopi.

- Location in Mower County and the state of Minnesota
- Coordinates: 43°33′27″N 92°38′25″W
- Country: United States
- State: Minnesota
- County: Mower

Area
  - Total: 0.39 sq mi (1.01 km^{2})
  - Land: 0.39 sq mi (1.01 km^{2})
  - Water: 0 sq mi (0.00 km^{2})
- Elevation: 1,342 ft (409 m)

Population (2024)
  - Total: 61
  - Density: 156.0/sq mi (60.24/km^{2})
- Time zone: UTC-6 (Central (CST))
  - Summer (DST): UTC-5 (CDT)
- ZIP code: 55977
- Area code: 507
- FIPS code: 27-64210
- GNIS feature ID: 2396030

Taopi (/teɪˈoʊpi/ tay-OH-pee) is a city in Mower County, Minnesota, United States. The population was 68 at the 2024 US Census. It is located near the source of the Wapsipinicon River.

== History ==
The name of the village is derived from Taopi, the native chief who befriended the settlers after the New Ulm massacre. It was platted in 1875 by the Taopi Farming Company in the name of John W. Wood. The first lot was bought by James Olberg, and J. Martz opened a furniture store there before moving the operation to Le Roy. Taopi had the largest steam-powered flour mill in southern Minnesota; it could process 300,000 bushels of wheat each year.

The village suffered significant damage from an EF2 tornado on April 12, 2022, part of the April 2022 North American storm complex. Two noncritical injuries were reported.

== Geography ==
Taopi is in southern Mower County and is surrounded by Lodi Township. Minnesota State Highway 56 passes through the city, leading west 4 miles (6 km) to Adams and southeast 8 miles (13 km) to Le Roy. Austin, the Mower county seat, is 21 miles (34 km) to the northwest via MN 56 and Interstate 90.

According to the U.S. Census Bureau, the city of Taopi has a total area of 0.39 square miles (1.01 km^{2}), all of it recorded as land. The North Branch of the Upper Iowa River passes through the east end of the city limits, with its source 3 miles (5 km) to the north. The source of the Wapsipinicon River is less than a mile south of the city limits.

== Demographics ==
Historical population
Census	Pop.	Note	%±
1880	115		—
1900	115		—
1910	140		21.7%
1920	153		9.3%
1930	102		−33.3%
1940	151		48.0%
1950	118		−21.9%
1960	92		−22.0%
1970	59		−35.9%
1980	96		62.7%
1990	83		−13.5%
2000	93		12.0%
2010	58		−37.6%
2020	61		5.2%
U.S. Decennial Census

=== 2010 census ===
As of the census of 2010, there were 58 people, 24 households, and 18 families living in the city. The population density was 148.7 inhabitants per square mile (57.4/km^{2}). There were 25 housing units at an average density of 64.1 per square mile (24.7/km^{2}). The racial makeup of the city was 100.0% White.

There were 24 households, of which 33.3% had children under the age of 18 living with them, 62.5% were married couples living together, 12.5% had a female householder with no husband present, and 25.0% were non-families. 25.0% of all households were made up of individuals, and 8.3% had someone living alone who was 65 years of age or older. The average household size was 2.42 and the average family size was 2.83.

The median age in the city was 38.5 years. 25.9% of residents were under the age of 18; 10.2% were between the ages of 18 and 24; 20.6% were from 25 to 44; 27.6% were from 45 to 64; and 15.5% were 65 years of age or older. The gender makeup of the city was 50.0% male and 50.0% female.

=== 2000 census ===
As of the census of 2000, there were 93 people, 33 households, and 26 families living in the city. The population density was 237.0 inhabitants per square mile (91.5/km^{2}). There were 34 housing units at an average density of 86.6 per square mile (33.4/km^{2}). The racial makeup of the city was 100.00% White.

There were 33 households, out of which 42.4% had children under the age of 18 living with them, 63.6% were married couples living together, 15.2% had a female householder with no husband present, and 18.2% were non-families. 15.2% of all households were made up of individuals, and 12.1% had someone living alone who was 65 years of age or older. The average household size was 2.82 and the average family size was 3.15.

In the city, the population was spread out, with 31.2% under the age of 18, 7.5% from 18 to 24, 31.2% from 25 to 44, 15.1% from 45 to 64, and 15.1% who were 65 years of age or older. The median age was 35 years. For every 100 females, there were 111.4 males. For every 100 females age 18 and over, there were 100.0 males.

The median income for a household in the city was $33,750, and the median income for a family was $30,000. Males had a median income of $28,125 versus $26,250 for females. The per capita income for the city was $11,250. There were 10.0% of families and 4.8% of the population living below the poverty line, including no under eighteens and none of those over 64.
