= Briensburg, Kentucky =

Unincorporated community in Kentucky, United States

Coordinates: 36°54′13″N 88°19′25″W

Briensburg is an unincorporated community in Marshall County, Kentucky, United States.

== History ==
Briensburg (also spelled historically Briensburgh) contained a post office from 1856 until 1905. Briensburg was incorporated in 1861.

Briensburg was hit by the deadly Western Kentucky EF4 tornado on December 10, 2021. The tornado was at EF2 intensity at this location, but still caused considerable damage in the community.
