= Fairmount, Louisville =

Neighborhood in Louisville, Kentucky

Coordinates: 38°06′58″N 85°34′17″W

Fairmount is a neighborhood of Louisville, Kentucky located along Bardstown Road (US 31E) and Fairmount Road.
