= Gilmore City, Iowa =

- City
- Motto: "Iowa's Limestone Capital"
- Location of Gilmore City, Iowa
- Coordinates: 42°43′36″N 94°26′13″W
- Country: USA
- State: Iowa
- Counties: Humboldt, Pocahontas

Area
  - Total: 1.24 sq mi (3.21 km^{2})
  - Land: 1.24 sq mi (3.21 km^{2})
  - Water: 0 sq mi (0.00 km^{2})
- Elevation: 1,221 ft (372 m)

Population (2020)
  - Total: 487
  - Density: 393.1/sq mi (151.76/km^{2})
- Time zone: UTC-6 (Central (CST))
  - Summer (DST): UTC-5 (CDT)
- ZIP code: 50541
- Area code: 515
- FIPS code: 19-30945
- GNIS feature ID: 2394902
- Website: Official website of Gilmore City, Iowa

Gilmore City is a city in Humboldt and Pocahontas counties in the U.S. state of Iowa. The population was 487 at the time of the 2020 census.

== History ==
Gilmore City was platted in 1884, not long after the railroad had been built through that territory in 1882.

Gilmore City was originally known as Blooming Prairie. The name was changed to Gilmore City in the early 1880s. The city was named for Charles N. Gilmore. Gilmore was the superintendent of the Fort Dodge & Des Moines rail line and later became division superintendent after the road was leased by the Rock Island Railway Company. Gilmore died in Des Moines on April 5, 1912. He is buried in Woodland Cemetery, Des Moines, Iowa. The community was incorporated on April 16, 1887.

Two quarries known as the Midwest Limestone Quarry and the Hallett Quarry were opened north of Gilmore City. Quicklime and dimension stone production began at least as early as 1882, and was succeeded by cement and aggregate production. Fossil crinoids were discovered in the quarries 1929. The Midwest Limestone Quarry is currently known as the Moore Quarry, owned by Martin Marietta Inc.

== Geography ==
According to the United States Census Bureau, the city has a total area of 1.25 square miles (3.24 km^{2}), all land. It contains one neighborhood, Stein's Rockin R Mobile Home Park, Iowa, on the Pocahontas side of town.

Gilmore City lies along the northeastern margin (rim) of Manson crater, an impact structure buried by glacial till and outwash.

== Demographics ==
Historical populations
Year	Pop.	±%
1900	687	—
1910	689	+0.3%
1920	919	+33.4%
1930	896	−2.5%
1940	908	+1.3%
1950	746	−17.8%
1960	688	−7.8%
1970	766	+11.3%
1980	626	−18.3%
1990	560	−10.5%
2000	556	−0.7%
2010	504	−9.4%
2020	487	−3.4%
Source:"U.S. Census website". United States Census Bureau. and Iowa Data Center; Source: U.S. Decennial Census

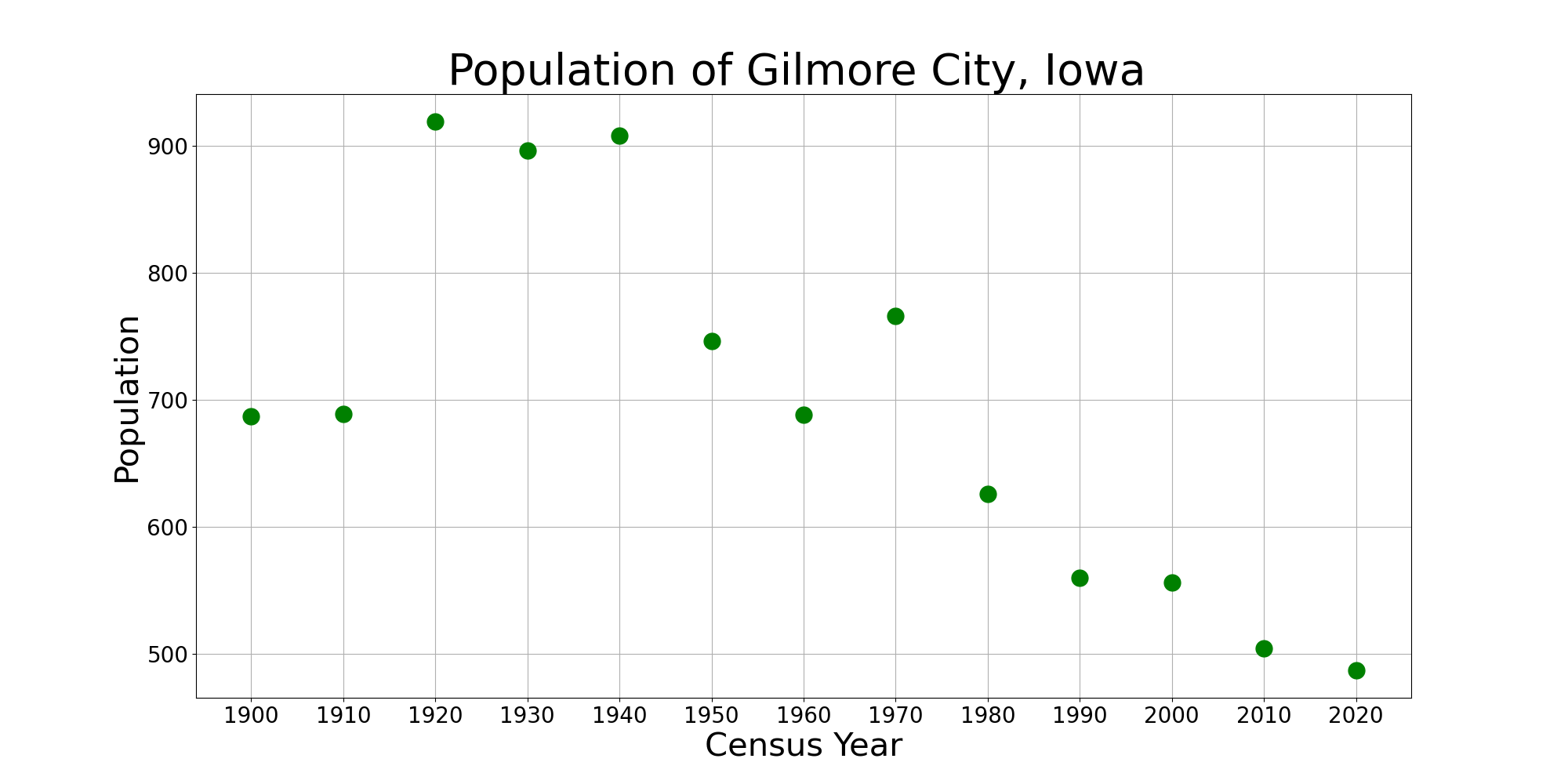
The population of Gilmore City, Iowa from US census data

=== 2020 census ===
As of the census of 2020, there were 487 people, 220 households, and 128 families residing in the city. The population density was 393.1 inhabitants per square mile (151.8/km^{2}). There were 254 housing units at an average density of 205.0 per square mile (79.2/km^{2}). The racial makeup of the city was 95.1% White, 0.2% Black or African American, 0.4% Native American, 0.0% Asian, 0.0% Pacific Islander, 0.4% from other races and 3.9% from two or more races. Hispanic or Latino persons of any race comprised 1.2% of the population.

Of the 220 households, 31.4% of which had children under the age of 18 living with them, 40.5% were married couples living together, 7.7% were cohabitating couples, 30.0% had a female householder with no spouse or partner present and 21.8% had a male householder with no spouse or partner present. 41.8% of all households were non-families. 37.3% of all households were made up of individuals, 21.4% had someone living alone who was 65 years old or older.

The median age in the city was 40.6 years. 28.7% of the residents were under the age of 20; 1.4% were between the ages of 20 and 24; 23.2% were from 25 and 44; 24.8% were from 45 and 64; and 21.8% were 65 years of age or older. The gender makeup of the city was 48.5% male and 51.5% female.

=== 2010 census ===
As of the census of 2010, there were 504 people, 239 households, and 136 families residing in the city. The population density was 403.2 inhabitants per square mile (155.7/km^{2}). There were 277 housing units at an average density of 221.6 per square mile (85.6/km^{2}). The racial makeup of the city was 97.8% White, 0.4% African American, 0.4% Asian, 0.4% from other races, and 1.0% from two or more races. Hispanic or Latino of any race were 1.6% of the population.

There were 239 households, of which 25.5% had children under the age of 18 living with them, 43.5% were married couples living together, 10.0% had a female householder with no husband present, 3.3% had a male householder with no wife present, and 43.1% were non-families. 38.5% of all households were made up of individuals, and 15.1% had someone living alone who was 65 years of age or older. The average household size was 2.11 and the average family size was 2.80.

The median age in the city was 45 years. 22.6% of residents were under the age of 18; 6.7% were between the ages of 18 and 24; 20.9% were from 25 to 44; 30.9% were from 45 to 64; and 19% were 65 years of age or older. The gender makeup of the city was 48.2% male and 51.8% female.

=== 2000 census ===
As of the census of 2000, there were 556 people, 257 households, and 160 families residing in the city. The population density was 448.5 inhabitants per square mile (173.2/km^{2}). There were 272 housing units at an average density of 219.4 per square mile (84.7/km^{2}). The racial makeup of the city was 98.38% White, 0.18% Asian, 0.90% from other races, and 0.54% from two or more races. Hispanic or Latino of any race were 1.08% of the population.

There were 257 households, out of which 25.7% had children under the age of 18 living with them, 49.0% were married couples living together, 8.6% had a female householder with no husband present, and 37.7% were non-families. 35.8% of all households were made up of individuals, and 20.2% had someone living alone who was 65 years of age or older. The average household size was 2.16 and the average family size was 2.75.

22.1% are under the age of 18, 7.0% from 18 to 24, 23.0% from 25 to 44, 25.0% from 45 to 64, and 22.8% who were 65 years of age or older. The median age was 44 years. For every 100 females, there were 91.7 males. For every 100 females age 18 and over, there were 90.7 males.

The median income for a household in the city was $31,827, and the median income for a family was $40,208. Males had a median income of $26,176 versus $21,389 for females. The per capita income for the city was $15,511. About 3.8% of families and 7.9% of the population were below the poverty line, including 5.4% of those under age 18 and 13.6% of those age 65 or over.

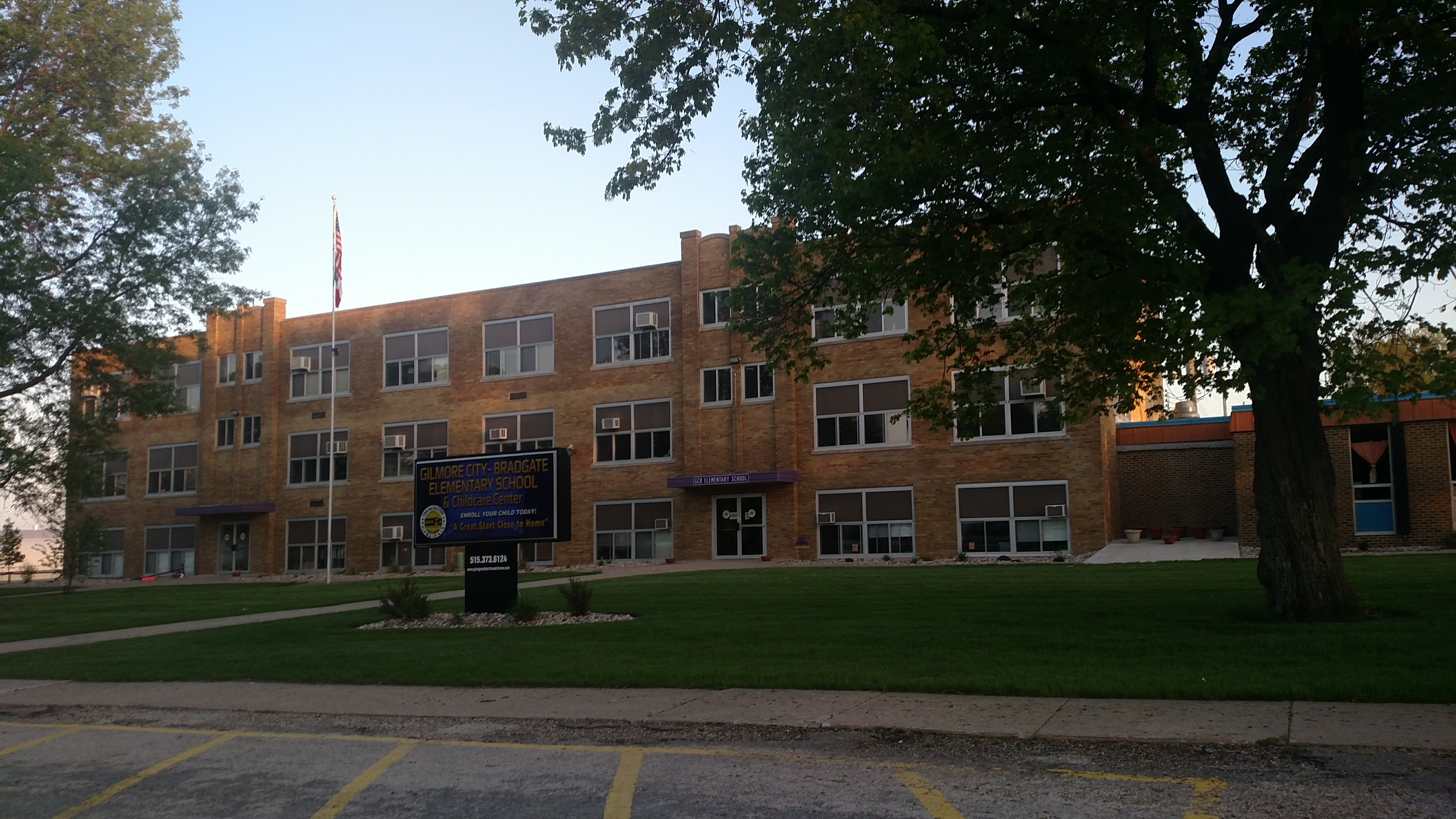
Gilmore City Bradgate Elementary School

== Education ==
It is within the Gilmore City–Bradgate Community School District.

Gilmore City has an elementary school with grade levels prep-kindergarten through the sixth grade. After the 2010–11 school year ended, the Gilmore City–Bradgate district created a joint agreement with the West Bend–Mallard Community School District. This moved all the students from seventh through twelfth grade to the West Bend–Mallard Middle School/High School which is located in West Bend.
