= Lodi Township, Mower County, Minnesota =

Lodi Township, Minnesota
- Township
- Location within the state of Minnesota Lodi Township, Minnesota (the United States)
- Coordinates: 43°33′2″N 92°36′59″W
- Country: United States
- State: Minnesota
- County: Mower

Area
  - Total: 35.6 sq mi (92.3 km^{2})
  - Land: 35.6 sq mi (92.3 km^{2})
  - Water: 0 sq mi (0.0 km^{2})
- Elevation: 1,348 ft (411 m)

Population (2000)
  - Total: 249
  - Density: 7.0/sq mi (2.7/km^{2})
- Time zone: UTC-6 (Central (CST))
  - Summer (DST): UTC-5 (CDT)
- FIPS code: 27-37808
- GNIS feature ID: 0664810

Lodi Township is a township in Mower County, Minnesota, in the United States. As of the 2000 census, the township population was 249. The largest town contained within the township is Taopi with 93 people. The remainder of the township is unincorporated area.

== History ==
Almond Fryer settled on the banks of the Upper Iowa River in section 14 of the township in 1855. The name at the time of surveying was Lodi, but when the township was organized in February 1874 it was called "Belleview," as was the railroad station. Lodi, Italy, the namesake of the township, is a town in Lombardy made famous by a battle that Napoleon fought there. At the organizing meeting, the people of the township re-adopted the name Lodi and elected a moderator, a clerk, three judges of the election, a chairman, two supervisors, a treasurer, two justices of the peace, and two constables. The current village of Taopi was started as a corporation in 1875.

== Geography ==
According to the United States Census Bureau, the township has a total area of 35.6 square miles (92.3 km^{2}), all land.

== Demographics ==
As of the census of 2000, there were 249 people, 85 households, and 73 families residing in the township. The population density was 7.0 inhabitants per square mile (2.7/km^{2}). There were 85 housing units at an average density of 2.4 per square mile (0.93/km^{2}). The racial makeup of the township was 97.99% White, 1.20% African American, and 0.80% from two or more races. Hispanic or Latino of any race were 0.40% of the population.

There were 85 households, out of which 35.3% had children under the age of 18 living with them, 78.8% were married couples living together, 2.4% had a female householder with no husband present, and 14.1% were non-families. 14.1% of all households were made up of individuals, and 4.7% had someone living alone who was 65 years of age or older. The average household size was 2.93 and the average family size was 3.19.

In the township the population was spread out, with 29.7% under the age of 18, 7.2% from 18 to 24, 27.3% from 25 to 44, 20.9% from 45 to 64, and 14.9% who were 65 years of age or older. The median age was 38 years. For every 100 females, there were 114.7 males. For every 100 females age 18 and over, there were 110.8 males.

The median income for a household in the township was $45,179, and the median income for a family was $45,714. Males had a median income of $28,125 versus $21,771 for females. The per capita income for the township was $17,504. About 11.8% of families and 12.3% of the population were below the poverty line, including 14.1% of those under the age of eighteen and 13.9% of those 65 or over.

== Cemetery ==
- Taopi Cemetery is located in the southeast corner of the southeast quadrant of section 9 of the township. Its oldest known burial dates to 1877.
