= Akron, Alabama =

- Town
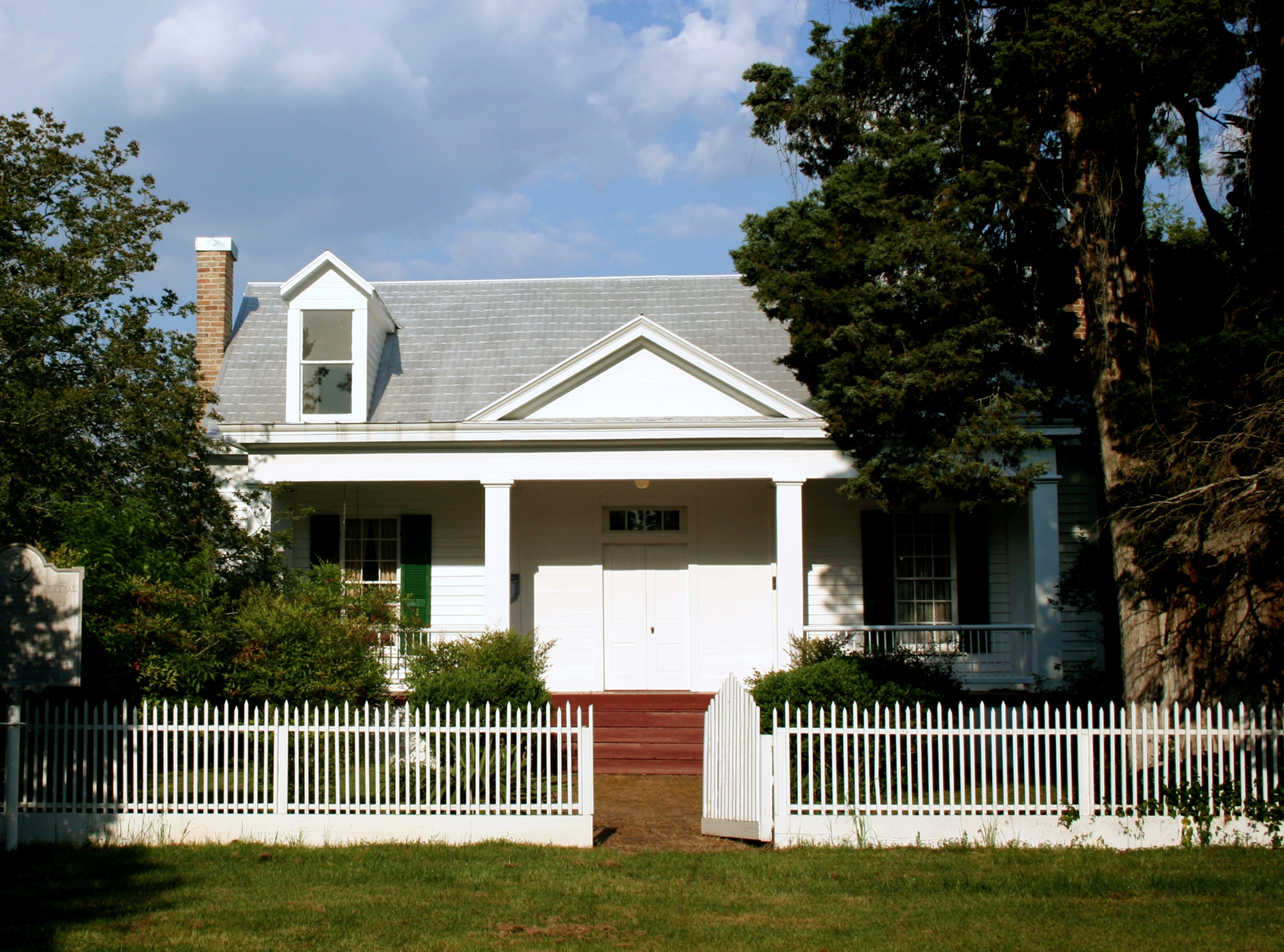
- Tanglewood in Akron

- Location of Akron in Hale County, Alabama.
- Coordinates: 32°52′34″N 87°44′32″W
- Country: United States
- State: Alabama
- County: Hale

Government
  - Type: Mayor-Council
  - Mayor: Christopher Rollins

Area
  - Total: 0.69 sq mi (1.79 km^{2})
  - Land: 0.69 sq mi (1.78 km^{2})
  - Water: 0.0039 sq mi (0.01 km^{2})
- Elevation: 131 ft (40 m)

Population (2020)
  - Total: 225
  - Density: 328.1/sq mi (126.68/km^{2})
- Time zone: UTC-6 (Central (CST))
  - Summer (DST): UTC-5 (CDT)
- ZIP code: 35441
- Area codes: 205, 659
- FIPS code: 01-00676
- GNIS feature ID: 2405125

Akron (/ˈækrɒn/) is a town in Hale County, Alabama, United States. On January 18, 1906, landowners Charles E. Waller, Charles Lichtman and M.H. Murphy sold at public auction a great number of individual business and residential lots which would be developed into the town of Akron, Alabama. Akron became the fastest growing town in Hale County, and in a few years had grown to include a modern post office, railroad depot, various retail businesses, barber shop, hotel, drug store, concrete and block factory, wheel spoke factory, lumber mills, and attractive residences. The town was incorporated in March 1918. As of the 2020 census, Akron had a population of 225. Akron has one site on the National Register of Historic Places, the Greek Revival cottage known as Tanglewood.

== Geography ==
Akron is located in northwestern Hale County 3 miles (5 km) southeast of the Black Warrior River and 1 mile (1.6 km) northwest of Alabama State Route 60. Greensboro, the Hale County seat, is 17 miles (27 km) to the southeast. Eutaw is 14 miles (23 km) by road to the southwest, and Moundville is the same distance to the northeast.

According to the United States Census Bureau, the town of Akron has a total area of 0.7 square miles (1.8 km^{2}), of which 0.004 square miles (0.01 km^{2}), or 0.77%, is water.

== Demographics ==
Historical population
Census	Pop.	Note	%±
1920	675		—
1930	793		17.5%
1940	504		−36.4%
1950	684		35.7%
1960	604		−11.7%
1970	535		−11.4%
1980	604		12.9%
1990	468		−22.5%
2000	521		11.3%
2010	356		−31.7%
2020	225		−36.8%
U.S. Decennial Census

Akron first appeared on the 1920 U.S. Census as an incorporated town. It was also the same name as its precinct/census division, which preceded it in reporting on the census since 1900 (See Akron Precinct below).

=== Racial and ethnic composition ===
Akron town, Alabama – Racial and ethnic composition Note: the US Census treats Hispanic/Latino as an ethnic category. This table excludes Latinos from the racial categories and assigns them to a separate category. Hispanics/Latinos may be of any race.
Race / Ethnicity (NH = Non-Hispanic)	Pop 2000	Pop 2010	Pop 2020	% 2000	% 2010	% 2020
White alone (NH)	92	46	19	17.66%	12.92%	8.44%
Black or African American alone (NH)	419	308	199	80.42%	86.52%	88.44%
Native American or Alaska Native alone (NH)	0	0	0	0.00%	0.00%	0.00%
Asian alone (NH)	0	0	2	0.00%	0.00%	0.89%
Native Hawaiian or Pacific Islander alone (NH)	0	0	0	0.00%	0.00%	0.00%
Other race alone (NH)	0	0	0	0.00%	0.00%	0.00%
Mixed race or Multiracial (NH)	2	1	4	0.38%	0.28%	1.78%
Hispanic or Latino (any race)	8	1	1	1.54%	0.28%	0.44%
Total	521	356	225	100.00%	100.00%	100.00%

=== 2010 census ===
As of the 2010 Census Akron had a population of 356. The racial and ethnic composition of the population was 86.5% black or African American, 13.2% white, 0.3% reporting two or more races and 0.3% Hispanic or Latino of any race.

As of the census of 2000, there were 521 people, 207 households, and 142 families residing in the town. The population density was 939.2 inhabitants per square mile (362.6/km^{2}). There were 239 housing units at an average density of 430.8 per square mile (166.3/km^{2}). The racial makeup of the town was 17.85% White, 81.00% Black or African American, and 1.15% from two or more races. 1.54% of the population were Hispanic or Latino of any race.

There were 207 households, out of which 36.7% had children under the age of 18 living with them, 34.8% were married couples living together, 30.9% had a female householder with no husband present, and 31.4% were non-families. 28.5% of all households were made up of individuals, and 14.5% had someone living alone who was 65 years of age or older. The average household size was 2.52 and the average family size was 3.15.

In the town, the population was spread out, with 29.4% under the age of 18, 9.8% from 18 to 24, 25.3% from 25 to 44, 20.9% from 45 to 64, and 14.6% who were 65 years of age or older. The median age was 32 years. For every 100 females, there were 81.5 males. For every 100 females age 18 and over, there were 68.8 males.

The median income for a household in the town was $19,875, and the median income for a family was $21,250. Males had a median income of $22,396 versus $18,500 for females. The per capita income for the town was $10,929. About 37.1% of families and 40.7% of the population were below the poverty line, including 60.2% of those under age 18 and 32.7% of those age 65 or over.

== Akron Precinct (1900-50)/Stewart-Akron Division (1960-) ==
Historical population
Census	Pop.	Note	%±
1900	1,090		—
1910	1,710		56.9%
1920	2,191		28.1%
1930	2,454		12.0%
1940	1,527		−37.8%
1950	1,714		12.2%
1960	2,883		68.2%
1970	2,064		−28.4%
1980	1,789		−13.3%
1990	1,745		−2.5%
2000	1,868		7.0%
2010	1,582		−15.3%
U.S. Decennial Census

Akron first appeared as the 2nd precinct of Hale County in 1900. Prior to this, from 1870 to 1890, the beat/precinct was previously known as New Prospect. In 1910, the 2nd precinct name was changed to "Evans", but reverted to Akron in 1920 and continued to report until 1950. In 1960, as part of a general reorganization of counties, Akron precinct was consolidated with others, including precinct 16, Stewart's Station, and was renamed the Stewart-Akron Census Division. Although the town of Akron has a heavily Black population, as did the former Akron precinct when it reported racial demographics in 1930–40, and in the Stewart-Akron division from 1960 to 1980, in 1990 it reported only a Black plurality. In 2000, it transitioned to a White plurality and in 2010, became a White majority for the first time.

== Notable person ==
- Riggs Stephenson, (1898–1985) was a left fielder in Major League Baseball for Chicago Cubs.
