= Alligator, Mississippi =

- Town
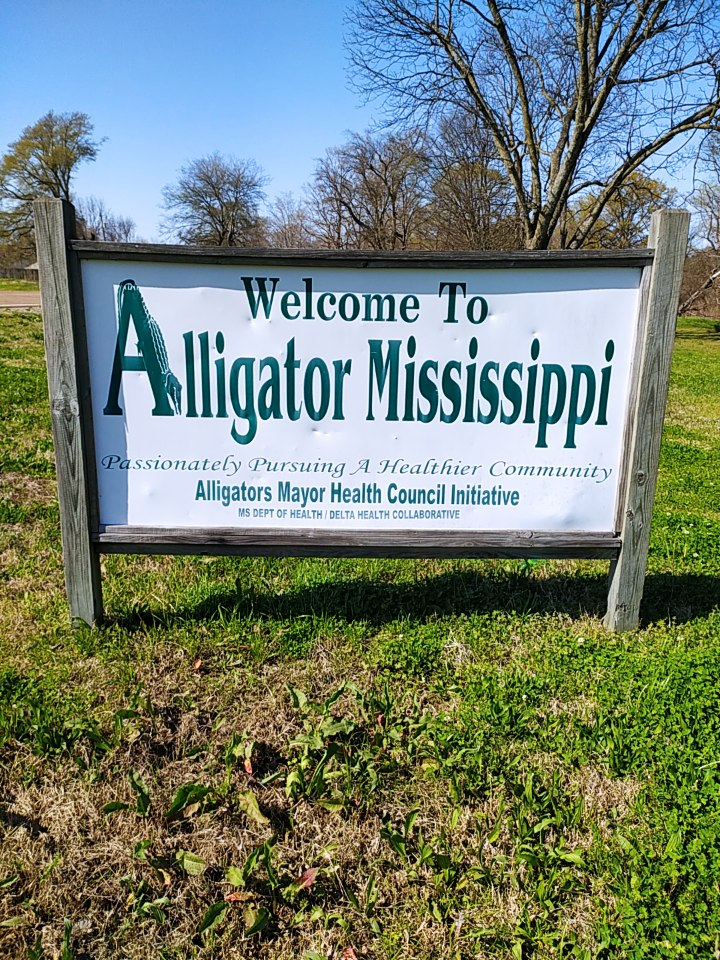
- Welcome sign in Alligator

- Location of Alligator, Mississippi

- Location in the United States
- Coordinates: 34°05′24″N 90°43′14″W
- Country: United States
- State: Mississippi
- County: Bolivar

Area
  - Total: 1.04 sq mi (2.70 km^{2})
  - Land: 0.98 sq mi (2.55 km^{2})
  - Water: 0.058 sq mi (0.15 km^{2})
- Elevation: 161 ft (49 m)

Population (2020)
  - Total: 116
  - Density: 117.8/sq mi (45.47/km^{2})
- Time zone: UTC-6 (Central (CST))
  - Summer (DST): UTC-5 (CDT)
- ZIP code: 38720
- Area code: 662
- FIPS code: 28-00940
- GNIS feature ID: 2405138

Alligator is a town in Bolivar County, Mississippi, United States. Per the 2020 Census, the population was 116.

In 2009, Tommie "Tomaso" Brown was elected Alligator's first black mayor. He defeated Robert Fava, the mayor since 1979.

== Etymology ==
The town takes its name from Alligator Lake, a lake in the town which once had a large alligator population.

== Geography ==
According to the United States Census Bureau, the town has a total area of 1.04 square miles (2.70 km^{2}), of which 0.98 square miles (2.55 km^{2}) is land and 0.058 square miles (0.15 km^{2}), or 5.48%, is water.

== Demographics ==
Historical population
Census	Pop.	Note	%±
1920	263		—
1930	278		5.7%
1940	206		−25.9%
1950	214		3.9%
1960	227		6.1%
1970	280		23.3%
1980	256		−8.6%
1990	187		−27.0%
2000	220		17.6%
2010	208		−5.5%
2020	116		−44.2%
U.S. Decennial Census; 2010 2020

=== Racial and ethnic composition ===
Alligator town, Mississippi – Racial and ethnic composition Note: the US Census treats Hispanic/Latino as an ethnic category. This table excludes Latinos from the racial categories and assigns them to a separate category. Hispanics/Latinos may be of any race.
Race / Ethnicity (NH = Non-Hispanic)	Pop 2000	Pop 2010	Pop 2020	% 2000	% 2010	% 2020
White alone (NH)	46	33	17	20.91%	15.87%	14.66%
Black or African American alone (NH)	170	171	95	77.27%	82.21%	81.90%
Native American or Alaska Native alone (NH)	0	0	0	0.00%	0.00%	0.00%
Asian alone (NH)	0	1	0	0.00%	0.48%	0.00%
Native Hawaiian or Pacific Islander alone (NH)	0	0	0	0.00%	0.00%	0.00%
Other race alone (NH)	0	0	0	0.00%	0.00%	0.00%
Mixed race or Multiracial (NH)	4	1	1	1.82%	0.48%	0.86%
Hispanic or Latino (any race)	0	2	3	0.00%	0.96%	2.59%
Total	220	208	116	100.00%	100.00%	100.00%

=== 2000 census ===
As of the census of 2000, there were 220 people, 77 households, and 58 families residing in the town. The population density was 223.7 inhabitants per square mile (86.4/km^{2}). There were 81 housing units at an average density of 82.3 per square mile (31.8/km^{2}). The racial makeup of the town was 20.91% White, 77.27% African American, and 1.82% from two or more races.

There were 77 households, out of which 39.0% had children under the age of 18 living with them, 35.1% were married couples living together, 35.1% had a female householder with no husband present, and 23.4% were non-families. 23.4% of all households were made up of individuals, and 10.4% had someone living alone who was 65 years of age or older. The average household size was 2.86 and the average family size was 3.27.

In the town, the population was spread out, with 39.1% under the age of 18, 4.5% from 18 to 24, 27.3% from 25 to 44, 16.8% from 45 to 64, and 12.3% who were 65 years of age or older. The median age was 29 years. For every 100 females, there were 83.3 males. For every 100 females age 18 and over, there were 74.0 males.

The median income for a household in the town was $16,667, and the median income for a family was $17,083. Males had a median income of $21,875 versus $14,063 for females. The per capita income for the town was $9,567. About 41.5% of families and 47.2% of the population were below the poverty line, including 69.3% of those under the age of eighteen and 35.3% of those sixty five or over.

== Education ==
Duncan is served by the North Bolivar Consolidated School District, formerly known as the North Bolivar School District until it consolidated in 2014.

Students are zoned to Brooks Elementary School in Duncan, as it belonged to the pre-consolidation North Bolivar School District, and Northside High School (the only secondary school in the district) in Shelby.

Northside High opened in 2018 after Broad Street High School in Shelby consolidated into it. Shelby Middle School closed in 2018.

== Notable people ==
- Charles Bennett, professional football player
- Tony Bennett, professional football player
- Jack Butler, author
- Fred Coe, television producer and director
- Johnny Drummer, Chicago blues and soul blues singer
- Matt Duff, former Major League Baseball pitcher

== Gallery ==
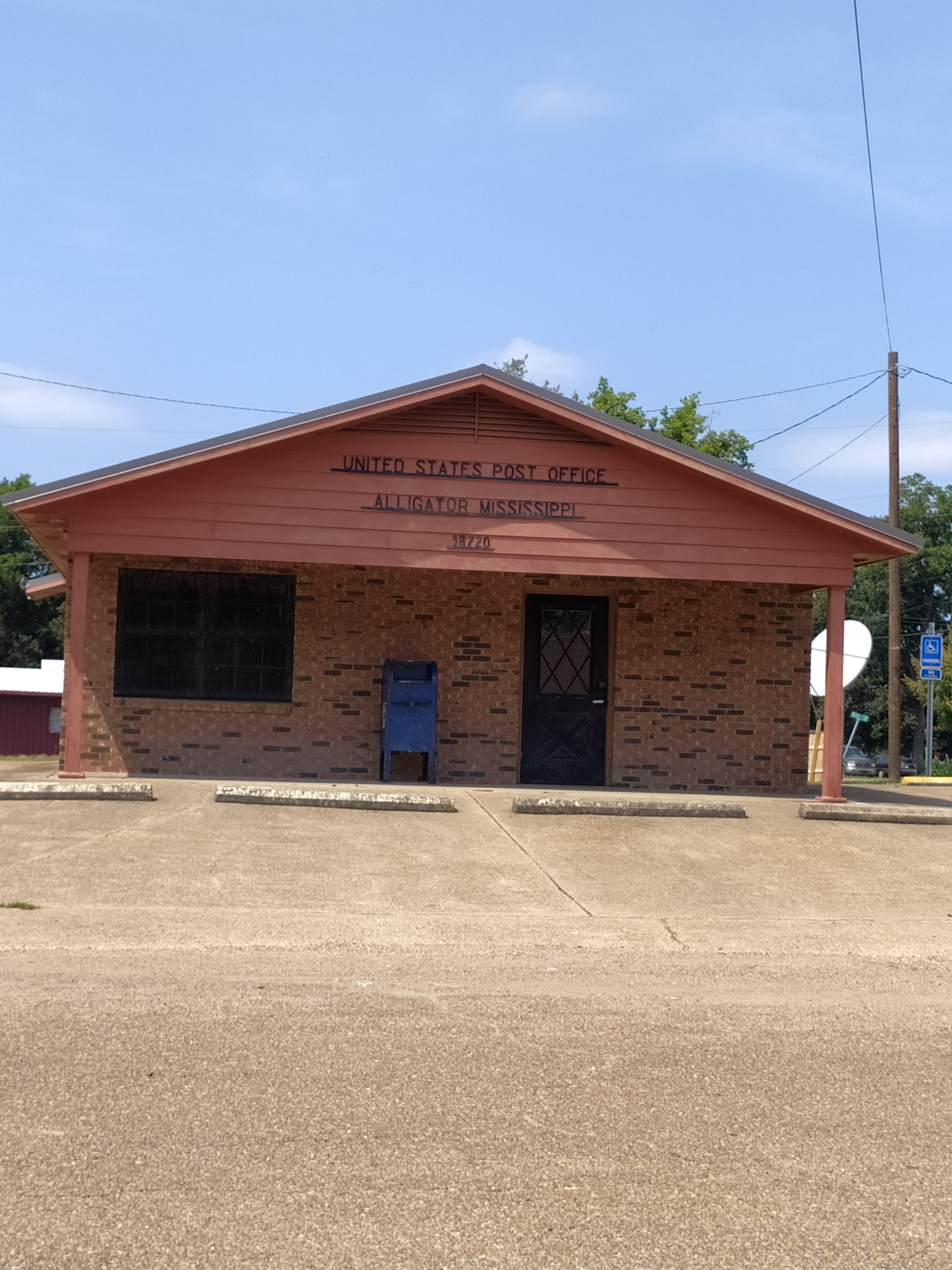
Post Office

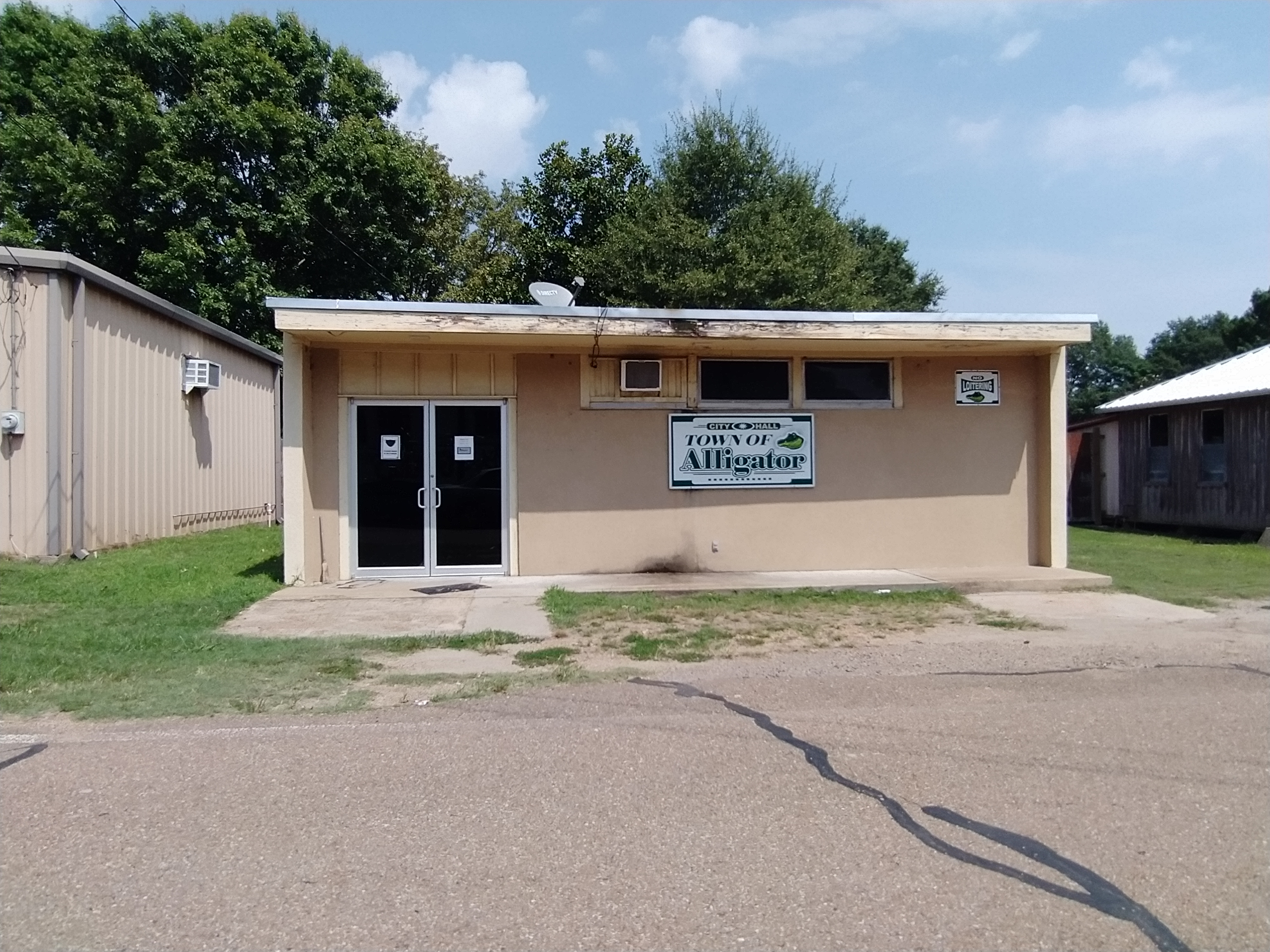
Town Hall

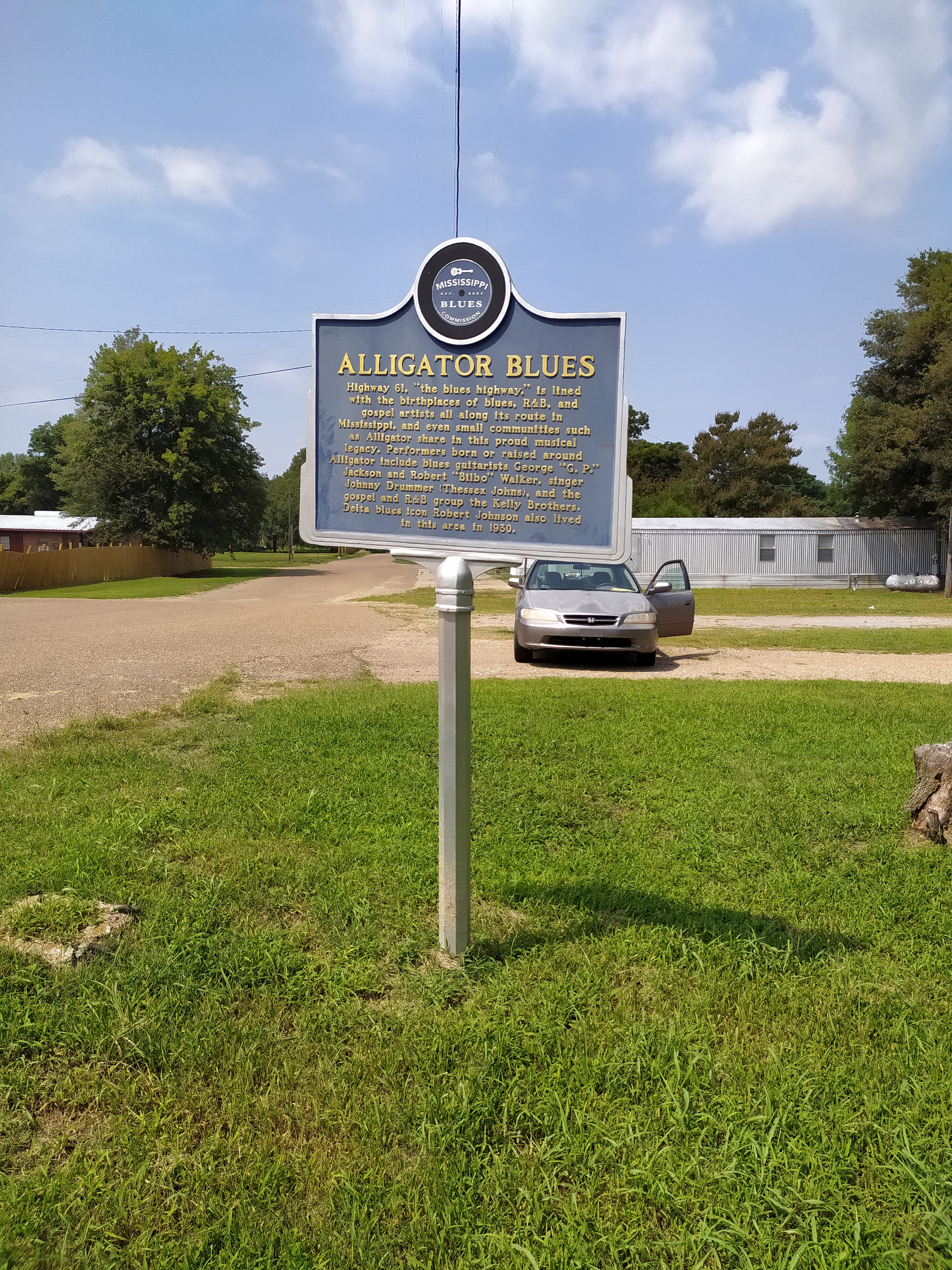
Mississippi Blues Trail marker in the downtown area
