= William Brooks Alexander =

William Brooks Alexander may refer to:

- W. B. Alexander Sr. (1894–1960), American attorney and Mississippi state senator
- William B. Alexander (1921–2006), American attorney and Mississippi state senator, his son
