= Walter B. Parks =

American politician

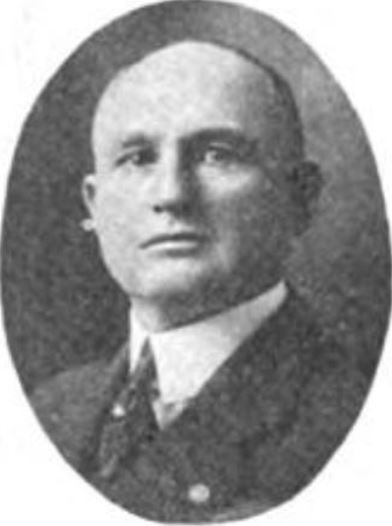
- c. 1917

Member of the Mississippi State Senate from the 30th district
- In office January 1916 – January 1920
- Preceded by: John C. Burrus
- Succeeded by: W. B. Roberts

Member of the Mississippi House of Representatives from the Bolivar County district
- In office January 1912 – January 1916
- Succeeded by: Walter Sillers Jr. Stanley F. Gaines

Personal details
- Born: August 27, 1868 Union County, Mississippi, U.S.
- Died: January 1930 (aged 61) Tunica County, Mississippi, U.S.
- Party: Democratic

Walter B. Parks (August 27, 1868 - January 1930) was an American politician. He was a member of the Mississippi State Senate from 1916 to 1920, and of the Mississippi House of Representatives from 1912 to 1916.

== Biography ==
Walter B. Parks was born on August 27, 1868, in Union County, Mississippi. He was the son of William Beaty Parks, a Confederate Army private in the U.S. Civil War, and his wife, Calista Virginia (Hudson) Parks. Parks attended the Pine Bluff School near Toccopola, Mississippi, and also attended Toccopola College, although he did not graduate. Parks started working in a store in Shelby, Mississippi, in 1890, and after leaving in 1894, opened his own store in Merigold, Mississippi, in 1895. He then entered the banking industry, becoming the director and president of several banks, and he also owned plantations and livestock farms.

== Political career ==
Parks was Merigold's Town Treasurer from 1904 to 1908, and he was also the town's Postmaster from 1905 to 1909. In November 1911, he was elected to represent Bolivar County as a Democrat in the Mississippi House of Representatives, and served in the term from 1912 to 1916. In November 1915, Parks was elected to represent the 30th District in the Mississippi State Senate, and served from 1916 to 1920. During this term, Parks was the chairman of the Senate's Levee Committee. During his time in office, Parks authored and supported bills improving highway and drainage systems.

== Later life ==
Parks died suddenly in January 1930, near Tunica, Mississippi.
