= Winstonville, Mississippi =

- Town
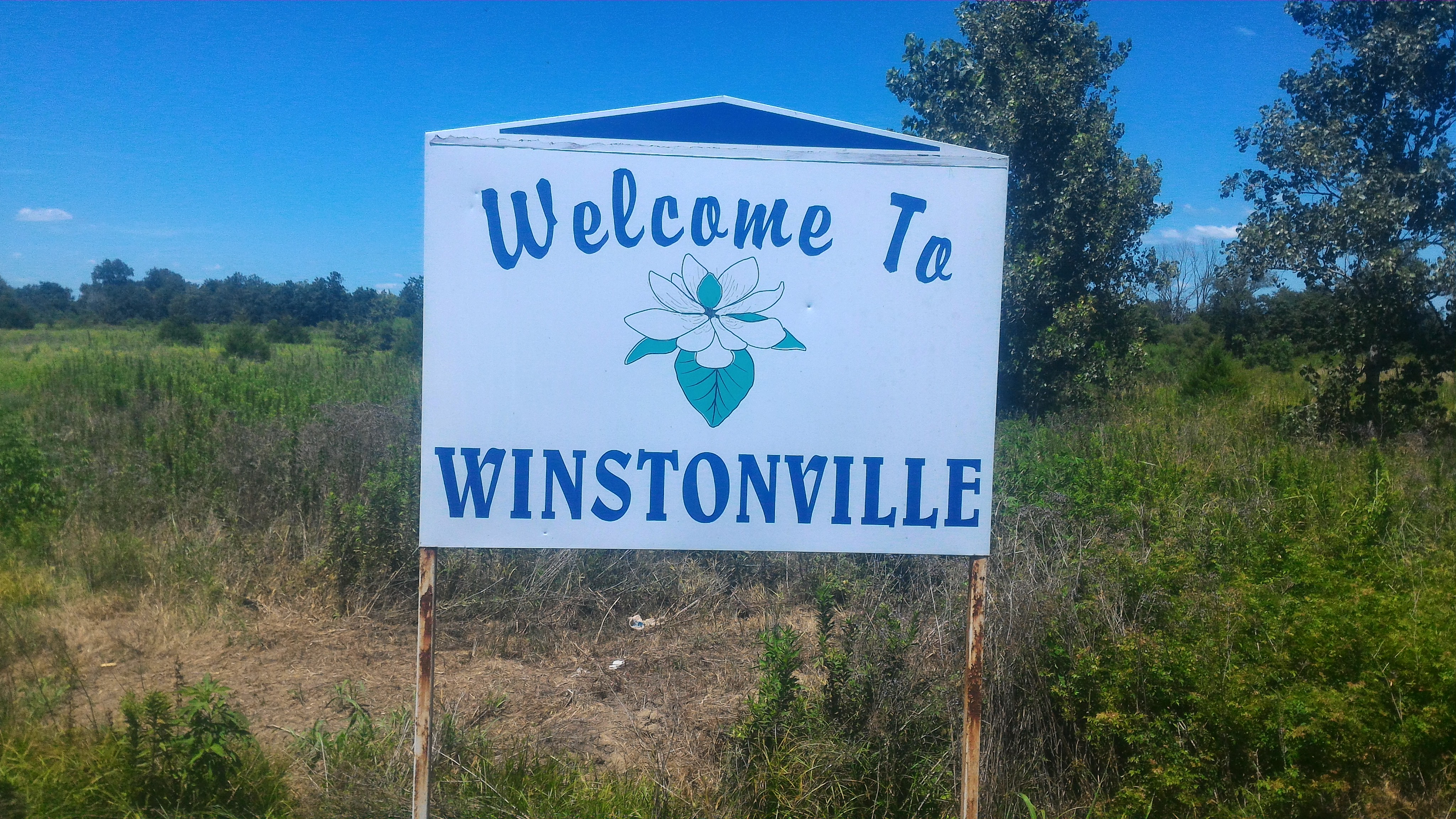
- Welcome sign in Winstonville
- Motto: "A Town on the Move"
- Location of Winstonville, Mississippi

- Location in the United States
- Coordinates: 33°54′47″N 90°45′02″W
- Country: United States
- State: Mississippi
- County: Bolivar

Area
  - Total: 0.29 sq mi (0.76 km^{2})
  - Land: 0.29 sq mi (0.76 km^{2})
  - Water: 0 sq mi (0.00 km^{2})
- Elevation: 144 ft (44 m)

Population (2020)
  - Total: 153
  - Density: 518.4/sq mi (200.15/km^{2})
- Time zone: UTC-6 (Central (CST))
  - Summer (DST): UTC-5 (CDT)
- ZIP code: 38781
- Area code: 662
- FIPS code: 28-80800
- GNIS feature ID: 2406904
- Website: www.townofwinstonville.com

Winstonville is a town in Bolivar County, Mississippi, United States. Per the 2020 census, the population was 153.

== Geography ==
According to the United States Census Bureau, the town has a total area of 0.29 square miles (0.76 km^{2}), all land.

== Demographics ==
Historical population
Census	Pop.	Note	%±
1930	142		—
1940	169		19.0%
1950	322		90.5%
1960	327		1.6%
1970	536		63.9%
1980	486		−9.3%
1990	277		−43.0%
2000	319		15.2%
2010	191		−40.1%
2020	153		−19.9%
U.S. Decennial Census; 2010 2020

=== Racial and ethnic composition ===
Winstonville town, Mississippi – Racial and ethnic composition Note: the US Census treats Hispanic/Latino as an ethnic category. This table excludes Latinos from the racial categories and assigns them to a separate category. Hispanics/Latinos may be of any race.
Race / Ethnicity (NH = Non-Hispanic)	Pop 2000	Pop 2010	Pop 2020	% 2000	% 2010	% 2020
White alone (NH)	6	1	0	1.88%	0.52%	0.00%
Black or African American alone (NH)	312	190	150	97.81%	99.48%	98.04%
Native American or Alaska Native alone (NH)	0	0	0	0.00%	0.00%	0.00%
Asian alone (NH)	0	0	1	0.00%	0.00%	0.65%
Native Hawaiian or Pacific Islander alone (NH)	0	0	0	0.00%	0.00%	0.00%
Other race alone (NH)	0	0	1	0.00%	0.00%	0.65%
Mixed race or Multiracial (NH)	0	0	1	0.00%	0.00%	0.65%
Hispanic or Latino (any race)	1	0	0	0.31%	0.00%	0.00%
Total	319	191	153	100.00%	100.00%	100.00%

=== 2000 Census ===
As of the census of 2000, there were 319 people, 116 households, and 77 families residing in the town. The population density was 1,097.1 inhabitants per square mile (423.6/km^{2}). There were 120 housing units at an average density of 412.7 per square mile (159.3/km^{2}). The racial makeup of the town was 1.88% White, 97.81% African American, 0.31% from other races. Hispanic or Latino of any race were 0.31% of the population.

There were 116 households, out of which 26.7% had children under the age of 18 living with them, 28.4% were married couples living together, 27.6% had a female householder with no husband present, and 33.6% were non-families. 31.9% of all households were made up of individuals, and 15.5% had someone living alone who was 65 years of age or older. The average household size was 2.64 and the average family size was 3.32.

In the town, the population was spread out, with 25.7% under the age of 18, 12.2% from 18 to 24, 24.8% from 25 to 44, 21.3% from 45 to 64, and 16.0% who were 65 years of age or older. The median age was 34 years. For every 100 females, there were 103.2 males. For every 100 females age 18 and over, there were 99.2 males.

The median income for a household in the town was $11,125, and the median income for a family was $17,000. Males had a median income of $17,917 versus $11,875 for females. The per capita income for the town was $6,269. About 42.7% of families and 45.6% of the population were below the poverty line, including 44.6% of those under age 18 and 55.9% of those age 65 or over.

== Education ==
Today the city of Mound Bayou is served by the North Bolivar Consolidated School District, which operates I.T. Montgomery Elementary School in Mound Bayou and Northside High School in Shelby.

It was previously in the Mound Bayou Public School District. On July 1, 2014, the North Bolivar School District consolidated with the Mound Bayou Public School District to form the North Bolivar Consolidated School District. The central office for this consolidated district is located in Mound Bayou. John F. Kennedy Memorial High School in Mound Bayou, formerly the secondary school of the Mound Bayou district, closed in 2018.

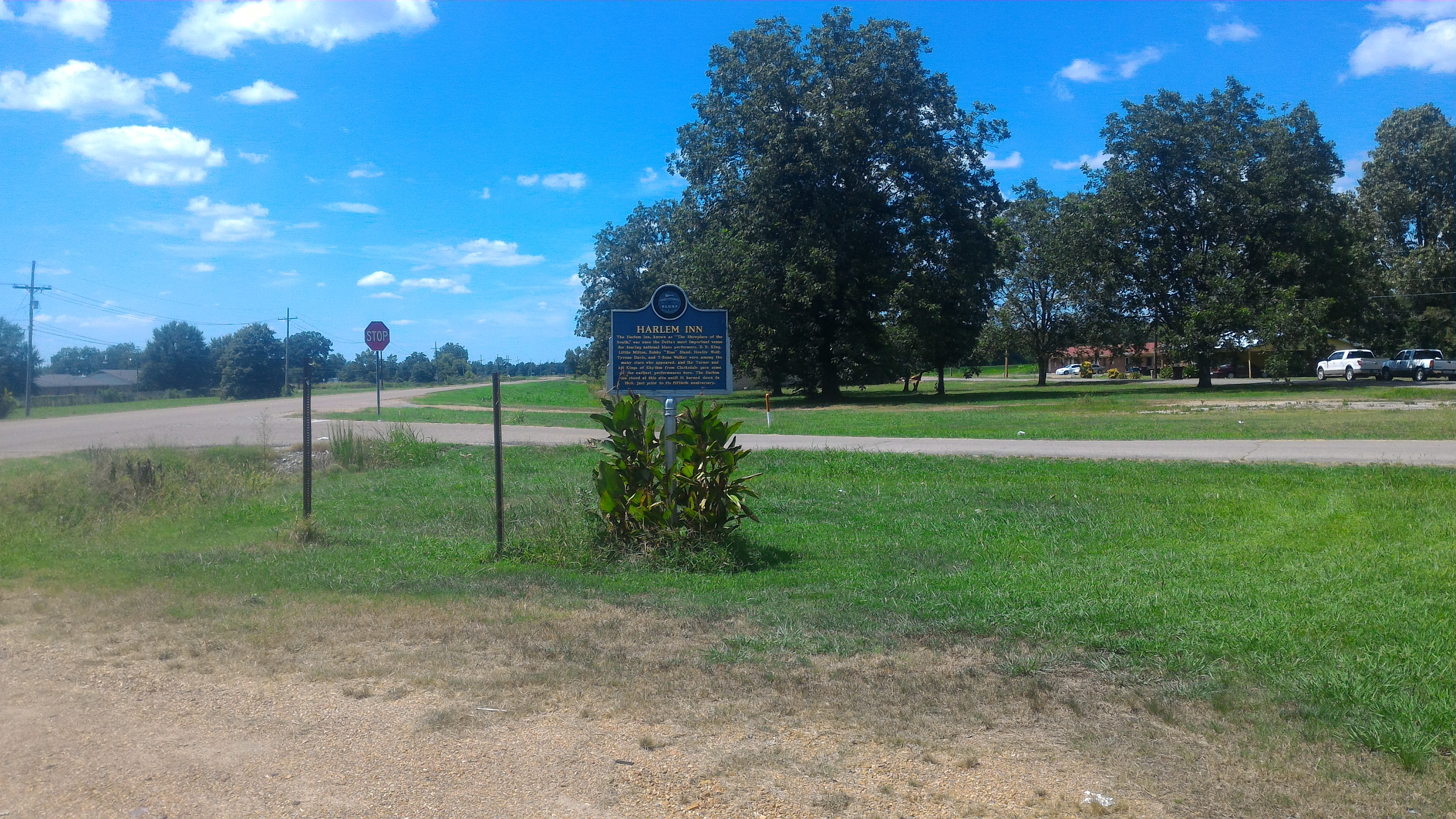
Harlem Inn Mississippi Blues Trail marker
