= Mississippi Slim =

Mississippi Slim could refer to:

- Mississippi Slim (blues musician), Walter Horn Jr. (1943 - 2010)
- Mississippi Slim (country singer), Carvel Lee Ausborn (1923 - 1973)
