= Oscar O. Wolfe Jr. =

American politician

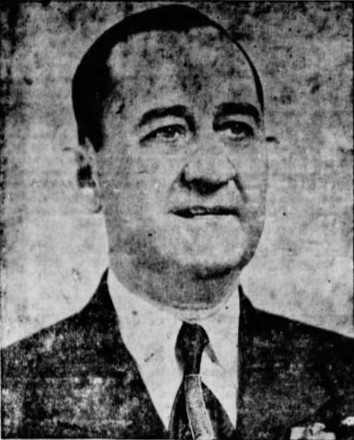
- c. 1950

President pro tempore of the Mississippi State Senate
- In office 1941 – January 1952
- Preceded by: W. B. Roberts
- Succeeded by: J. O. Clark

Member of the Mississippi State Senate from the 30th district
- In office 1941 – January 1952
- Preceded by: W. B. Roberts
- Succeeded by: W. B. Alexander Sr.

Member of the Mississippi House of Representatives from the Bolivar County district
- In office January 1932 – 1941

Personal details
- Born: January 10, 1890 Terry, Mississippi, U.S.
- Died: January 30, 1978 (aged 88) Duncan, Mississippi, U.S.
- Party: Democratic

Oscar Orlando Wolfe Jr. (December 10, 1890 - January 30, 1978) was an American farmer and Democratic Party state legislator in Mississippi. He served in the Mississippi House of Representatives and Mississippi Senate including a stint as president pro tempore. He lived in Duncan, Bolivar County, Mississippi.

== Early life and career ==
Born in Terry, Mississippi, on December 10, 1890, Wolfe attended Mississippi A & M College and Soule Business College. After graduating, he moved to Beulah, Mississippi, where he briefly lived before moving to Duncan, Mississippi, in 1910. He began farming in 1912. He held several government positions in Duncan, including justice of the peace, town alderman and mayor. He represented Bolivar County in the Mississippi House of Representatives from 1932 to 1941 when he succeeded W. B. Roberts, who died, in the Mississippi State Senate. He then represented the 30th District in the Mississippi State Senate from 1942 to 1952, and was its president pro tempore from 1944 to 1948. Frank E. Smith defeated him in 1948 in a campaign for a seat in the U.S. Congress.

In 1950, Wolfe again unsuccessfully ran for Congress against Smith.

In 1961, he gave a statement on the challenges of farming in Mississippi and made recommendations for aiding farmers.

=== Political views ===
He was a supporter of state superintendent of prisons Marvin E. Wiggins Sr.

In 1950, Wolfe gave a speech supporting the execution of Willie McGee, labelling the Civil Rights Congress a "Communistic bunch" and a "subversive gang", also saying that, "it is a pity that the states of this country do not have the laws to place this bunch behind bars when they come into our states and try to tell us how we should run our own affairs."

== Personal life and death ==
He married Eva Jeffrey in 1913, and they were married until her death in 1930. He married Elizabeth Jackson in 1938, and they were married until his death. Wolfe died of an apparent heart attack on January 30, 1978, at his home in Duncan, Mississippi. He was survived by one son and three daughters.
