= Earl Evans =

Earl Evans may refer to:

- Earl Evans (American football) (1900–1991), American football player
- Earl Evans (scientist) (1910–1999), chairman of the biochemistry department at the University of Chicago
- Earl Evans (basketball) (1955–2012), American basketball player
- Earl Evans Jr., politician in Mississippi
