= W. B. Roberts =

American lawyer (1861–1940)

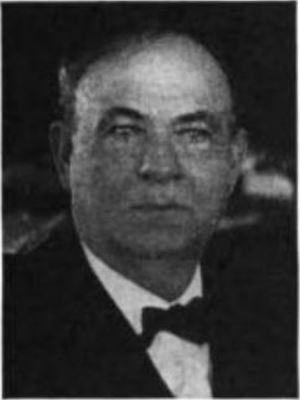
- c. 1924

President pro tempore of the Mississippi State Senate
- In office January 1940 – October 3, 1940
- Preceded by: John Culkin
- Succeeded by: Oscar O. Wolfe Jr.
- In office September 29, 1931 – January 1932
- Preceded by: Homer H. Casteel
- Succeeded by: W. C. Adams

Member of the Mississippi State Senate from the 30th district
- In office January 1920 – October 3, 1940
- Preceded by: Walter B. Parks
- Succeeded by: Oscar O. Wolfe Jr.

Personal details
- Born: William Beauregard Roberts; March 5, 1861 Louisville, Kentucky, U.S.
- Died: October 3, 1940 (aged 79) Rosedale, Mississippi, U.S.
- Party: Democratic
- Spouse: Minnie Elizabeth Poole (m. 1886; died 1937)
- Children: 5
- Relatives: Walter Sillers Jr. (son-in-law)
- Education: Vanderbilt University

William Beauregard Roberts (March 5, 1861 - October 3, 1940) was an American Democratic politician, lawyer, planter, and banker. A resident of Rosedale, Mississippi, he represented Bolivar County in the Mississippi State Senate for six consecutive terms, from 1920 to his death in 1940. He was the Senate's President Pro Tempore for two stints in 1931 and 1940 and also served as the Acting Governor of Mississippi in December 1931.

== Early life ==
William Beauregard Roberts was born on March 5, 1861, in Louisville, Kentucky. (Note: Most sources say he was born in Louisville, but his obituary gives his place of birth as neighboring Jeffersonville, Indiana.) He was the son of Clay Roberts (died 1880), a former Tennessee state senator from Nashville who was of English descent, and his wife, Mattie Louis (Cable) Roberts. Roberts attended an "old time boys school" known as the A. L. Minines or Mimms Academy near Nashville. During his youth, Roberts served as a page in the Tennessee legislature. In 1879, he took a law course at Vanderbilt University. Although the 18-year-old Roberts did all the work necessary for a law degree, he did not receive a diploma due to being too young. He was then admitted to the bar, and after his father's death in 1880, Roberts taught school and practiced law in Hardin County, Kentucky.

== Career ==
=== 1880–1919 ===
Roberts became a lawyer, a banker, and a planter. He moved to Bolivar, Mississippi, arriving by a steamboat that landed there on February 11, 1882. In 1886, he married Minnie Poole. The family then moved to Rosedale, Mississippi, in 1890. He served as the Democratic Chairman of the Bolivar County Executive Committee and participated in the "final restoration of political authority to the whites" there following the end of Reconstruction. In 1890, he served a member of the Mississippi Levee Board. He organized the Valley Bank of Rosedale in 1898. He served as its president from the bank's founding until his retirement in 1929, and was a member of the bank's board until his death. He claimed to have brought the first automobile to Mississippi in 1902 and supported improving roads in the state, serving as a Road Commissioner, and suggested constructing hard-surfaced roads. He also built the first gravel road in Bolivar County.

=== 1919–1923 ===
In 1919, Roberts ran for the office of Mississippi State Senator to represent the 30th District (composed of Bolivar County) in the 1920 and 1922 sessions. During the Democratic primary, Roberts defeated three opponents by such an amount that a runoff was almost not needed. During the runoff election on August 26, Roberts defeated his opponent, Dr. E. E. Shivers, by "a large majority". In November, Roberts won the general election. During the 1920–1924 term, he was a member of the Senate's Judiciary; Fees and Salaries; Immigration; Insurance; Roads, Ferries, and Bridges; and Levee's committees. He quickly rose as a debate leader in the Senate and was known to oppose excessive government spending, but still support improvement of roads and other public works.

=== 1923–1927 ===
In June 1923, Roberts withdrew his candidacy for the Senate for re-election, in spite of the fact that he faced no opposition in the primary. He won the primary and got elected for the 1924–1928 term. In 1924, Roberts and fellow State Senator Arthur Marshall proposed to donate buildings in Cleveland, Mississippi, formerly belonging to Bolivar County Agricultural College to establish Delta State Teachers' College; the bill was signed on April 9 by Governor Henry Whitfield.

=== 1927–1931 ===
Roberts was re-elected and served again in the Senate in the 1928–1932 term. During this term, Roberts was the chairman of the Senate's Finance "B" Committee. He was also a member of the Senate's Insurance, Judiciary "B", and Levees Committees.

==== Treasury deficit issue ====
In April 1931, as the state treasury reached a five-million-dollar deficit due to effects of the Great Depression, State House Speaker Thomas L. Bailey called for an informal conference of House members to make up the budget, as only the state legislature had the authority to "relieve the deplorable state of the public legislature". However, Governor T. G. Bilbo stated that he would not be able to call it a legislative session (needed to pass bills) unless a substantial majority of the legislature would sign pledges supporting a short and-investigation free session. The Senate President, Lieutenant Governor Bidwell Adam, did not join Speaker Bailey in calling for the legislative conference. Roberts, as the chair of the Senate's Finance Committee, spoke out in support of restoring the treasury and sent every Senator a letter calling for them to go to the conference. In his letter, which was also published by the Associated Press, Roberts also provided a suggestion for Treasury-restoring legislation for the session: a bill authorizing the state bond commission to sell $5 million worth of 20-year bonds, $2 million worth of short-term notes maturing on May 1, 1932, and a second bill appropriating $10,000 for the session's expenses. In addition, Roberts wanted Bilbo to sign a pledge that the session would only involve the restoration of the treasury; this was to prevent Governor Bilbo, who had tried for the previous four sessions to get his own suggested bills passed (for example, a state printing plant bill, a penal farm bill, and a board of charities bill), for having another opportunity to get the bills voted on, as Roberts and other "anti-administration" legislators did not like this expansion of federal power.

On April 28, the Senate and House each met in their respective chambers, with 26 out of 49 Senators and 81 out of 140 House members attending. Although a majority of members of each branch of the legislature attended, it was unknown whether it met Bilbo's unspecified request for a "substantial majority". During the Senate meeting, Roberts served as the Senate leader. After preliminary events, the Senate and House then participated in a joint conference chaired by Roberts. Then, the conference adopted a resolution by Roberts' son-in-law, House member Walter Sillers Jr., to create a joint committee that would draft resolutions. This resolution committee was chaired by Roberts and included Senators John W. Kyle and Luther Latham, House Speaker Thomas L. Bailey, House Ways & Means Chairman Joe George, House Governor's Floor Leader John A. Yeager, and House Member Leon Hendricks. At 1:30 PM, this committee adjourned with a resolution meeting Bilbo's demands.

However, Governor Bilbo, who had remained in his Southern Mississippi pecan orchard, rejected the resolution due to the fact that the legislators did not individually sign the pledge. He called the legislators' meeting a "fool session" and accused them of trying to wreck his administration. In response, Roberts said that, by forcing them to make the pledge in order to meet, Bilbo was forcing the legislators to waive several of the legislators' constitutional rights, while Bilbo waived nothing.

==== September 1931 session ====
Bilbo reconvened the legislature on September 29, 1931, saying that he had needed to wait for political disagreements to cool down. As the Senate's previous President Pro Tempore, Homer H. Casteel, had been recently appointed by Bilbo to the state tax commission, a new President Pro Tempore needed to be selected. Senator W. C. Adams nominated Roberts for the position, and after a motion by Senator Henry A. Minor, Roberts unanimously won the position by acclamation. During the session, Roberts authored three bills: a bill (jointly authored by Roberts and his son-in-law Sillers) that would (for the following two years) reduce cotton farming acreage by 30 percent to limit overproduction, a second bill that would reduce taxes by 40% in the Mississippi Delta and 25% in the rest of Mississippi, and a third bill that would grant the government the ability to issue $7.5 million in short-term notes in order to make up for the budget deficit. Roberts' cotton bill, mirroring the cotton reduction plan of Texas, was passed over the objections of legislators like House member L. T. Kennedy and Senator Ed Smith. Both legislators supported Louisiana's cotton reduction plan. Senator Smith also argued that the cotton surplus in the Delta was already very low, and that the proposed farmland curtailments would greatly cut the number of farming families with 1000 acres and put thousands of black farm laborers out of work in each county. Regardless, on October 2, Roberts' bill passed in the Senate with a 39–7 vote. Also on the same day, Roberts introduced his budget deficit bill, and it was passed unanimously by the Senate, although not before it had been amended by Senator Luther Whittington to only issue $6 million instead of $7.5 million. On October 16, after minor amendments by the House, Roberts' cotton limitation bill was signed by Governor Bilbo. The finance bond budget-deficit bill was passed by the Senate on October 21 with a 30–1 vote. On October 28, Roberts joined in a filibuster against a proposed bill, already approved by the House, that would limit salaries.

In late October, Bilbo and Adam agreed to leave Mississippi simultaneously at some point between then and January 1 in order to give Roberts the opportunity to be the acting governor of Mississippi for a short time ending before the end of Bilbo's term as governor.

==== Acting governor ====
On December 21, 1931, Governor Bilbo and Lieutenant Governor Adam left Mississippi to go on a hunting trip for the Christmas holidays, as part of the previously made deal to briefly make Roberts acting governor. On December 22, for his first act as acting governor, Roberts issued a proclamation calling for fellow states in the American South to hold special legislative sessions to pass laws restricting cotton farming in order to limit cotton overproduction. The following day, Roberts telegraphed Georgia Governor Richard Russell Jr. in order to personally request Russell to enact laws limiting cotton production, telling the governor "Upon your shoulders rests the issue of early prosperity or worse conditions". Also on December 23, Roberts issued his first pardon in his time as acting governor, for an 84 or 87-year-old black man named Calvin Butler who had for 3 months been working on a prison farm in order to pay off a $100 liquor possession fine.

=== 1931–1935 ===
After either receiving no opposition or winning the first Democratic primary, Roberts served again in the Senate in the 1932–1936 term. During the 1932 session, Roberts opposed ad valorem taxes and, citing declining property values, instead supported a complete overhaul of the tax system, including reducing the sales tax to 3% for all sales. This proposition was opposed by Senator Luther Whittington and other legislators, who accused Roberts of wanting to deprive the state treasury of its main source of income. Other senators, including Luther Gregory, accused Roberts of being too eager to compromise and creating an unworkable solution. In 1934, the State Senate gave Roberts a golden wristwatch in recognition of his service.

=== 1935–1939 ===
Roberts was re-elected in 1935 and served in the 1936–1940 term. During this term, Roberts was the chairman of the Senate's Finance Committee and also served on other committees including Judiciary; Banks and Banking; Levees; and Rules. In April 1938, the Senate paid tribute to Roberts as its longest-tenured member and gave him a "loving cup".

=== 1939–1941 ===
Roberts was re-elected again for the 1940–1944 term, his sixth consecutive term. During this term, Roberts was nominated for and elected to the position of the Senate's president pro tempore. In the Senate, Roberts served as the chairman of the Banks & Banking Committee, the Vice Chairman of the Contingent Expenses Committee, the Vice Chairman of the Finance Committee, and as a member of the Drainage Committee, the Judiciary Committee, the Levees Committee, and the State Library Committee.

==== Textbook Discrimination Amendment ====
During the 1940 session, Governor Paul Johnson introduced a bill to allow for free textbooks for public school students in grades 1–8. One amendment was created in the bill that would separately store textbooks for black students "to protect the health of white pupils". Roberts led support in favor of the discriminatory amendment, arguing that "in Mississippi the race issue is still paramount" and that "There is no question of the right of this Legislature in order to separate the negro and the white man", citing the racially discriminatory 1890 state constitution as well as the Supreme Court's decision in Plessy v. Ferguson. These amendments were opposed by members of the legislature's education committee, who pointed out that the provisions for racial discrimination would "weaken the bill's constitutionality" and allow the ACLU to make a legal case against them, and that the "red-blooded Mississippians and sons of Confederate soldiers" managing textbook distribution would ultimately segregate textbook storage anyway without the specifications in the amendment. Ultimately, the amendment failed with a 18–22 vote in the Senate.

==== 79th birthday ====
A second session was called in March 1940. On March 5, 1940, Roberts was at home in Rosedale celebrating his 79th birthday, and the senate adopted resolutions honoring Roberts. The resolutions noted that at 79, Roberts was the oldest member of the legislature, and that Roberts was also its longest continuously serving member.

== Personal life ==
Roberts was a member of the Christian Church. He belonged to the Odd Fellows, the Freemasons, and the Knights of Pythias. Despite his advanced age as a senator, Roberts was known for being up-to-date with modern technology, bringing the first car to Mississippi in 1902 and owning the first radio in Rosedale. As a senator, he was also known for being active despite his advanced age, as he still drove a car until days before his death at 79.

Roberts married Minnie Elizabeth Poole (born 1868) on February 6, 1886, in Memphis, Tennessee; this marriage would last until Minnie's death in 1937. Between 1886 and 1890 they had two children: Emma Louise Roberts (died 1950), who married Frank R. Reid (died 1928) in 1906 and in 1930 remarried to James Alcorn Swift (1890–1957), the grandson of Mississippi Governor James Alcorn; and Zoe Roberts (1889–1981), who married Dr. Leon B. Austin (died 1953) in 1911. After 1890, they had three more children: Lena Cable Roberts (1891–1983), who married Walter Sillers Jr. in 1911; William B. Roberts Jr., who died in infancy; and William Clay Roberts (1904–1962), who became a lawyer, member of his father's law firm, county supervisor, and president of the Bolivar County bar association.

=== Death ===
Roberts died after a brief illness at his home in Rosedale, Mississippi, at 4 AM on October 3, 1940. He was 79 years old and the Senate's incumbent president pro tempore. A funeral service was held on October 4, and Roberts was interred at Rosedale Cemetery. He was survived by his son and three daughters.
