= Deadly Nightshade =

Deadly Nightshade may refer to:

- Deadly nightshade (Atropa bella-donna), a poisonous perennial herbaceous plant in the nightshade family
- Deadly Nightshade (comics), a Marvel Comics character
- Deadly Nightshade (film), a 1953 British crime drama film
- The Deadly Nightshade, an American rock and country band
- "Deadly Nightshade", a song by the Sword from the album Used Future
- Deadly Nightshade, a song by Blackbriar (band) from the EP Fractured Fairytales (2017)

== See also ==
- Nightshade (disambiguation)
