= Choker Campbell =

American saxophonist

- Born: Walter Luzar Campbell; March 21, 1916; Shelby, Mississippi, US
- Origin: Saginaw, Michigan
- Died: July 20, 1993 (aged 77) Detroit, Michigan, US
- Genres: Soul, rhythm and blues, rock, jazz
- Occupations: Saxophonist, flautist, singer
- Instruments: Saxophone, flute, vocals
- Years active: 1935–1993
- Labels: Motown, Attic, Candy Apple, Campbell Artist Productions
- Formerly of: Choker Campbell and his Sixteen-Piece Orchestra, The Super Sounds

Walter Luzar "Choker" Campbell (March 21, 1916 – July 20, 1993) was an American saxophonist and bandleader.

== Biography ==
Born as an only child in Shelby, Mississippi, United States, his family moved to Saginaw, Michigan, when he was only five years old. Campbell studied saxophone under several musicians and left school at the age of nineteen.

In the early 1960s, he got a job at Hitsville USA (which later became Motown) playing with the resident band, and then leading one of the road bands that supported the artists on tour. His band backed many well-known Motown artists, such as The Supremes, The Temptations, Marvin Gaye, the Four Tops, Stevie Wonder and others. Campbell toured the US with stops at the Apollo Theater in New York City and many other venues, before his role as bandleader was taken by Earl Van Dyke. He also appeared in the film Shake, Rattle & Rock!, with Big Joe Turner and Mike Connors. He made a cameo in the TV series, Mannix, with Mike Connors in the 1960s.

After leaving Motown, Campbell continued to lead his own band in Detroit; traveling to Canada with his band and playing several Canadian venues. He settled in Toronto, Ontario, Canada, where he established the Tri-City Recording Company, started his own record label, Campbell Artist Productions, and did several recordings with Attic Records and Candy Apple (both of Toronto). He also did studio work with his friend, Paul Zaza. He wrote "Mother Nature" during this time, which was sampled by producer Kanye West for Common's track "Be (Intro)."

After several years, Campbell returned to Detroit, Michigan, where he remained until his death in July 1993, aged 77.
