= John F. Kennedy Memorial High School (Mississippi) =

Location
- 204 North Edwards Avenue; Mound Bayou, Mississippi 38762; United States
- Coordinates: 33°52′53″N 90°43′36″W

Information
- Type: Public high school
- School district: North Bolivar Consolidated School District (2014-2018); Mound Bayou Public School District (-2014)
- Grades: 7–12
- Enrollment: 232 (2016–17)
- Color
- Team name: Hornets
- Website: John F. Kennedy Memorial High School

John F. Kennedy Memorial High School was a public secondary school in Mound Bayou, Mississippi, United States, serving grades 7–12. At the end of its life it was in the North Bolivar Consolidated School District, and was formerly in the Mound Bayou Public School District.

Located at 204 Edwards Street, the school served students in grades seven through twelve from Mound Bayou, Winstonville, and surrounding areas.

The school's mascot was the Hornet.

== History ==
On July 1, 2014, the North Bolivar School District consolidated with the Mound Bayou Public School District to form the North Bolivar Consolidated School District.

=== Closure ===
In January 2018 the school district's board voted 3–2 to close Kennedy High. Even though Kennedy High had lower maintenance costs than Broad Street High School, meaning a renovation of Kennedy, compared to the other school, would cost $1 million fewer, the board kept the Broad Street campus opened as it had more space. As three of the five board members of the consolidated district were from the former Shelby-based North Bolivar school district, the representatives of that district had full control of the entire district. Kelsey Davis Betz of Mississippi Today wrote "If the high school closes, some fear the town’s sense of identity and remaining vitality will be weakened."

In March of that year residents began to consider legal action to force the state to keep Kennedy HS open. That month residents filed an injunction to a judge asking for the closure to be stopped. A judge in July temporarily ruled that the school should be kept in operation. However JFK HS closed August 2018 after the Mississippi Supreme Court confirmed the closure. The court ruling was two days before the start of classes. It was consolidated into Northside High School, on the campus of the former Broad Street High.

== Demographics ==
There were a total of 321 students enrolled in John F. Kennedy Memorial High during the 2006–2007 school year. The gender makeup of the school was 52% female and 48% male. The racial makeup of the school was 100.00% African American.

At the time of closure the enrollment was about 250.

== Curriculum ==
The teachers taught about the history of Mound Bayou, which was co-founded by free African Americans.

== Performance ==
For the 2017–2018 school year its graduation rate was 82.5%.

== See also ==
- List of high schools in Mississippi
- List of school districts in Mississippi
