= Jack Butler (author) =

American writer

- Born: 1944 (age 81–82); Alligator, Mississippi, U.S.
- Education: Central Missouri State College (BA, BS); University of Arkansas (MFA)
- Occupation: Writer
- Writing career
- Notable work: Nightshade (1989)

Jack Butler (born 1944 in Alligator, Mississippi) is an American writer.

== Education ==
From 1964 to 1966, Butler attended Central Missouri State College, earning an English B.A. and a Math B.S. From there, he attended the University of Arkansas and earned an M.F.A. in Creative Writing.

== Career ==
During the 1980s, Butler wrote his first five books: West of Hollywood (1980), Hawk Gumbo and Other Stories (1982), The Kid Who Wanted to Be a Spaceman (1984), Jujitsu for Christ (1986), and Nightshade (1989). In 1993, Living in Little Rock With Miss Little Rock was published.

In 1988, Butler became assistant dean of Hendrix College and, in 1993, he became Director of Creative Writing at the College of Santa Fe (now Santa Fe University of Art and Design), from which he retired in 2004. While at the College of Santa Fe, he published two more books: Jack’s Skillet: Plain Talk and Some Recipes From a Guy in the Kitchen (1997, a cookbook) and Dreamer (1999). Publishers Weekly said Dreamer "...reads like a dream, in fact, intensely vivid, brimming with portent, serendipity and meaning. But it's as discursive and confusing as a dream, subordinating classic thriller elements to a semi-associational flow of events."

Since his retirement as a teacher, Butler has published a fifth novel, Practicing Zen without a License, and a young adult sci-fi novel, Christmas on a Distant Planet. He has developed a mathematical theorem that declares the well-known Fibonnaci sequence is only one of a n infinity of possible Fibbonaci sequences, and that these sequences in turn are only one of an infinity of Fibonacci-like sequences he refers to as "parafibs." He continues to paint and to write and publish poetry, fiction, and essays.
