= Broad Street High School =

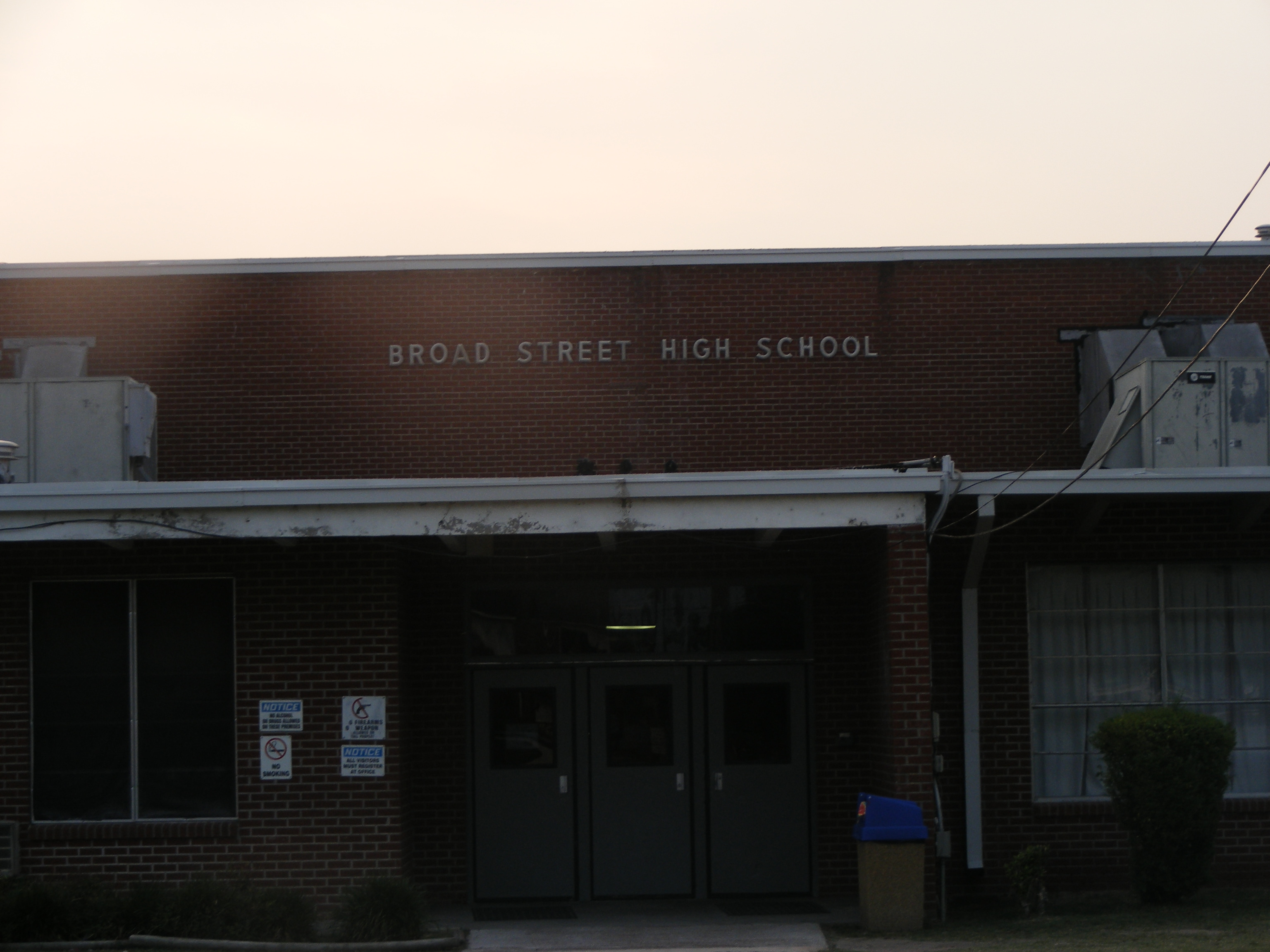

Location
- 1305 Martin Luther King, Jr. Boulevard; Shelby, Bolivar County, Mississippi 38774; United States
- Coordinates: 33.9457°N 90.7622°W

Information
- Type: Public high school
- School district: North Bolivar Consolidated School District (2014-2018); North Bolivar School District (-2014)
- Staff: 27.46 (on an FTE basis)
- Enrollment: 358 (2018-19)
- Student to teacher ratio: 13.04
- Colors: Blue and Gold
- Team name: Jaguars
- Website: Broad Street High School
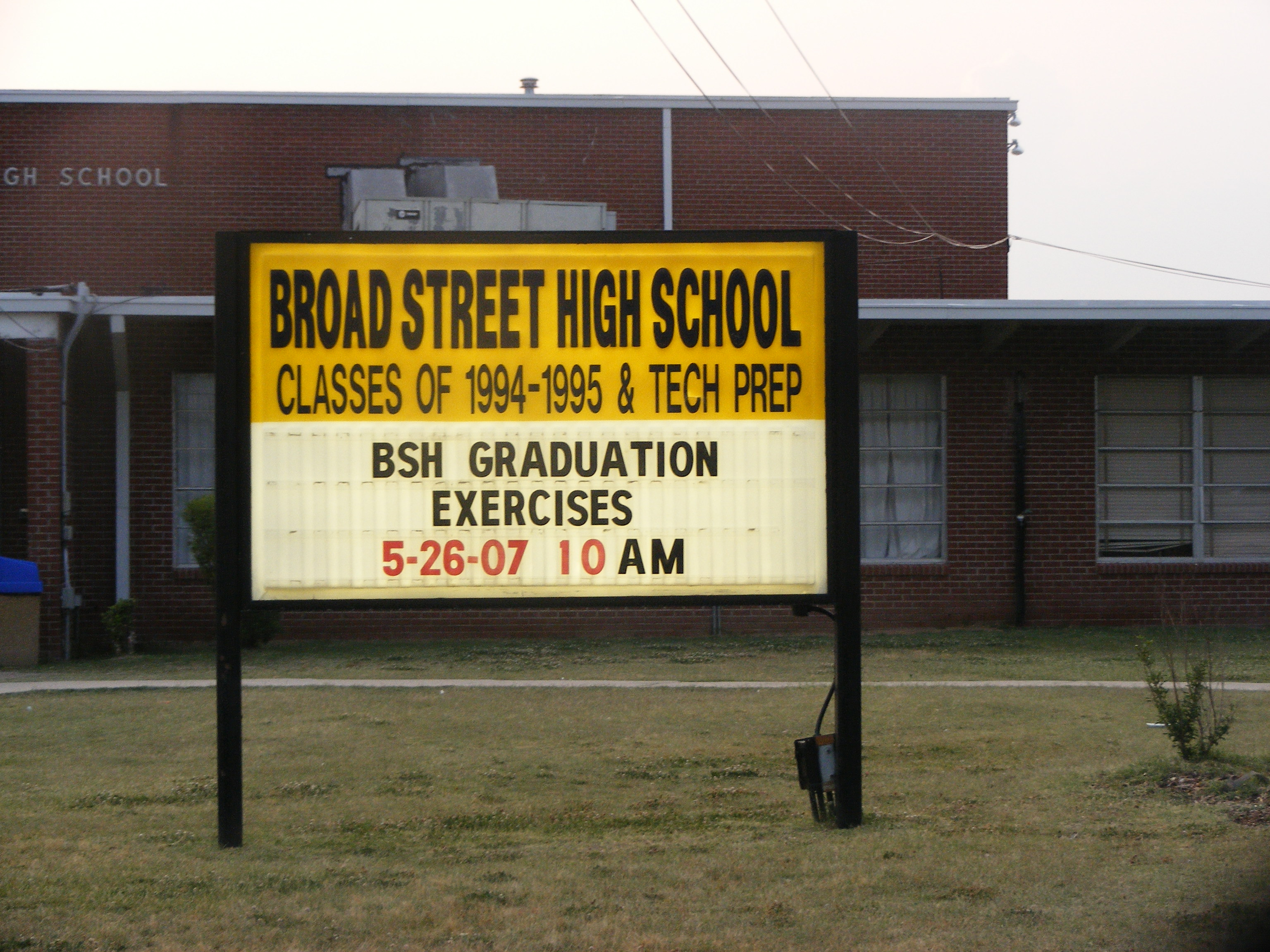

Broad Street High School was a public high school in Shelby, Mississippi. It is a part of the North Bolivar Consolidated School District (formerly the North Bolivar School District). The school served the towns of Shelby, Duncan, and Alligator.

Its school district, the North Bolivar School District, consolidated in 2014. In January 2018, the school had 15 empty classrooms.

In 2018, the school closed with Northside High School, on the former Broad Street campus, replacing it. Even though John F. Kennedy Memorial High School in Mound Bayou had lower maintenance costs than Broad Street, the board kept the Broad Street campus opened as it had more space. Kelsey Davis Betz of Mississippi Today wrote that the Broad Street pupils "seemed generally accepting of the decision."

== Performance ==
For the 2017–2018 school year its graduation rate was 77.5%.
