= James Orville Clark =

American lawyer and politician (1910–1971)

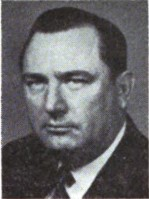
- c. 1949

President pro tempore of the Mississippi State Senate
- In office January 1952 – January 1956
- Preceded by: Oscar O. Wolfe
- Succeeded by: Earl Evans Jr.

Member of the Mississippi State Senate from the 37th district
- In office January 1948 – January 1956

Member of the Mississippi House of Representatives from the Tishomingo County district
- In office January 1940 – January 1944

Personal details
- Born: August 2, 1910 Belmont, Mississippi, U.S.
- Died: November 17, 1971 (aged 61) Tishomingo County, Mississippi, U.S.
- Party: Democratic

James Orville "Click" Clark (August 2, 1910 – November 17, 1971) was an American lawyer and Democratic politician. He served in the Mississippi House of Representatives and Mississippi Senate.

== Biography ==
James Orville Clark was born on August 2, 1910, in Belmont, Mississippi. He was a lawyer. He represented Tishomingo County in the Mississippi House of Representatives from 1940 to 1944. He then served in the Mississippi State Senate, representing the 37th District, from 1948 to 1956. At the start of the 1952 session, Clark was elected to be the senate's president pro tempore for the 1952–1956 term. In 1955, Clark unsuccessfully ran for the Democratic nomination for the office of lieutenant governor of Mississippi. On the night of November 17, 1971, Clark and three others were killed in a twin-engine airplane crash near Iuka, Mississippi.
