= North Bolivar Consolidated School District =

School district in Mississippi, United States

Address
- 204 North Edwards Street Mound Bayou, Mississippi, 38762; United States

District information
- Type: Public
- Grades: K–12
- NCES District ID: 2800186

Students and staff
- Students: 869
- Teachers: 62.94 (FTE)
- Staff: 84.07
- Student–teacher ratio: 13.81

Other information
- Website: nbcsd.k12.ms.us

The North Bolivar Consolidated School District, formerly the North Bolivar School District is a public school district located in northern Bolivar County in the state of Mississippi. It is headquartered in Mound Bayou with an office in Shelby.

The school district serves the towns of Mound Bayou, Shelby, Alligator, Winstonville, and Duncan.

The superintendent as of October 2022 is Maurice Smith.

== History ==
On July 1, 2014, the North Bolivar School District consolidated with the Mound Bayou Public School District to form the North Bolivar Consolidated School District. The central office for this consolidated district is located in Mound Bayou. The two former districts were abolished with the resulting district a new one.

As three of the five board members of the consolidated district were from the former Shelby-based North Bolivar school district, the representatives of that district had full control of the entire district. After the merger with North Bolivar perception of Mound Bayou district residents was that the state had interfered with a previously stable school district.

The district's board voted to close two schools effective 2018, on a 3 to 2 basis: John F. Kennedy High School and Shelby Middle School, as the district overall had fewer students than before and because of a diminished financial situation. In August 2018 the Mississippi Supreme Court finalized the closure of Kennedy.

== Academic performance ==
For the 2018–2019 school year the State of Mississippi stated that the school district had an "F" accountability rating. The district argued that the state had factored in the graduation rates of the high schools even though the state stated that it would use the overall accountability rating of the district for those schools in the event of their consolidation.

== Schools ==
Secondary school (grades 7–12):

- Northside High School (Shelby)

Elementary schools:

- Brooks Elementary School (Duncan)
- I.T. Montgomery Elementary School (Mound Bayou)
  - It was named after Isaiah Montgomery, cofounder of Mound Bayou.

Former schools

- Broad Street High School (Shelby)
- John F. Kennedy Memorial High School (Mound Bayou)
- Shelby Middle School (Shelby)

== Demographics ==
=== 2008–09 school year ===
There were a total of 737 students enrolled in the pre-merger North Bolivar School District during the 2008–2009 school year. The gender makeup of the district was 49% female and 51% male. The racial makeup of the district was 99.19% African American, 0.54% Hispanic and 0.27% White. Currently 100% of students are eligible to receive free or reduced lunch.

=== Previous school years ===
| School Year | Enrollment | Gender Makeup | | Racial Makeup | | | | |
| School Year | Enrollment | Female | Male | Asian | African American | Hispanic | Native American | White |
|---|---|---|---|---|---|---|---|---|
| 2007-08 | 777 | 48% | 52% | – | 98.84% | 0.90% | – | 0.13% |
| 2006-07 | 770 | 49% | 51% | – | 98.96% | 0.78% | – | 0.26% |
| 2005-06 | 810 | 49% | 51% | – | 98.27% | 1.60% | – | 0.12% |
| 2004-05 | 891 | 48% | 52% | – | 97.87% | 1.68% | – | 0.45% |
| 2003-04 | 917 | 47% | 53% | – | 98.26% | 1.53% | – | 0.21% |
| 2002-03 | 966 | 48% | 52% | – | 98.55% | 0.93% | – | 0.52% |

== Accountability statistics ==
=== 2002–2007 ===
| | 2006–07 | 2005–06 | 2004–05 | 2003–04 | 2002–03 |
|---|---|---|---|---|---|
| District Accreditation Status | Accredited | Advised | Accredited | Accredited | Accredited |
School Performance Classifications
| Level 5 (Superior Performing) Schools | 0 | 0 | 0 | 0 | 0 |
| Level 4 (Exemplary) Schools | 0 | 2 | 0 | 1 | 0 |
| Level 3 (Successful) Schools | 2 | 1 | 1 | 0 | 0 |
| Level 2 (Under Performing) Schools | 1 | 0 | 0 | 2 | 2 |
| Level 1 (Low Performing) Schools | 0 | 0 | 2 | 0 | 1 |
| Not Assigned | 0 | 0 | 0 | 0 | 0 |

=== 2008–2009 ===
| | 2008–09 |
|---|---|
| District Accreditation Status | Accredited |
School Performance Classifications
| Level 7 (Star School) Schools | 0 |
| Level 6 (High Performing) Schools | 0 |
| Level 5 (Successful) Schools | 1 (Brooks Elementary School) |
| Level 4 (Academic Watch) Schools | 1 (Shelby Middle School) |
| Level 3 (Low-Performing) Schools | 0 |
| Level 2 (At-Risk of Failing) Schools | 1 (Broad Street High School) |
| Level 1 (Failing) Schools | 0 |
| Not Assigned | 0 |

== See also ==
- List of school districts in Mississippi
