= Eddie C. Campbell =

American blues guitarist and singer

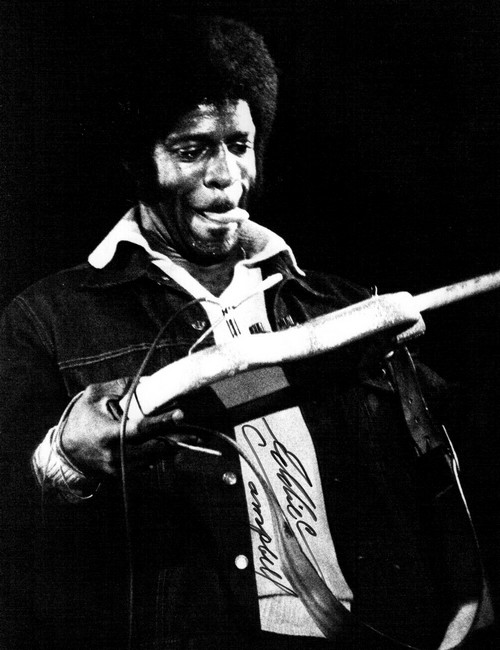
- Campbell in Belgium, October 1979

Background information
- Born: May 6, 1939; Duncan, Mississippi, United States
- Died: November 20, 2018 (aged 79) Oak Park, Illinois, United States
- Genres: Chicago blues
- Occupation(s): Guitarist, singer
- Instrument: Guitar
- Years active: 1976–2018

Eddie C. Campbell (May 6, 1939 – November 20, 2018) was an American blues guitarist and singer in the Chicago blues scene.

== Biography ==
Campbell was born in Duncan, Mississippi. He moved to Chicago at the age of ten, and by age 12 was learning from the blues musicians Muddy Waters, Magic Sam, and Otis Rush.

In his early years as a professional musician, he played as a sideman with Howlin' Wolf, Little Walter, Little Johnny Taylor, and Jimmy Reed. In 1976, Willie Dixon hired him to play in the Chicago Blues All-Stars. Campbell's debut album, King of the Jungle, featuring Carey Bell on harmonica and Lafayette Leake on piano, was released the next year.

In 1979, Campbell participated in the American Blues Legends '79 album and tour of Europe, both organised by UK based label Big Bear Records.

In 1984, Campbell left Chicago for Europe, living first in the Netherlands and later in Duisburg, Germany, where he remained for ten years before returning to Chicago.

Campbell's last album was Spider Eating Preacher (Delmark, 2012). It was nominated for a Blues Music Award in 2013 in the category Traditional Blues Album.

In February 2013, Campbell suffered a stroke and a heart attack while on tour in Germany, leaving him paralyzed on the right side of his body. His wife, Barbara Basu, started the Eddie C. Campbell Assistance Fund to raise money to fly him back to Chicago for further medical treatment. He died in Oak Park, Illinois on November 20, 2018, aged 79.

== Discography ==
- King of the Jungle (Mr. Blues, 1977; reissued by Rooster Blues)
- Let's Pick It! (Black Magic Records, 1984; reissued by Evidence Records)
- The Baddest Cat on the Block (JSP Records, 1985)
- Mind Trouble (Double Trouble, 1988)
- That's When I Know (Blind Pig Records, 1994)
- Hopes and Dreams (Rooster Blues, 1997)
- Gonna Be Alright (Icehouse Records, 1999)※「Mind Troblue」Same Contents
- Show de Bola (Blues Special Records, 2005)
- Tear This World Up (Delmark Records, 2009)
- Spider Eating Preacher (Delmark Records, 2012)

=== Appears on ===
- American Blues Legends '79 (Big Bear Records, 1979)
