= Northside High School (Mississippi) =

High school in Mississippi, United States

Coordinates: 33.9458°N 90.7622°W

- Shelby, Bolivar County, Mississippi; United States

Information
- Established: 2018; 8 years ago
- Grades: 7-12
- Colors: Blue and Orange
- Mascot: Alligator

Northside High School is a public secondary school in Shelby, Mississippi, serving grades 7–12. It is the only high school of the North Bolivar Consolidated School District. The district serves, in addition to Shelby: Alligator, Duncan, Mound Bayou, and Winstonville. The alligator is the mascot. The school colors are blue and orange.

It opened in 2018 as a consolidation of Broad Street High School and John F. Kennedy Memorial High School, with the school on the former Broad Street campus. The combined athletic teams began operation upon the school's opening. The school board kept the Broad Street campus open because it had more space, even though the Kennedy campus was less costly to maintain. The new name Northside High was chosen by the student body.

== Performance ==
For the 2018–2019 school year its graduation rate was 77.5%.
