= Nightshade (disambiguation) =

Nightshade is the common name for plants in the genus Solanum, and more generally for related plants in the family Solanaceae.

Nightshade(s) or Night Shade(s) may also refer to:

== Other plants ==
- Enchanter's nightshade, any of the plants in the genus Circaea, in the willowherb family Onagraceae

== Art, entertainment and media ==
=== Fictional entities ===
- Nightshade (DC Comics), a comic book superheroine published by DC Comics
- Nightshade (Dungeons & Dragons), a type of monster in Dungeons & Dragons
- Tilda Johnson, also known as Dr. Nightshade and Deadly Nightshade, a comic book super-villain in the Marvel Universe
- James "Jim" Nightshade, a character from the novel Something Wicked This Way Comes
- A character in the Magic Kingdom of Landover stories by Terry Brooks
- A character from the animated television program C.O.P.S.

=== Literature ===
- Nightshade (Butler novel), a 1989 science fiction novel by Jack Butler
- Nightshade (Gatiss novel), a 1992 Doctor Who novel by Mark Gatiss
- Nightshades: Thirteen Journeys Into Shadow, an anthology of dark fantasy/horror short stories by Tanith Lee
- Night Shade, a 1976 book by Dorothy Daniels and illustrated by Hector Garrido
- Night Shade: Gothic Tales by Women, a 1999 novel edited by Victoria Brownworth & Judith Redding, which earned them Lambda Literary Awards
- "Night Shades", a short story in Donna Andrews' Meg Langslow series
- Nightshade (Horowitz novel), the thirteenth book in the Alex Rider series by Anthony Horowitz

=== Music ===
- Night Shade (album), a 2014 album by Lanie Lane
- Night Shades, a 2011 album by Cobra Starship
- "Nightshade", a song by Mike Oldfield from the 2005 album Light + Shade

=== Video games ===
- Nightshade (1985 video game), a video game by Ultimate Play The Game
- Nightshade (1992 video game), a video game for the Nintendo Entertainment System
- Nightshade (2003 video game), a video game for the PlayStation 2

=== Other art, entertainment, and media ===
- Night Shade, a 1996 film by Fred Olen Ray
- Night Shade, a work choreographed by Ulysses Dove

== Other uses ==
- Judy Simpson, nicknamed "Nightshade" in the UK TV show Gladiators
- Night Shade Books, an American publisher
- Nightshade (astronomy software)
- Nightshade (Los Angeles restaurant), an American Asian cuisine restaurant in Los Angeles, California
- Nightshade (Vancouver restaurant), a defunct restaurant in Vancouver, Canada
- Nightshade (wrestler), ring name of English professional wrestler Lucy Gibbs
