= John H. Culkin =

Former American politician

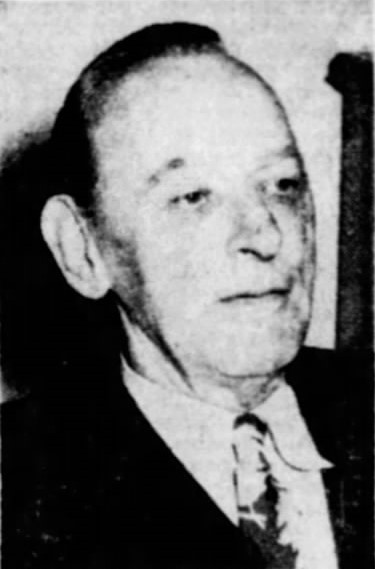

President pro tempore of the Mississippi State Senate
- In office January 7, 1936 – January 1940
- Preceded by: W. C. Adams
- Succeeded by: W. B. Roberts

Member of the Mississippi State Senate from the 12th district
- In office January 1928 – August 7, 1951

Personal details
- Born: April 17, 1887 Oak Ridge, Mississippi, U.S.
- Died: August 7, 1951 (aged 64) Vicksburg, Mississippi, U.S.
- Party: Democratic

John Patrick Henry Culkin (April 17, 1887 – August 7, 1951) was an American politician, educator, and lawyer. He represented Warren County in the Mississippi State Senate from 1928 to 1951 and was the Senate's President pro Tempore from 1936 to 1940. He was a county superintendent of education.

== Early life and career ==
John Patrick Henry Culkin was born on April 17, 1887, near Oak Ridge, Warren County, Mississippi. He was the son of Patrick Culkin, an Irish immigrant to America, and Betty Hearn Culkin. He attended a Teacher School in Warren County. He also studied at a monastery in Athbaskaville, Canada run by the Brothers of the Sacred Heart, graduating in 1903. Culkin then taught school in Indianapolis from 1903 to 1905. He then worked as a clerk for the Alabama and Vicksburg Railroad. He then served as a teacher and principal for Vicksburg schools. In 1911, he also was the editor for the Monday Morning Democrat, a weekly Vicksburg newspaper.

He served as the Superintendent of Education for Warren County between 1912 and 1924. During his time as superintendent, Culkin "organized the first consolidated school district in the United States", known as the Culkin Consolidated School Plan. In 1925, Culkin joined the law office of R. L. McLaurin, the brother of Mississippi Governor Anselm J. McLaurin. After McLaurin's death, Culkin joined the law firm of Chaney & Culkin, and after Chaney's death, Culkin continued the firm by himself.

== Political career ==
=== 1927-1931 ===
In 1927, Culkin, a resident of Vicksburg, was elected to represent the 12th District in the Mississippi State Senate for the 1928–1932 term. During this term, Culkin was the Chairman of the Senate's Human & Benevolent Committee and a member of the following Senate committees: Finance "A"; Insurance; Judiciary "A"; Public Education; Railroads & Franchises; and State Library. During this term, Culkin supported building hard-surfaced highways in Mississippi.

=== 1931-1939 ===
In 1931, Culkin was re-elected to the Senate for the 1932–1936 term. He was re-elected to the 12th District for the 1936-1940 term. On January 7, 1936, Culkin was unanimously elected to be the Senate's President pro Tempore for the four-year term. During this term, Culkin was the Chairman of the Contingent Expenses and Insurances Committees and the Vice Chairman of the Rules Committee, and also served on the following committees: Finance, Judiciary, and Levees.

=== 1939-1943 ===
Culkin was re-elected to represent the 12th District for the 1940–1944 term. During this term, he served as the Chairman of the Senate's Insurance Committee, and served on the following committees: Education; Engrossed Bills; Constitution; Judiciary; Printing; and University & Colleges.

=== 1943-1947 ===
In 1943, Culkin was re-elected to represent the 12th District in the 1944–1948 term. In the term, Culkin chaired the Insurance Committee and served in the following committees: Banks & Banking; Contingent Expenses; Judiciary; Conservation of Natural Resources; Juvenile Delinquency & Child Welfare; Levees; Municipalities; and Temperance.

=== 1947-1951 ===
In 1947, Culkin was re-elected to the Senate. He was the Chairman of both the Contingent Expenses and Insurance Committees. He also served on the following committees: Interstate Cooperation; Judiciary; Public Health & Quarantine; Public Lands; and Temperance Committees, and also served on the Joint Legislative Committee, the Executive Contingent Fund Committee.

Culkin died at 11:40 AM on the morning of August 7, 1951, at the Lutheran Hospital of Vicksburg, Mississippi. He was the dean, or longest-serving member, of the Mississippi State Senate at the time of his death. He was survived by his widow, a brother, and a sister.

== Personal life ==
Culkin was a Roman Catholic and a member of the Knights of Columbus. He was also an Ells and Rotary member. He married Clara Augusta "Gussie" Lindstrom on June 28, 1915, in Vicksburg. They had no children.
