= That's When I Know =

Studio album by Eddie C. Campbell
- Released: 1994
- Genre: Blues
- Label: Blind Pig
- Producers: Eddie C. Campbell, Jerry Del Giudice

Eddie C. Campbell chronology
Mind Trouble (1988)	That's When I Know (1994)	Hopes and Dreams (1997)

That's When I Know is an album by the American musician Eddie C. Campbell, released in 1994. It marked Campbell's return to the United States after spending more than a decade in Europe. Campbell supported the album with a North American tour. The title track was nominated for a W. C. Handy Award.

== Production ==
Recorded in two studios with two bands, the album was produced by Campbell and Jerry Del Giudice. Campbell began writing the album while living in Europe. "Sister Taught Me Guitar" is about Campbell's older sister teaching him the fundamentals of guitar and paying him to learn songs.

== Critical reception ==
Professional ratings
Review scores
Source	Rating
AllMusic	4/5 stars
MusicHound Blues: The Essential Album Guide	5/5 stars
The Penguin Guide to Blues Recordings	3.5/4 stars
Philadelphia Daily News	3/4 stars

USA Today wrote that Campbell's "tasty, note-bending guitar riffs propel the well-written originals." Guitar Player determined that "Campbell understands the power of building a song around a single hypnotic riff." The Philadelphia Daily News said that, "sung in a light, expressive style, Campbell's coy vocals evoke the qualities of soul originals Percy Mayfield and Little Johnny Taylor and ... jazz and blues sage Mose Allison." The Philadelphia Inquirer praised Campbell's "sense of humor, a batch of top-flight original songs, and a sly vocal delivery that's reminiscent of Louisiana blues great Slim Harpo." The Press of Atlantic City deemed the album "a superb slice of less-is-more emotive performing."

AllMusic called the album a "triumphant homecoming set." MusicHound Blues: The Essential Album Guide considered That's When I Know to be one of the best blues albums of the 1990s.

== Track listing ==
No.	Title	Length
1.	"Sister Taught Me Guitar"
2.	"Hey, the Blues Is All Right"
3.	"That's When I Know"
4.	"Busted"
5.	"Sleep"
6.	"Early in the Morning"
7.	"I Been Thinkin'"
8.	"Son of Sons"
9.	"You Make Me Feel All Right"
10.	"Running Wild"
11.	"Devil's Walk"
