= Mound Bayou Public School District =

Public school district in Mississippi, the United States of America

The Mound Bayou Public School District was a public school district with its headquarters in Mound Bayou, Mississippi (USA).

In addition to Mound Bayou, the district also served the town of Winstonville.

On July 1, 2014 consolidated with the North Bolivar School District in Shelby, Mississippi to form the North Bolivar Consolidated School District. The central office for this consolidated district is located in Mound Bayou.

== Schools ==
- John F. Kennedy Memorial High School (Grades 7-12)
- I.T. Montgomery Elementary School (Grades K-6)
  - It was named after Isaiah Montgomery, cofounder of Mound Bayou.

== Operations ==
In 2006 the school district's taxing resulted in the district spending $222 per student, taking up 5% of the operating costs, with other entities paying for the rest. This made Mound Bayou the poorest overall district in Mississippi, though not poorest in terms of taxable property. The State of Mississippi overall funded a greater percentage of the district's costs compared to a school district with more taxable property and/or funds from taxation.

== Performance ==
Circa 2012 the State of Mississippi ranked the district "successful", the only Mississippi Delta district to get that distinction. In addition a Mississippi Business Journal article from that year concluded that of all Mississippi school districts Mound Bayou was the most financially stable. After the merger with North Bolivar perception of Mound Bayou district residents was that the state had interfered with a previously stable school district.

== Demographics ==
=== 2006-07 school year ===
There were a total of 653 students enrolled in the Mound Bayou Public School District during the 2006-2007 school year. The gender makeup of the district was 50% female and 50% male. The racial makeup of the district was 99.69% African American, 0.15% White, and 0.15% Hispanic. All of the district's students were eligible to receive free lunch.

=== Previous school years ===
School Year	Enrollment	Gender Makeup		Racial Makeup				
School Year	Enrollment	Female	Male	Asian	African American	Hispanic	Native American	White
2005-06	696	49%	51%	–	99.86%	–	–	0.14%
2004-05	690	51%	49%	–	100.00%	–	–	–
2003-04	719	50%	50%	0.14%	99.86%	–	–	–
2002-03	720	50%	50%	–	100.00%	–	–	–

== Accountability statistics ==
	2006-07	2005-06	2004-05	2003-04	2002-03
District Accreditation Status	Accredited	Accredited	Accredited	Accredited	Accredited
School Performance Classifications
Level 5 (Superior Performing) Schools	0	0	0	0	0
Level 4 (Exemplary) Schools	0	1	0	0	0
Level 3 (Successful) Schools	2	1	2	2	0
Level 2 (Under Performing) Schools	0	0	0	0	1
Level 1 (Low Performing) Schools	0	0	0	0	1
Not Assigned	0	0	0	0	0

== See also ==
- List of school districts in Mississippi
