= William B. Alexander =

American politician

Bill Alexander
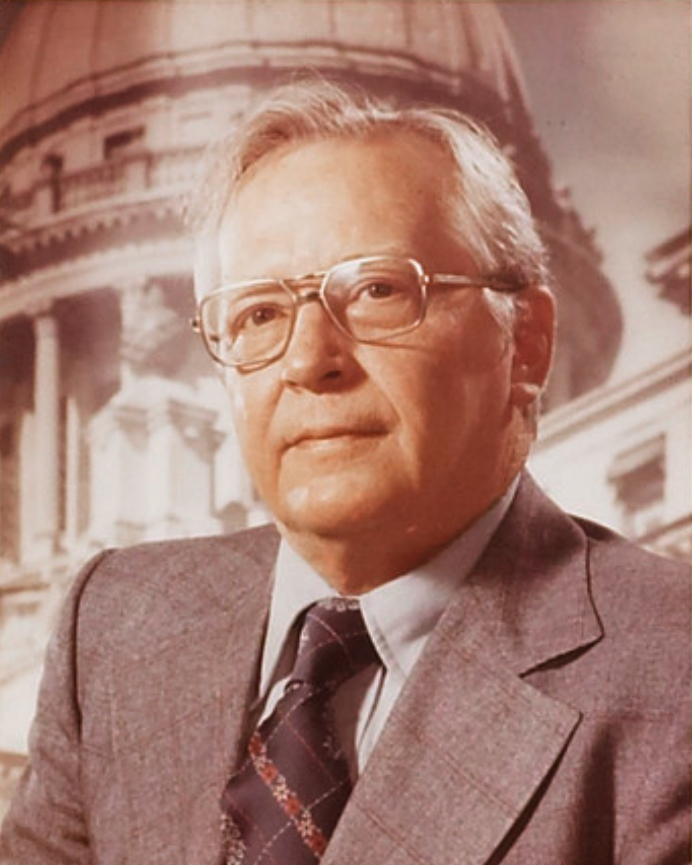

President pro tempore of the Mississippi State Senate
- In office January 1976 – January 1984
- Preceded by: Bob Perry
- Succeeded by: Tommy Brooks

Member of the Mississippi Senate from the 12th district
- In office 1961 – January 1984
- Preceded by: W. B. Alexander Sr.

Personal details
- Born: William Brooks Alexander Jr. December 23, 1921 Boyle, Mississippi, U.S.
- Died: January 19, 2006 (aged 84)
- Party: Democratic
- Spouse: Belle McDonald
- Parent: W. B. Alexander Sr. (father)
- Education: Mississippi College; University of Mississippi

Military service
- Allegiance: United States
- Branch/service: United States Army
- Battles/wars: World War II

William Brooks Alexander Jr. (December 23, 1921 - January 19, 2006) was an American attorney, farmer, and politician. He was a member of the Mississippi State Senate from 1960 to 1984, and its president pro tempore from 1976 to 1984.

== Biography ==
William Brooks Alexander was born on December 23, 1921, in Boyle, Mississippi. He was the son of lawyer and state senator William Brooks Alexander Sr. and Vivien B. Alexander. He attended schools in Boyle for 12 years. He also became an Eagle Scout. He graduated from the University of Mississippi Law School in 1948. He was first elected to the Mississippi State Senate in 1960 after the death of his father, who had been the incumbent. In 1966, while still a state senator, he was a candidate for Congress. In 1976, he became the senate's president pro tempore, and held that position until his last Senate term ended in 1984. He died on January 19, 2006.
