= Nightshade (Butler novel) =

1991 novel by Jack Butler

- Author: Jack Butler
- Language: English
- Genre: Science fiction
- Publisher: HarperCollins Publishers
- Publication date: May 23, 1991
- Pages: 288
- ISBN: 0586090517

Nightshade is a 1989 science fiction novel by Jack Butler. The novel was Butler's first published foray into science fiction.

== Plot ==
The story is set on Mars in the late 21st Century. It follows the exploits of the 400-year-old vampire John Shade, whose comfortable life in the Hellas crater on Mars is disrupted when he is forced to become part of a complex conspiracy to protect the Janglers, a sub-species of humans who have replaced parts of their brains with technology.

Shade eventually becomes the leader of a collection of loners, losers, drop-outs and rebels, holding them together through unwitting charisma and a sense of personal vengeance against the government of Mars.

As a vampire, Shade sometimes feels a lust for blood, though this only occurs once or twice a year - though the Need, as it is called, strikes several times during the course of the novel for reasons that are not fully explained. Shade also possesses increased strength and reflexes, a photographic memory, excellent mathematical knowledge, the ability to change his own shape and the power to "shift" into "high temporal", which tremendously enhances his speed. Shade has read Bram Stoker's Dracula and believes it to be "foolish in many details".

== Shade's companions ==
Jennie Brady: A female Jangler who changes her surname to Jennie Dark in a play on "Jeanne D'Arc", or Joan of Arc, indicating her willingness to die for her cause. Jennie is ten years old by Martian standards, which in Earth terms puts her at nineteen or twenty years old. Shade falls in love with Jennie the moment he meets her. Aside from crude cosmetic surgery to reconstruct her face and part of her skull, she exactly resembles the woman Shade married nearly four hundred years ago while he was still human.

Mandrake: A Starbuck-class artificial intelligence with a dry sense of humour and a passionate love for existentialism. Mandrake is the secret seventh Starbuck AI to be built by Earth engineers for the colonisation of Mars; officially there were only six Starbucks who each went insane after Mars was created. This insanity is likely to be due to the Starbucks' deep, complicated personalities. If Mandrake is any example, they found their own existence hard to justify; they cannot grow old and die like humans, nor can they enter Heaven - should such a place exist. Mandrake has so far avoided the fate of insanity due to his close personal friendship with military strategist RJ Benjamin and, later, John Shade. Shade's relationship with Mandrake tends to be one of mutual antagonism with moments of deep trust.

Minor characters include Shade's colleague and romantic interest Pappy, the government strategist RJ Benjamin and a rich "nettie" called Sinclair.

The novel also features a character called "the No Poet", an unknown author of existentialist poetry. He (or she) claims to be nonexistent, an experimental computer program created as part of ongoing research into sentient artificial intelligence. Despite - or perhaps because of - this, the No Poet's work is highly regarded by humans, and his lonely, forsaken sense of self is shared by many in a dissatisfied future.
