= Earl Evans Jr. =

American politician (1906–1976)

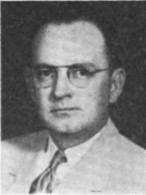
- c. 1949

President pro tempore of the Mississippi State Senate
- In office January 1956 – January 1960
- Preceded by: J. O. Clark
- Succeeded by: George Yarbrough

Member of the Mississippi State Senate from the 18th district
- In office January 1940 – January 1964
- Preceded by: G. B. Herring
- Succeeded by: Frank Leftwich

Personal details
- Born: June 20, 1906 Canton, Mississippi, U.S.
- Died: October 1976 (aged 70)
- Party: Democratic

Earl Evans Jr. (June 20, 1906 – October 1976) was an American Democratic politician and public official in Mississippi. He served in the Mississippi Senate including as President Pro Tempore.

Evans served in the Mississippi Senate, representing the 18th District (Madison County), from 1940 to 1964. He was the Senate's President Pro Tempore from 1956 to 1960. He had been a special agent with the FBI. He lived in Canton, Mississippi and represented Madison County, Mississippi. He was also a businessman and farmer. He married.

A staunch segregationist, he was a leader in the "states rights" movement. He served on the segregationist Legal Educational Advisory Committee (LEAC) and the Mississippi State Sovereignty Commission that worked to thwart civil rights campaigning and preserve segregation.
