= Mississippi Slim (blues musician) =

American singer

- Born: Walter Horn Jr. August 13, 1943; Shelby, Mississippi, U.S.
- Died: April 14, 2010 (aged 66) Greenville, Mississippi, U.S.
- Website: mississippislim.com

Walter Horn Jr. (August 13, 1943 – April 14, 2010), known by the stage name Mississippi Slim, was an American blues singer and performer.

Horn was born in Shelby and grew up in Greenville, Mississippi. In the early 1960s he worked as a tractor driver while singing in local clubs, and in 1968 moved to Chicago to pursue a singing career. Using the name Mississippi Slim, he performed in clubs in Chicago where he became known for his multicolored hair and mismatched clothing, and toured with other blues singers such as Junior Wells. In 1974, he recorded "Crying In The Arms of Another Love", released by Sunflower Records.

He returned to live in Mississippi in 1994, continuing to perform in local clubs and at festivals, and becoming active in Mississippi's "Blues In Schools" Project. He recorded an album, Miracles, in 1999.

He died in 2010 at the age of 66, in Greenville, Mississippi, after suffering a massive heart attack.
