= W. C. Adams =

American politician

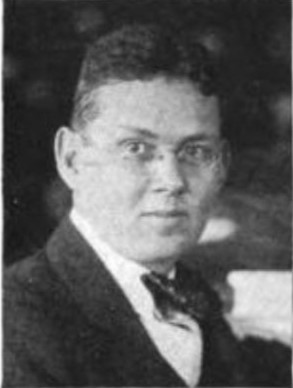
- c. 1924

President Pro Tempore of the Mississippi State Senate
- In office January 1932 – January 1936
- Preceded by: H. H. Casteel
- Succeeded by: John H. Culkin

Member of the Mississippi State Senate from the 37th district
- In office January 1928 – January 1936
- Preceded by: C. R. Lacy
- Succeeded by: M. Arthur Shook

Member of the Mississippi House of Representatives from the Alcorn County district
- In office January 1924 – January 1928

Personal details
- Born: May 25, 1888 Corinth, Mississippi, U.S.
- Died: October 24, 1972 (aged 84) Corinth, Mississippi, U.S.
- Party: Democratic

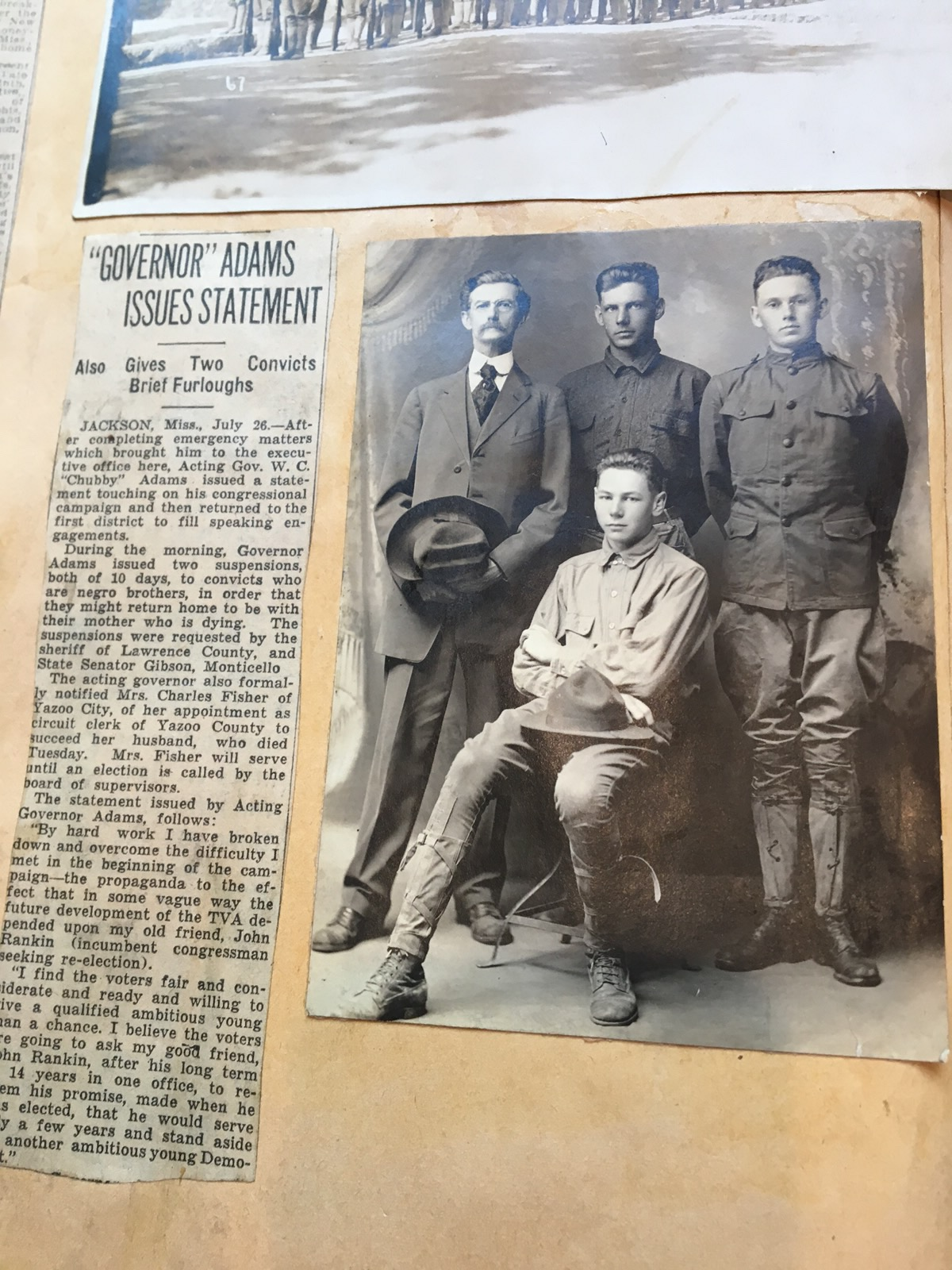

Winfred Cooper "Chubby" Adams (May 25, 1888 - October 24, 1972) was an American politician in Mississippi who served in the Mississippi House of Representatives from 1924 to 1926 and in the Mississippi State Senate from 1928 to 1936. He served as the Senate's President Pro Tempore from 1932 to 1936

== Early life ==
Winfred Cooper Adams was born on May 25, 1888, in Corinth, Mississippi. He was the son of W. T. Adams, who owned a namesake machine company that burned in 1918, and his wife Dorcas Virginia (Johnston) Adams. W. C. Adams attended the public schools of Corinth. He then studied at Princeton University for two years and received a law degree from the University of Mississippi in 1910. W. C. Adams served as an officer in the United States Army Infantry during World War I, reaching the rank of Captain in August 1918 before being discharged in December 1918. Later he received a military pension.

== Career ==
Adams started practicing law in January 1923. In November 1923, Adams was elected to represent Alcorn County as a Democrat in the Mississippi House of Representatives, and served from 1924 to 1928. In 1927, Adams was elected to represent the 37th District (Tishomingo, Alcorn, and Prentiss Counties) in the Mississippi State Senate for the term spanning from 1928 to 1932. During this term, Adams was the chairman of the Judiciary "B" Committee and was also a member of the following committees: Rules, Finance "B", Labor, Military Affairs, Pensions, and To Investigate State Offices. Adams was re-elected and served in the Senate in the 1932-1936 term. During this term, Adams was the Senate's President Pro Tempore.

W. C. Adams was also involved in the Soggy Sweat’s Whiskey Speech of 1954, which used double-speak over the issue of the prohibition of alcohol.

Adams died in October 24, 1972, in Corinth, Mississippi.

== Personal life ==
In September 12, 1912, Adams married Mary E. Kirk and had four children, the eldest Bessie Kirk Adams (1913-1918), died from the Spanish Flu. Following her, they had Johnston Cooper Adams (1916-1995), John Kirk Adams (1918-1994), and William Shattuck Adams I (1923-2005).
