= W. B. Alexander Sr. =

American politician

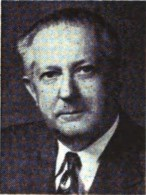
- c. 1949

Member of the Mississippi State Senate from the 30th district
- In office January 1952 – November 7, 1960
- Preceded by: Oscar O. Wolfe
- Succeeded by: William B. Alexander Jr.

Personal details
- Born: February 25, 1894 Birmingham, Alabama, U.S.
- Died: November 7, 1960 (aged 66) Cleveland, Mississippi, U.S.
- Party: Democratic
- Children: 5

William Brooks Alexander Sr. (February 25, 1894 - November 7, 1960) was an American politician. He represented Bolivar County in the Mississippi State Senate from 1952 to his death in 1960.

== Biography ==
William Brooks Alexander Sr. was born on February 25, 1894, in Birmingham, Alabama. He had a brother, R. D. Alexander, and a sister, Marguerite Alexander. He attended the Virginia Military Institute, graduating in 1916. Alexander became a Colonel in the Mississippi State Guard. Starting in 1929, Alexander practiced law in Cleveland, Mississippi.

=== 1951-1955 ===
In 1951, Alexander, a resident of Boyle, Mississippi, was elected to represent the 30th District (Bolivar County) in the Mississippi State Senate for the 1952–1956 term. During this term, Adams was the Chairman of the Senate's Penitentiary and Prisons Committee and the Vice Chairman of the Military Affairs Committee. He also served on the following committees: Insurance; Judiciary; Juvenile Delinquency & Child Welfare; Levees; Railroads & Franchises; and University & Colleges.

=== 1955-1960 ===
In 1955, Alexander was re-elected to represent the 30th District for the 1956–1960 term. During this term, Alexander was once again the Chairman of the Penitentiary Committee and Vice Chairman of the Military Affairs Committee. He also served on the Insurance; Judiciary; Labor; State Library; Transportation; and University & Colleges committees. In 1959, Adams was once again re-elected to the Senate to serve the 1960–1964 term. During this term, Alexander was the Chairman of the Judiciary Committee, and Vice Chairman of the Executive Contingent Fund Committee. While still in office, Adams died of a heart attack on the night of November 7, 1960. He was succeeded in the Senate by his son, William Brooks Alexander Jr.

== Personal life ==
Alexander was a Baptist. He was also a member of the Scottish Rite of the Freemasons.

He was married to Vivien Burns (August 27, 1897 - November 4, 1993). They had five children: Vivien A. (Alexander) Barbee (1918–2001), William Brooks Jr. (1921–2006), Richard Davison (1924–2014), Narcissa (Alexander) Richardson, and Antoinette (Alexander) Myers. By 1960, he had 17 grandchildren.
