= Duncan, Mississippi =

- Town
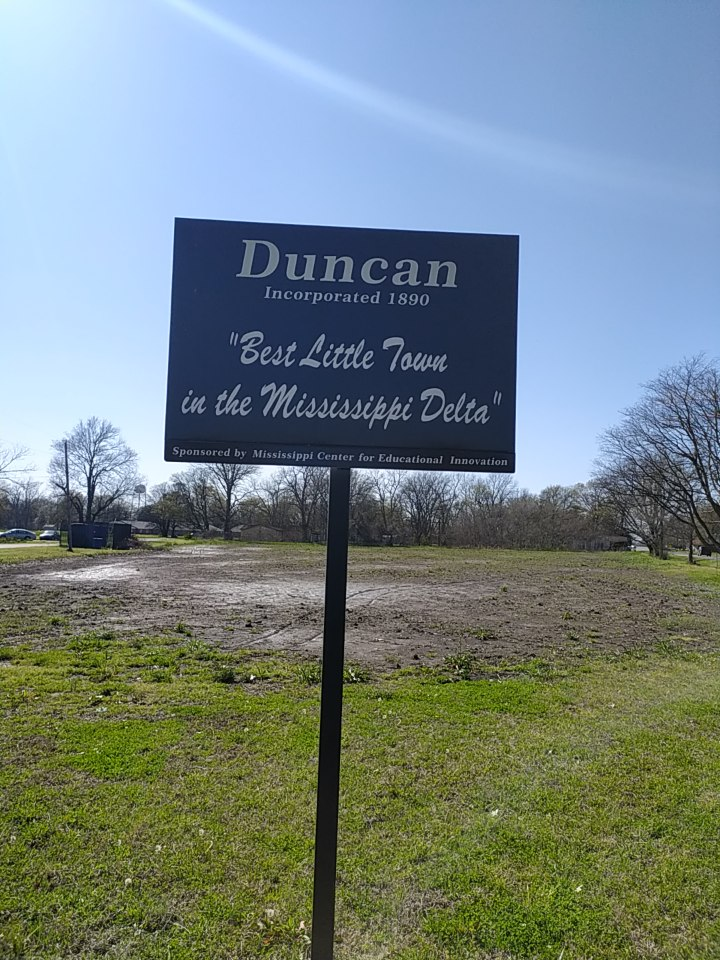
- Welcome sign in Duncan
- Nickname: "Best Little Town in the Mississippi Delta"
- Location of Duncan, Mississippi

- Location in the United States
- Coordinates: 34°02′20″N 90°44′56″W
- Country: United States
- State: Mississippi
- County: Bolivar

Area
  - Total: 0.92 sq mi (2.37 km^{2})
  - Land: 0.92 sq mi (2.37 km^{2})
  - Water: 0 sq mi (0.00 km^{2})
- Elevation: 157 ft (48 m)

Population (2020)
  - Total: 276
  - Density: 301.4/sq mi (116.36/km^{2})
- Time zone: UTC-6 (Central (CST))
  - Summer (DST): UTC-5 (CDT)
- ZIP code: 38740
- Area code: 662
- FIPS code: 28-20380
- GNIS feature ID: 2406405

Duncan is a town in Bolivar County, Mississippi, United States. Per the 2020 census, the population was 276.

== History ==
Duncan is named for an early "leading citizen."

== Geography ==
According to the United States Census Bureau, the town has a total area of 0.9 square miles (2.3 km^{2}), all land.

== Demographics ==
Historical population
Census	Pop.	Note	%±
1900	172		—
1910	284		65.1%
1920	322		13.4%
1930	337		4.7%
1940	419		24.3%
1950	436		4.1%
1960	465		6.7%
1970	599		28.8%
1980	501		−16.4%
1990	416		−17.0%
2000	578		38.9%
2010	423		−26.8%
2020	276		−34.8%
U.S. Decennial Census; 2010 2020

=== Racial and ethnic composition ===
Duncan town, Mississippi – Racial and ethnic composition Note: the US Census treats Hispanic/Latino as an ethnic category. This table excludes Latinos from the racial categories and assigns them to a separate category. Hispanics/Latinos may be of any race.
Race / Ethnicity (NH = Non-Hispanic)	Pop 2000	Pop 2010	Pop 2020	% 2000	% 2010	% 2020
White alone (NH)	112	104	80	19.38%	24.59%	28.99%
Black or African American alone (NH)	445	308	183	76.99%	72.81%	66.30%
Native American or Alaska Native alone (NH)	0	0	0	0.00%	0.00%	0.00%
Asian alone (NH)	0	0	1	0.00%	0.00%	0.36%
Native Hawaiian or Pacific Islander alone (NH)	0	0	0	0.00%	0.00%	0.00%
Other race alone (NH)	0	0	0	0.00%	0.00%	0.00%
Mixed race or Multiracial (NH)	3	0	5	0.52%	0.00%	1.81%
Hispanic or Latino (any race)	18	11	7	3.11%	2.60%	2.54%
Total	578	423	276	100.00%	100.00%	100.00%

=== 2000 Census ===
As of the census of 2000, there were 578 people, 177 households, and 124 families residing in the town. The population density was 620.7 inhabitants per square mile (239.7/km^{2}). There were 186 housing units at an average density of 199.7 per square mile (77.1/km^{2}). The racial makeup of the town was 19.55% White, 77.51% African American, 2.25% from other races, and 0.69% from two or more races. Hispanic or Latino of any race were 3.11% of the population.

There were 177 households, out of which 42.4% had children under the age of 18 living with them, 36.2% were married couples living together, 26.0% had a female householder with no husband present, and 29.4% were non-families. 24.3% of all households were made up of individuals, and 11.3% had someone living alone who was 65 years of age or older. The average household size was 2.95 and the average family size was 3.47.

In the town, the population was spread out, with 33.4% under the age of 18, 7.1% from 18 to 24, 25.1% from 25 to 44, 18.3% from 45 to 64, and 16.1% who were 65 years of age or older. The median age was 33 years. For every 100 females, there were 87.7 males. For every 100 females age 18 and over, there were 86.9 males.

The median income for a household in the town was $14,286, and the median income for a family was $16,875. Males had a median income of $24,750 versus $11,429 for females. The per capita income for the town was $8,329. About 51.1% of families and 58.6% of the population were below the poverty line, including 75.4% of those under age 18 and 29.6% of those age 65 or over.

== Education ==
Duncan is served by the North Bolivar Consolidated School District, formerly known as the North Bolivar School District until it consolidated in 2014.

Students are zoned to Brooks Elementary School in Duncan, as it belonged to the pre-consolidation North Bolivar School District, and Northside High School (the only secondary school in the district) in Shelby.

Northside High opened in 2018 after Broad Street High School in Shelby consolidated into it. Shelby Middle School closed in 2018.

== Notable people ==
- Eddie C. Campbell, musician
- Bobby Crespino, former tight end for the Cleveland Browns and New York Giants
- Willie Love, musician
