= Shelby, Mississippi =

City in Mississippi, United States

- City
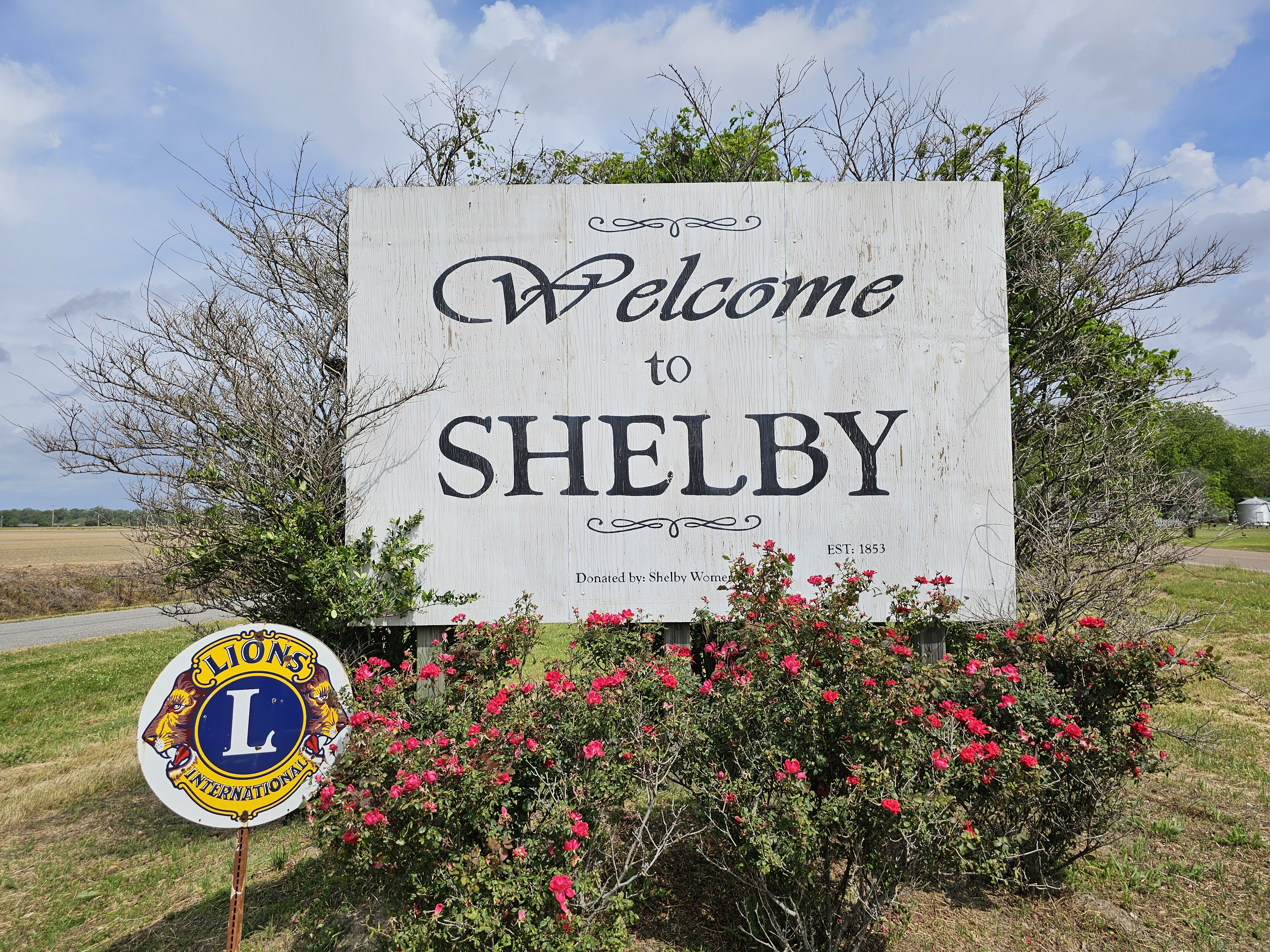
- Welcome sign
- Nickname: Smoke Town
- Motto: "City of Justice"
- Location of Shelby, Mississippi

- Location in the United States
- Coordinates: 33°57′03″N 90°45′55″W
- Country: United States
- State: Mississippi
- County: Bolivar

Government
  - Mayor: Robert L. Scott

Area
  - Total: 2.74 sq mi (7.10 km^{2})
  - Land: 2.73 sq mi (7.07 km^{2})
  - Water: 0.012 sq mi (0.03 km^{2})
- Elevation: 151 ft (46 m)

Population (2020)
  - Total: 2,021
  - Density: 740.0/sq mi (285.73/km^{2})
- Time zone: UTC-6 (Central (CST))
  - Summer (DST): UTC-5 (CDT)
- ZIP code: 38774
- Area code: 662
- FIPS code: 28-67040
- GNIS feature ID: 2405453
- Website: shelbyms.com

Shelby is a city in Bolivar County, Mississippi, United States. As of the 2020 census, Shelby had a population of 2,021. The town of Shelby was established in 1853 by Tom Shelby, who had purchased a block of land there from the federal government.

== Geography ==
According to the United States Census Bureau, the city has a total area of 2.7 square miles (7.1 km^{2}), of which 0.012 square miles (0.03 km^{2}), or 0.39%, is water.

The rear entrance of the Mississippi State Penitentiary in unincorporated Sunflower County is about 10 miles (16 km) east of Shelby, along Mississippi Highway 32.

== Demographics ==
Historical population
| Census | Pop. | Note | %± |
|---|---|---|---|
| 1910 | 645 | | — |
| 1920 | 1,300 | | 101.6% |
| 1930 | 1,811 | | 39.3% |
| 1940 | 1,956 | | 8.0% |
| 1950 | 2,148 | | 9.8% |
| 1960 | 2,384 | | 11.0% |
| 1970 | 2,645 | | 10.9% |
| 1980 | 2,540 | | −4.0% |
| 1990 | 2,806 | | 10.5% |
| 2000 | 2,926 | | 4.3% |
| 2010 | 2,229 | | −23.8% |
| 2020 | 2,021 | | −9.3% |
U.S. Decennial Census

=== Racial and ethnic composition ===
Shelby city, Mississippi – Racial and ethnic composition Note: the US Census treats Hispanic/Latino as an ethnic category. This table excludes Latinos from the racial categories and assigns them to a separate category. Hispanics/Latinos may be of any race.
| Race / Ethnicity (NH = Non-Hispanic) | Pop 2000 | Pop 2010 | Pop 2020 | % 2000 | % 2010 | % 2020 |
|---|---|---|---|---|---|---|
| White alone (NH) | 232 | 105 | 63 | 7.93% | 4.71% | 3.12% |
| Black or African American alone (NH) | 2,652 | 2,103 | 1,911 | 90.64% | 94.35% | 94.56% |
| Native American or Alaska Native alone (NH) | 2 | 0 | 1 | 0.07% | 0.00% | 0.05% |
| Asian alone (NH) | 3 | 0 | 0 | 0.10% | 0.00% | 0.00% |
| Native Hawaiian or Pacific Islander alone (NH) | 0 | 0 | 0 | 0.00% | 0.00% | 0.00% |
| Other race alone (NH) | 0 | 0 | 4 | 0.00% | 0.00% | 0.20% |
| Mixed race or Multiracial (NH) | 8 | 4 | 25 | 0.27% | 0.18% | 1.24% |
| Hispanic or Latino (any race) | 29 | 17 | 17 | 0.99% | 0.76% | 0.84% |
| Total | 2,926 | 2,229 | 2,021 | 100.00% | 100.00% | 100.00% |

=== 2020 census ===
As of the 2020 census, Shelby had a population of 2,021. The median age was 35.3 years. 28.7% of residents were under the age of 18 and 16.0% of residents were 65 years of age or older. For every 100 females there were 81.3 males, and for every 100 females age 18 and over there were 72.0 males age 18 and over.

0.0% of residents lived in urban areas, while 100.0% lived in rural areas.

There were 757 households in Shelby, of which 35.9% had children under the age of 18 living in them. Of all households, 21.9% were married-couple households, 18.6% were households with a male householder and no spouse or partner present, and 54.2% were households with a female householder and no spouse or partner present. About 32.9% of all households were made up of individuals and 13.7% had someone living alone who was 65 years of age or older.

There were 837 housing units, of which 9.6% were vacant. The homeowner vacancy rate was 1.4% and the rental vacancy rate was 11.5%.

=== 2010 census ===
As of the 2010 United States census, there were 2,229 people living in the city. The racial makeup of the city was 94.3% Black, 4.7% White and 0.2% from two or more races. 0.8% were Hispanic or Latino of any race.

=== 2000 census ===
As of the census of 2000, there were 2,926 people, 919 households, and 677 families living in the city. The population density was 1,079.5 inhabitants per square mile (416.8/km^{2}). There were 963 housing units at an average density of 355.3 per square mile (137.2/km^{2}). The racial makeup of the city was 7.93% White, 91.08% African American, 0.07% Native American, 0.10% Asian, 0.38% from other races, and 0.44% from two or more races. Hispanic or Latino of any race were 0.99% of the population.

There were 919 households, out of which 43.3% had children under the age of 18 living with them, 26.3% were married couples living together, 41.7% had a female householder with no husband present, and 26.3% were non-families. 23.1% of all households were made up of individuals, and 10.0% had someone living alone who was 65 years of age or older. The average household size was 3.07 and the average family size was 3.60.

In the city, the population was spread out, with 37.5% under the age of 18, 9.8% from 18 to 24, 24.5% from 25 to 44, 15.8% from 45 to 64, and 12.5% who were 65 years of age or older. The median age was 27 years. For every 100 females, there were 82.4 males. For every 100 females age 18 and over, there were 70.4 males.

The median income for a household in the city was $17,798, and the median income for a family was $20,368. Males had a median income of $26,250 versus $19,554 for females. The per capita income for the city was $10,567. About 39.9% of families and 44.5% of the population were below the poverty line, including 56.5% of those under age 18 and 21.3% of those age 65 or over.

== Education ==
Shelby is served by the North Bolivar Consolidated School District, formerly known as the North Bolivar School District until it consolidated in 2014.

Students are zoned to Brooks Elementary School (in Duncan), as it belonged to the pre-consolidation North Bolivar School District, and Northside High School (the only secondary school in the district).

Northside High opened in 2018 after Broad Street High School in Shelby consolidated into it. Shelby Middle School closed in 2018.

== Notable people ==
- Fred Barnett, former wide receiver for the Philadelphia Eagles.
- Walter Luzar "Choker" Campbell, musician
- Dorsett Terrell Davis, football player
- William S. Fischer, keyboardist, saxophonist, arranger, and composer
- Erma Franklin, gospel and R&B singer, sister of the gospel and R&B singer Aretha Franklin
- Hattie Littles, soul singer
- Sonny Boy Nelson, blues musician
- Vera B. Rison, Michigan state legislator
- Willie A. A. Grady, Author and Shelby Historian
- Mississippi Slim, blues musician
- Delbert Tibbs, writer and anti-death penalty activist
- Henry Townsend, blues singer most associated with St. Louis, Missouri, on the St. Louis Walk of Fame
- Gerald Wilson, jazz trumpeter, composer and arranger
