= Josiah D. Coleman =

American judge (born 1972)

Josiah Coleman

Associate Justice of the Supreme Court of Mississippi
- Incumbent
- Assumed office January 7, 2013
- Preceded by: George C. Carlson Jr.

Personal details
- Born: Josiah Dennis Coleman; November 3, 1972 (age 53)
- Education: University of Mississippi (BA, JD); Duke University (LLM)

Josiah Dennis Coleman (born November 3, 1972) is an associate justice of the Supreme Court of Mississippi.

== Early life and education ==
Coleman grew up in Choctaw County, near Ackerman, and graduated valedictorian from Ackerman High School. He graduated cum laude from the University of Mississippi with a Bachelor of Arts degree in history and philosophy. He earned his Juris Doctor degree from the University of Mississippi School of Law. In 2020, Coleman received his Master of Laws in judicial studies from Duke Law School.

== Career ==
After law school, he served for almost two years as a law clerk for U.S. Magistrate Judge S. Allan Alexander of the United States District Court for the Northern District of Mississippi in Oxford. Before joining the Supreme Court of Mississippi, he practiced law for 12 years, first in Tupelo, then in Oxford. His practice concentrated on defense litigation and appellate advocacy in the areas of insurance, product liability and professional malpractice.

Coleman is the grandson of James P. Coleman, who served as Governor of Mississippi, as a judge on the United States Court of Appeals for the Fifth Circuit, and briefly as a justice of the Mississippi Supreme Court, resigning to accept appointment as state attorney general. Thomas Coleman, Josiah Coleman's father, was one of the original members of the Mississippi Court of Appeals when the intermediate appellate court began in 1995.

=== Supreme Court of Mississippi ===
Coleman, who was endorsed by the Republican Party, won his election to the Mississippi Supreme Court comfortably in 2012. On November 3, 2020, voters elected him to a second term.

In 2021, Coleman wrote the majority decision that struck down a voter-approved medical marijuana ballot initiative. Coleman argued that the ballot initiative because the state constitution said ballot initiatives had to have a certain number of signatures from Mississippi's five districts; however, Mississippi lost one of its districts in the 2000 census, so ballot signatures were only collected in the four remaining districts. Coleman wrote that the drafters of the constitutional provision "wrote a ballot-initiative process that cannot work in a world where Mississippi has fewer than five representatives in Congress." The implications of the decision is that the Supreme Court effectively rolled back the ability to conduct ballot initiatives; at the time, ballot initiatives on allowing early and expanding Medicaid were being considered.

Legal offices
Preceded by George C. Carlson, Jr.	Associate Justice of the Supreme Court of Mississippi; 2013–present	Incumbent
