= Debra M. Brown =

American judge (born 1963)

Debra Brown
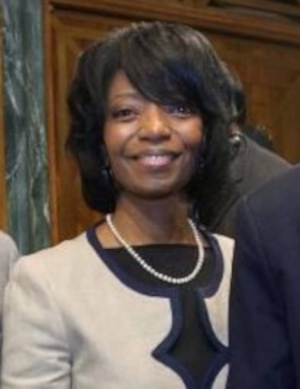

Chief Judge of the United States District Court for the Northern District of Mississippi
- Incumbent
- Assumed office June 11, 2021
- Preceded by: Sharion Aycock

Judge of the United States District Court for the Northern District of Mississippi
- Incumbent
- Assumed office November 5, 2013
- Appointed by: Barack Obama
- Preceded by: W. Allen Pepper Jr.

Personal details
- Born: Debra Marie Brown; 1963 (age 62–63) Yazoo City, Mississippi, U.S.
- Education: Mississippi State University (BArch); University of Mississippi (JD)

Debra Marie Brown (born 1963) is the chief United States district judge of the United States District Court for the Northern District of Mississippi. She is the first African-American woman to serve as chief judge for the Northern District of Mississippi.

== Biography ==
Brown was born in 1963, in Yazoo City, Mississippi. She received a Bachelor of Architecture in 1987, from Mississippi State University. Prior to attending law school, she worked as an architect in the Washington, D.C., area. She received a Juris Doctor in 1997 from the University of Mississippi School of Law, where she served as articles editor of the law review. After graduation, she worked at the law firm of Phelps Dunbar LLP for more than fourteen years. From 2012 to 2013, she was a shareholder at the law firm of Wise Carter Child & Caraway, P.A. in Jackson, Mississippi, where she handled a wide variety of commercial litigation matters before both federal and state courts. From 2003 to 2004, she served as President of the Mississippi Women Lawyers Association.

=== Federal judicial service ===
On May 16, 2013, President Barack Obama nominated Brown to serve as a United States district judge of the United States District Court for the Northern District of Mississippi, to the seat vacated by Judge W. Allen Pepper, Jr., who died on January 24, 2012. On July 10, 2013, a hearing on her nomination was held before the Senate Judiciary Committee. On August 1, 2013, her nomination was favorably reported out of committee by voice vote. Brown was confirmed on November 4, 2013, by a 90–0 vote. She received her judicial commission on November 5, 2013, and was sworn in by Judge Michael P. Mills on December 18, 2013, becoming the first African-American to become a district judge in Mississippi. Brown became the chief judge on June 11, 2021, succeeding Judge Sharion Aycock, becoming the first African-American woman to serve as chief judge for the Northern District of Mississippi.

== See also ==
- List of African-American federal judges
- List of African-American jurists
- List of first women lawyers and judges in Mississippi

Legal offices
Preceded by W. Allen Pepper Jr.	Judge of the United States District Court for the Northern District of Mississippi; 2013–present	Incumbent
Preceded by Sharion Aycock	Chief Judge of the United States District Court for the Northern District of Mississippi; 2021–present	Incumbent
