= Jim M. Greenlee =

American judge (born 1952)

Judge of the Mississippi Court of Appeals
- In office January 20, 2016 – October 14, 2024
- Appointed by: Phil Bryant
- Preceded by: James D. Maxwell II
- Succeeded by: John D. Weddle

United States Attorney for the Northern District of Mississippi
- In office October 30, 2001 – January 31, 2010
- President: George W. Bush; Barack Obama
- Preceded by: Calvin D. Buchanan
- Succeeded by: Felicia C. Adams

Personal details
- Born: Jim Ming Greenlee; January 13, 1952 (age 74)
- Party: Republican
- Spouse: Ann Veazey
- Children: 2
- Education: University of Mississippi (BE, JD)
- Occupation: Attorney

Military service
- Allegiance: United States
- Branch/service: United States Navy
- Years of service: 1974–1978 (active); 1978–1997 (reserve)
- Rank: Captain

Jim M. Greenlee (born January 13, 1952) is an American attorney who served as a judge on the Mississippi Court of Appeals from 2016 to 2024. He previously served as the United States Attorney for the Northern District of Mississippi from 2001 to 2010.

== Biography and career ==
Greenlee graduated from the University of Mississippi with a Bachelor of Engineering in 1974 before joining the United States Navy. He served active duty for four years and continued service in the Naval Reserve, retiring in 1997 at the rank of Captain. During his naval service, he was commanding officer of a Reserve Naval Criminal Investigative Service (NCIS) Unit.

Greenlee earned his JD from the University of Mississippi School of Law in 1981 and entered private practice in North Mississippi. He was hired as Assistant United States Attorney in the Northern District of Mississippi in 1987, working in the Civil Division, where he became the lead civil fraud attorney trying bankruptcy, tort, employment rights, eminent domain and white collar criminal cases. In 2001, he was nominated to be United States Attorney by President George W. Bush and was confirmed by the United States Senate, serving until January 31, 2010. After leaving the U.S. Attorney's office, he joined the law firm Holcomb Dunbar in Oxford, practicing white collar and criminal law, governmental enforcement defense and litigates in federal and state courts.

Greenlee is a member of the Mississippi State Bar, the Lafayette County Bar Association and is a former member of the Federal Bar Association, having served the Federal Bar as Northern District vice president. A bencher in the William C. Keady Chapter of American Inns of Court, he is also a fellow of The Litigation Counsel of America, an honorary of attorneys in trial practice. Greenlee was inducted as a fellow of the Mississippi Bar Foundation in 2010.

In January 2016, Governor Phil Bryant appointed Greenlee to the Mississippi Court of Appeals, succeeding James D. Maxwell II, who had been elevated to the Supreme Court of Mississippi. Greenlee was elected without opposition to a full eight-year term in November 2016. In 2024 Governor Tate Reeves appointed John. D. Weddle to replace Greenlee who retired.
