= Robert P. Chamberlin =

American judge (born 1965)

Bobby Chamberlin
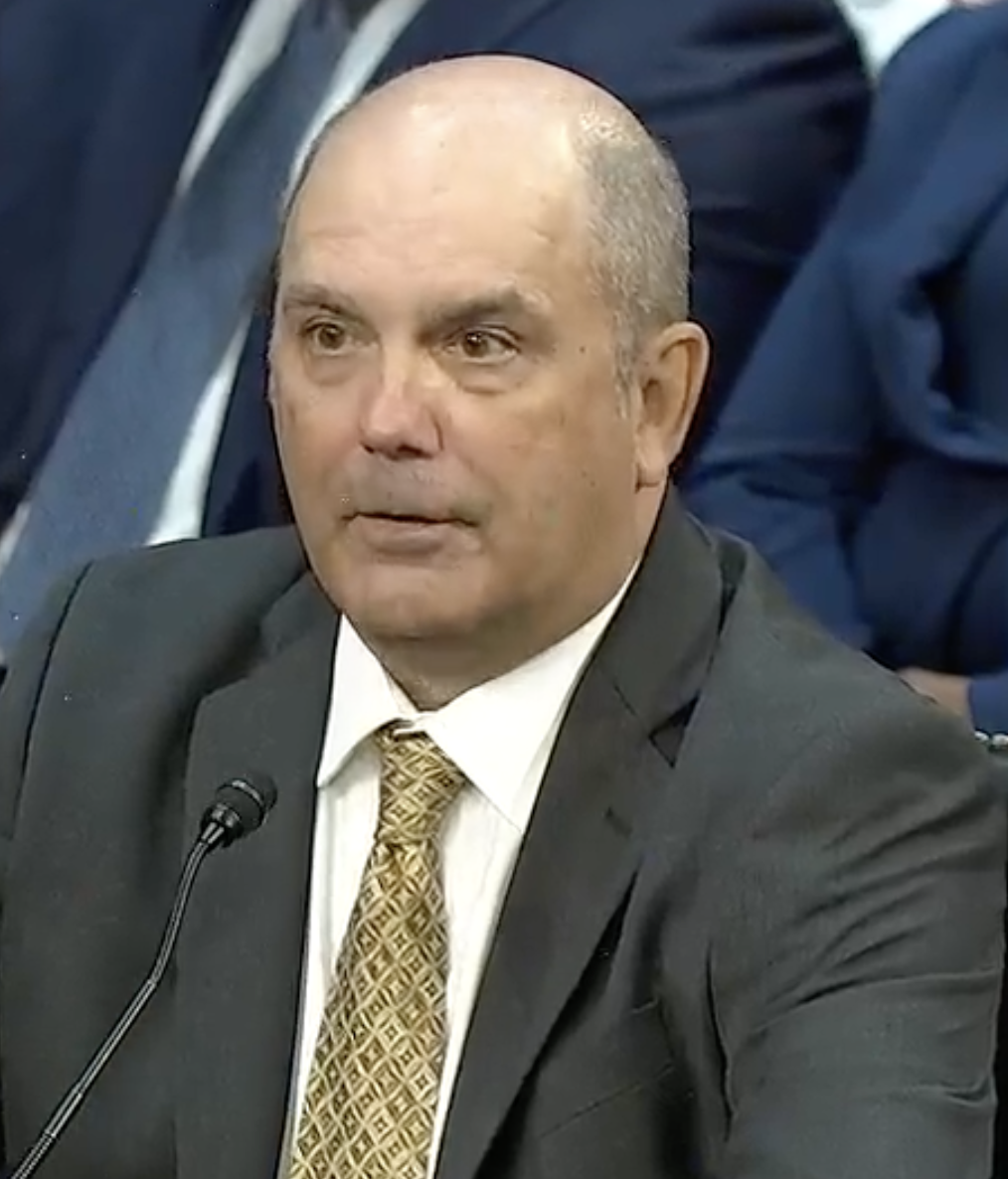

Judge of the United States District Court for the Northern District of Mississippi
- Incumbent
- Assumed office December 16, 2025
- Appointed by: Donald Trump
- Preceded by: Sharion Aycock

Associate Justice of the Mississippi Supreme Court
- In office January 2, 2017 – December 16, 2025
- Preceded by: Ann Hannaford Lamar
- Succeeded by: Celeste Wilson

Member of the Mississippi State Senate from the 1st district
- In office January 4, 2000 – November 24, 2004
- Preceded by: Bill Hawks
- Succeeded by: Doug E. Davis

Personal details
- Born: Robert Porter Chamberlin; April 6, 1965 (age 61) Memphis, Tennessee, U.S.
- Party: Republican
- Education: University of Mississippi (BA, JD)

Robert Porter Chamberlin (known professionally as Bobby Chamberlin) (born April 6, 1965) is a United States district judge of the United States District Court for the Northern District of Mississippi. He previously served as an associate justice of the Supreme Court of Mississippi.

== Early life and education ==
Chamberlin was born on April 6, 1965. Chamberlin received his Bachelor of Arts from the University of Mississippi in 1987 and his Juris Doctor from the University of Mississippi School of Law in 1990. He was admitted to the bar in 1990.

== Career ==
Political and legal career in Mississippi

Chamberlin began his career as a municipal judge for Hernando, Mississippi, from 1991 for 1999, including a stint as municipal prosecutor for Horn Lake, Mississippi, in 1992.

In 1999, he entered state politics and was elected to the Mississippi State Senate, serving Senate District 1 of DeSoto County for five years.

On November 24, 2004, he was appointed to the 17th Circuit District by Governor Haley Babour

On November 29, 2016, Chamberlin was elected to Supreme Court of Mississippi, winning a runoff election, when he received around 55% of the vote for District 3, Place. On January 3, 2017, he took the oath of office at the Court and took the seat last held by Justice Ann Hannaford Lamar.

=== Federal judicial service ===
On August 12, 2025, President Donald Trump announced his intention to nominate Chamberlin to the United States District Court for the Northern District of Mississippi. On September 3, 2025, Chamberlin testified before the U.S. Senate Judiciary Committee. On November 20, 2025, the Senate Judiciary Committee voted to send his nomination to the full U.S. Senate by a party line 12–10 vote. On December 8, 2025, the U.S. Senate invoked cloture on his nomination by a 52–44 vote. The following day, his nomination was confirmed by a 51–46 vote. Chamberlin received his judicial commission on December 16, 2025.

== Personal life ==
Chamberlin is married to his wife, Kim, with whom he has one son. He lives in Hernando.

Legal offices
Preceded by Ann Hannaford Lamar	Associate Justice of the Mississippi Supreme Court; 2017–2025	Succeeded by Celeste Wilson
Preceded by Sharion Aycock	Judge of the United States District Court for the Northern District of Mississippi; 2025–present	Incumbent
