= William C. Lamar =

American attorney

William Chadwick Lamar
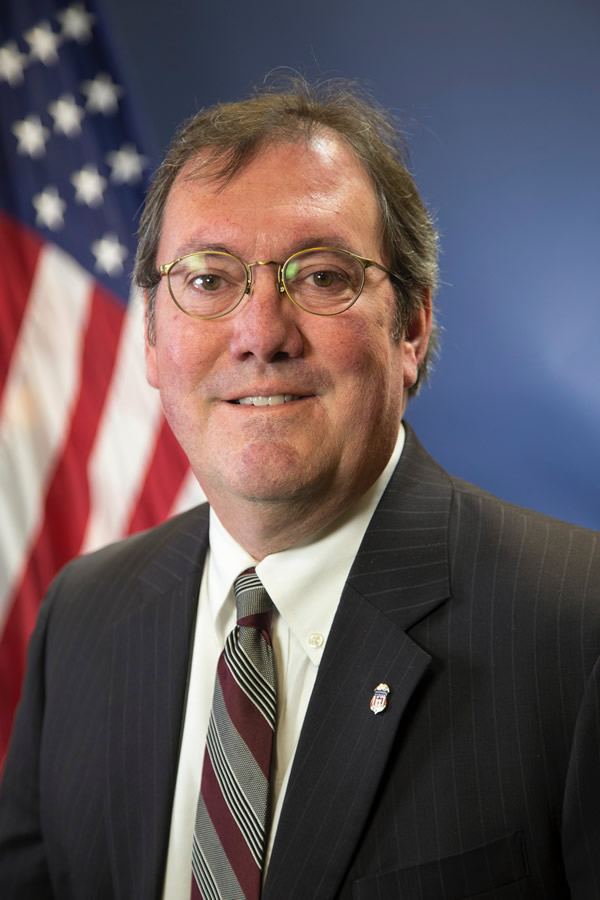

United States Attorney for the Northern District of Mississippi
- In office November 22, 2017 – February 27, 2021
- President: Donald Trump; Joe Biden
- Preceded by: Felicia C. Adams
- Succeeded by: vacant

Personal details
- Education: Millsaps College; University of Mississippi School of Law

William Chadwick Lamar is an American attorney who served as the United States Attorney for the United States District Court for the Northern District of Mississippi from 2017 to 2021.

== United States Attorney's office ==
Lamar joined the U.S. Attorney's Office in 1991. He served as senior litigation counsel and appellate chief from 2008 to 2014. In 2014, he became chief of the Criminal Division. Previously he served as the Assistant United States Attorney in the United States District Court for the Northern District of Mississippi. Lamar received the Executive Office for United States Attorneys Director's Award in 2004. A graduate of Millsaps College and the University of Mississippi School of Law, Lamar clerked for Neal Brooks Biggers Jr. of the U.S. District Court for the Northern District of Mississippi.

== United States Attorney ==
On July 27, 2017, he was nominated by Donald Trump to become the United States Attorney for the United States District Court for the Northern District of Mississippi. He was confirmed by the United States Senate by voice vote on November 9, 2017, and sworn into office on November 22, 2017. On February 8, 2021, he along with 55 other Trump-era attorneys were asked to resign. Lamar resigned on February 27, 2021.
