= Celeste Wilson =

American judge

Associate Justice of the Mississippi Supreme Court
- Incumbent
- Assumed office August 1, 2026
- Appointed by: Tate Reeves
- Preceded by: Bobby Chamberlin

Judge of the Mississippi Circuit Court
- In office February 6, 2017 – July 31, 2026
- Appointed by: Phil Bryant
- Preceded by: Bobby Chamberlin
- Succeeded by: Vacant

Personal details
- Education: Delta State University (BA); University of Memphis (JD)

Celeste Embrey Wilson is an American judge who has served as an associate justice of the Supreme Court of Mississippi since 2026. She was a judge of the DeSoto County Court from 2009 to 2017 and a Mississippi circuit court judge from 2017 to 2026. Governor Tate Reeves appointed her to the state Supreme Court to fill the vacancy created when Robert P. Chamberlin became a federal judge. Wilson is the sixth woman to serve on the court.

== Education and early career ==
Wilson earned a bachelor's degree in business administration from Delta State University and a Juris Doctor from the Cecil C. Humphreys School of Law at the University of Memphis. She was director of membership for the Southaven Chamber of Commerce from 1999 to 2001. From 2002 through 2008, she served as an assistant district attorney for Mississippi's 17th Judicial District, where she prosecuted criminal cases in northern Mississippi.

== Judicial career ==
Wilson was elected to Place 2 of the DeSoto County Court in November 2008, defeating John Barnett "Jack" Turner, and took office in January 2009. As a county court judge, she presided over cases involving juvenile delinquency, child neglect and abuse, domestic violence, civil disputes and appeals. She was re-elected without opposition in 2014.

In February 2017, Governor Phil Bryant appointed Wilson to the 17th Circuit Court District to succeed Chamberlin, who had been elected to the Mississippi Supreme Court. The district included DeSoto, Panola, Tallahatchie, Tate and Yalobusha counties. After the legislature made DeSoto County a separate circuit court district, Wilson was elected without opposition to Place 2 of the new 23rd Circuit Court District in November 2022 and began the term in January 2023. The DeSoto County district was later renumbered as the 21st Circuit Court District.

Wilson served as secretary and vice-chair of the Conference of Circuit Court Judges before being elected chair in 2025. She also served on the Mississippi Supreme Court Advisory Committee on Rules and was appointed to the Bar Complaint Tribunal in 2023.

=== Mississippi Supreme Court ===
On July 27, 2026, Reeves appointed Wilson to the Northern District, Place 1 seat on the Mississippi Supreme Court. She succeeded Chamberlin, whose confirmation to the United States District Court for the Northern District of Mississippi had left the seat vacant. Her term began on August 1, and she took the oath of office on August 4. She will serve until the seat is filled through a special election.

Legal offices
Preceded by Bobby Chamberlin	Associate Justice of the Mississippi Supreme Court; 2026–present	Incumbent
