= Rex Kenton Jones =

American politician

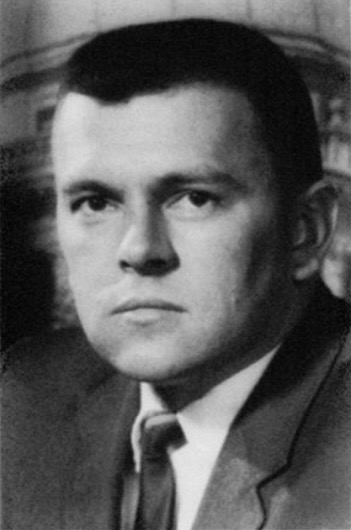

Member of the Mississippi House of Representatives
- In office 1964–1972

Personal details
- Born: November 16, 1933 (age 92) Hattiesburg, Mississippi, U.S.
- Education: University of Southern Mississippi; University of Mississippi School of Law

Rex Kenton Jones (born November 16, 1933) is an American politician. He served as a member of the Mississippi House of Representatives.

== Life and career ==
Jones was born in Hattiesburg, Mississippi. He attended the University of Southern Mississippi and the University of Mississippi School of Law.

Jones served in the Mississippi House of Representatives from 1964 to 1972.
