= Judge Davidson =

Judge Davidson may refer to:

- Glen H. Davidson (born 1941), judge of the United States District Court for the Northern District of Mississippi
- Thomas Whitfield Davidson (1876–1974), judge of the United States District Court for the Northern District of Texas
