= Orma Rinehart Smith =

American judge

Senior Judge of the United States District Court for the Northern District of Mississippi
- In office August 16, 1978 – July 5, 1982

Judge of the United States District Court for the Northern District of Mississippi
- In office July 25, 1968 – August 16, 1978
- Appointed by: Lyndon B. Johnson
- Preceded by: Claude Feemster Clayton
- Succeeded by: Lyonel Thomas Senter Jr.

Personal details
- Born: Orma Rinehart Smith; September 4, 1904 Booneville, Mississippi, U.S.
- Died: July 5, 1982 (aged 77)
- Education: University of Mississippi School of Law (LL.B.)

Orma Rinehart Smith (September 4, 1904 – July 5, 1982) was a United States district judge of the United States District Court for the Northern District of Mississippi.

== Education and career ==
Born in Booneville, Mississippi, Smith received a Bachelor of Laws from the University of Mississippi School of Law in 1927. He was in private practice in Corinth, Mississippi from 1928 to 1968.

== Federal judicial service ==
On July 17, 1968, Smith was nominated by President Lyndon B. Johnson to a seat on the United States District Court for the Northern District of Mississippi vacated by Judge Claude Feemster Clayton. He was confirmed by the United States Senate on July 25, 1968, and received his commission the same day. He assumed senior status on August 16, 1978. Smith served in that capacity until his death on July 5, 1982.

Legal offices
Preceded by Claude Feemster Clayton	Judge of the United States District Court for the Northern District of Mississippi; 1968–1978	Succeeded by Lyonel Thomas Senter Jr.
