= William Lamar =

William Lamar may refer to:

- William Bailey Lamar (1853–1928), American politician and lawyer from Florida
- William H. Lamar (1859–1928), American lawyer and politician in Maryland
- Bill Lamar (1897–1970), Major League Baseball player
- William C. Lamar, United States Attorney in Mississippi
