= Felicia C. Adams =

American attorney (born 1960)

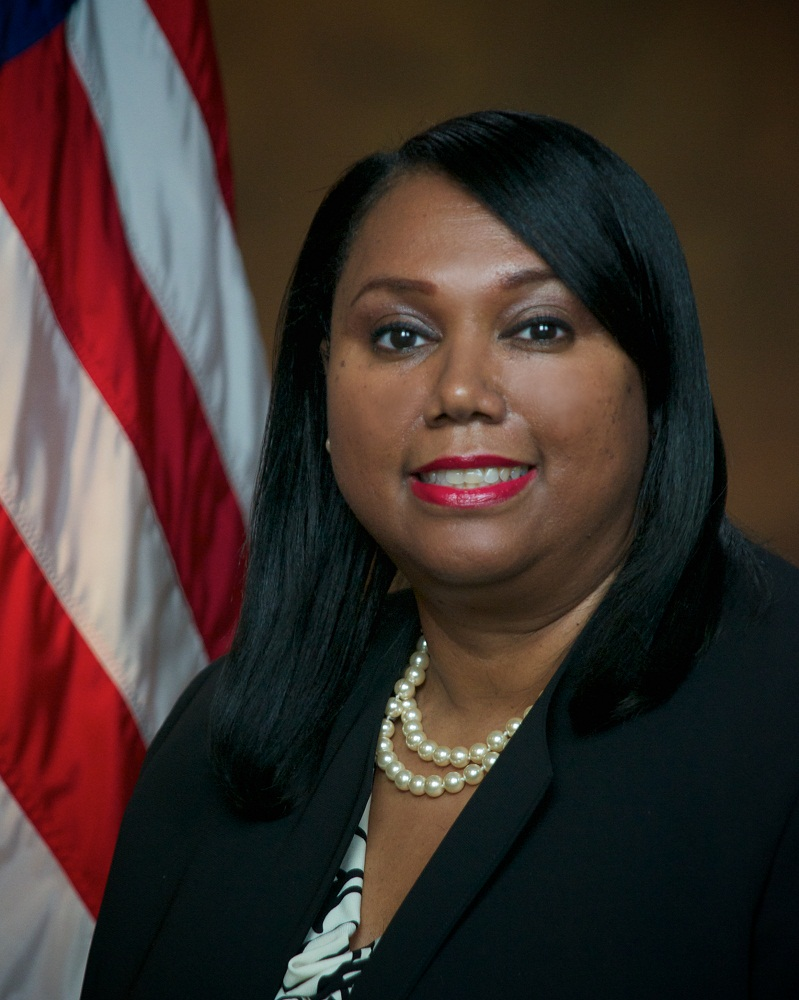

United States Attorney for the Northern District of Mississippi
- In office July 3, 2011 – March 10, 2017
- President: Barack Obama; Donald Trump
- Preceded by: Jim M. Greenlee
- Succeeded by: William C. Lamar

Personal details
- Born: May 12, 1960 (age 66)
- Party: Democratic
- Education: Jackson State University (BA); University of Mississippi (JD)

Felicia C. Adams (born May 12, 1960) is an American attorney who served as United States Attorney for the United States District Court for the Northern District of Mississippi from 2011 to 2017.

== Education ==
Adams graduated in 1981 from Jackson State University, and in 1984 from the University of Mississippi School of Law.

== Career ==
From 1984 to 1985, Adams was a law clerk for Odell Horton of the United States District Court for the Western District of Tennessee. Adams worked as legal counsel in the Mississippi's governor’s office from 1988 to 1989, and was an Assistant United States Attorney for the United States District Court for the Northern District of Mississippi from 1989 to 2000. In 2000, Adams was appointed assistant United States Attorney for the United States District Court for the Southern District of Mississippi. From 2011 to 2017, Adams served as the first African-American United States Attorney for the United States District Court for the Northern District of Mississippi.

== See also ==
- 2017 dismissal of U.S. attorneys
