= Sharion Aycock =

American judge (born 1955)

Senior Judge of the United States District Court for the Northern District of Mississippi
- Incumbent
- Assumed office April 15, 2025

Chief Judge of the United States District Court for the Northern District of Mississippi
- In office June 2, 2014 – June 11, 2021
- Preceded by: Michael P. Mills
- Succeeded by: Debra M. Brown

Judge of the United States District Court for the Northern District of Mississippi
- In office October 22, 2007 – April 15, 2025
- Appointed by: George W. Bush
- Preceded by: Glen H. Davidson
- Succeeded by: Robert P. Chamberlin

Judge of the First Circuit Court of Mississippi
- In office 2003–2007

Personal details
- Born: Sharion Marie Harp; 1955 (age 70–71) Tupelo, Mississippi, U.S.
- Spouse: William R. "Randy" Aycock
- Children: 1
- Education: Mississippi State University (BA); Mississippi College (JD)

Sharion Marie Aycock (née Harp; born 1955) is an American lawyer and jurist serving as a senior United States district judge of the United States District Court for the Northern District of Mississippi. She served as the chief judge from 2014 to 2021. She is the first female federal district court judge in Mississippi.

== Early life and education ==
Aycock was born in Tupelo, Mississippi and raised in Tremont. She received a Bachelor of Arts degree in economics from Mississippi State University with a minor in political science in 1977. She received a Juris Doctor from Mississippi College School of Law in 1980, where she graduated second in the class and was co-editor-in-chief of the Mississippi College Law Review. She became a member of the Mississippi Bar in 1980.

== Career ==
Aycock worked in private practice in Mississippi from 1980 to 2003 with two firms and as a solo practitioner. Aycock served as the Itawamba County prosecuting attorney from 1984 to 1992. She was a circuit court judge on the First Circuit Court of Mississippi from 2003 to 2007.

=== Federal judicial service ===
Aycock was nominated by President George W. Bush on March 19, 2007, to a seat on the United States District Court for the Northern District of Mississippi vacated by Glen H. Davidson. She was unanimously confirmed by the United States Senate on October 4, 2007, and received her commission on October 22, 2007. She became chief judge on June 2, 2014. She is the first woman to be chief judge of the court in Mississippi. Her term as chief judge ended on June 11, 2021. She assumed senior status on April 15, 2025.

In June 2026, Aycock sanctioned lawyers from both sides of a case for using generative AI, which was made obvious due to citations of non-existent case law in their briefs.

== Personal life ==
Aycock is married to William R. "Randy" Aycock and has one son.

== See also ==
- List of first women lawyers and judges in Mississippi

Legal offices
Preceded by Glen H. Davidson	Judge of the United States District Court for the Northern District of Mississippi; 2007–2025	Succeeded by Robert P. Chamberlin
Preceded by Michael P. Mills	Chief Judge of the United States District Court for the Northern District of Mississippi; 2014–2021	Succeeded by Debra M. Brown
