= Martha Chamallas =

American legal scholar

Martha E. Chamallas is an American legal scholar.

Chamallas earned a Bachelor of Arts in sociology from Tufts University and a Juris Doctor from the Louisiana State University Law Center. She clerked for Charles Clark before working for the United States Department of Labor. Chamallas then returned to academia, successively teaching at the University of Pittsburgh School of Law, the Louisiana State University Law Center, and the University of Iowa College of Law. In 2002, Chamallas joined the Ohio State University Moritz College of Law, where she was later appointed the Robert J. Lynn Professor of Law.

Chamallas is an elected member of the American Law Institute.
