= Alonzo Holmes Sturgeon =

American politician

Member of the Mississippi House of Representatives
- In office 1963–???

Personal details
- Born: December 13, 1931 Natchez, Mississippi, U.S.
- Died: December 17, 2010 (aged 79) Baton Rouge, Louisiana, U.S.
- Spouse: Bettye Moore (m. 1953)
- Children: 1
- Education: University of Southern Mississippi; Tulane University; Tulane University Law School; University of Mississippi; Ole Miss Law

Alonzo Holmes Sturgeon (December 13, 1931 – December 17, 2010) was an American politician. He served as a member of the Mississippi House of Representatives.

== Life and career ==
Sturgeon was born in Natchez, Mississippi. He attended Natchez High School, the University of Southern Mississippi, Tulane University, Tulane University Law School, the University of Mississippi and Ole Miss Law.

Sturgeon was an attorney. He was elected to the Mississippi House of Representatives in 1963, representing Wilkinson County, Mississippi. He helped establish Mississippi Educational Television.

Sturgeon died in December 2010 in Baton Rouge, Louisiana, at the age of 79.
