= W. Allen Pepper Jr. =

American judge

Judge of the United States District Court for the Northern District of Mississippi
- In office July 7, 1999 – January 24, 2012
- Appointed by: Bill Clinton
- Preceded by: Lyonel Thomas Senter Jr.
- Succeeded by: Debra M. Brown

Personal details
- Born: July 20, 1941 Greenwood, Mississippi, U.S.
- Died: January 24, 2012 (aged 70) Jackson, Mississippi, U.S.
- Education: University of Mississippi (B.A.); University of Mississippi School of Law (J.D.)

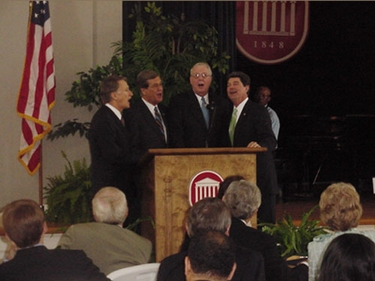
Pepper singing with Trent Lott, Gaylen Roberts, and Guy Hovis in 2004

William Allen Pepper Jr. (July 20, 1941 – January 24, 2012) was a United States district judge of the United States District Court for the Northern District of Mississippi.

== Education and career ==
Born in Greenwood, Mississippi, Pepper received a Bachelor of Arts degree from the University of Mississippi in 1963 and a Juris Doctor from the University of Mississippi School of Law in 1968. He was in private practice in Cleveland, Mississippi from 1968 to 1999.

== Federal judicial service ==
On March 8, 1999, Pepper was nominated by President Bill Clinton to a seat on the United States District Court for the Northern District of Mississippi vacated by Lyonel Thomas Senter Jr. Pepper was confirmed by the United States Senate on June 30, 1999, and received his commission on July 7, 1999. His service was terminated on January 24, 2012, due to his death.

Legal offices
Preceded by Lyonel Thomas Senter Jr.	Judge of the United States District Court for the Northern District of Mississippi; 1999–2012	Succeeded by Debra M. Brown
