= Lyonel Thomas Senter Jr. =

American judge

Senior Judge of the United States District Court for the Northern District of Mississippi
- In office July 30, 1998 – May 18, 2011

Chief Judge of the United States District Court for the Northern District of Mississippi
- In office 1982–1998
- Preceded by: William Colbert Keady
- Succeeded by: Neal Brooks Biggers Jr.

Judge of the United States District Court for the Northern District of Mississippi
- In office December 21, 1979 – July 30, 1998
- Appointed by: Jimmy Carter
- Preceded by: Orma Rinehart Smith
- Succeeded by: W. Allen Pepper Jr.

Personal details
- Born: Lyonel Thomas Senter Jr. July 30, 1933 Fulton, Mississippi, U.S.
- Died: May 18, 2011 (aged 77) Tupelo, Mississippi, U.S.
- Education: University of Southern Mississippi (BS); University of Mississippi School of Law (LLB)

Lyonel Thomas Senter Jr. (July 30, 1933 – May 18, 2011) was a United States district judge of the United States District Court for the Northern District of Mississippi.

== Education and career ==
Born in Fulton, Mississippi, Senter received a Bachelor of Science degree from the University of Southern Mississippi in 1956 and a Bachelor of Laws from the University of Mississippi School of Law in 1959. He was in private practice in Aberdeen, Mississippi, between 1959 and 1968, also serving as Monroe County prosecuting attorney from 1960 to 1963. He was a United States Commissioner for the United States District Court for the Northern District of Mississippi from 1966 to 1968. He was a circuit judge for the state of Mississippi, on the First Judicial District of Mississippi, from 1968 to 1979.

== Federal judicial service ==
On October 11, 1979, Senter was nominated by President Jimmy Carter to a seat on the United States District Court for the Northern District of Mississippi vacated by Judge Orma Rinehart Smith. Senter was confirmed by the United States Senate on December 20, 1979, in a 43–25 vote, and received his commission on December 21, 1979. He served as Chief Judge from 1982 to 1998. He assumed senior status on July 30, 1998, and took inactive senior status on April 8, 2011. He attended the National Judicial College at the University of Nevada, Reno.

== Death ==
Senter died at North Mississippi Medical Center in Tupelo, Mississippi, on May 18, 2011.

== Sources ==
Legal offices
Preceded by Orma Rinehart Smith	Judge of the United States District Court for the Northern District of Mississippi; 1979–1998	Succeeded by W. Allen Pepper Jr.
Preceded by William Colbert Keady	Chief Judge of the United States District Court for the Northern District of Mississippi; 1982–1998	Succeeded by Neal Brooks Biggers Jr.
