= Claude Feemster Clayton =

American judge (1909–1969)

Judge of the United States Court of Appeals for the Fifth Circuit
- In office October 27, 1967 – July 4, 1969
- Appointed by: Lyndon B. Johnson
- Preceded by: Seat established by 80 Stat. 75
- Succeeded by: Charles Clark

Chief Judge of the United States District Court for the Northern District of Mississippi.
- In office 1966–1967
- Preceded by: Office established
- Succeeded by: William Colbert Keady

Judge of the United States District Court for the Northern District of Mississippi.
- In office March 12, 1958 – November 23, 1967
- Appointed by: Dwight D. Eisenhower
- Preceded by: Elijah Allen Cox
- Succeeded by: Orma Rinehart Smith

Personal details
- Born: Claude Feemster Clayton; August 4, 1909 Tupelo, Mississippi, U.S.
- Died: July 4, 1969 (aged 59)
- Education: University of Mississippi School of Law (LLB)

Claude Feemster Clayton (August 4, 1909 – July 4, 1969) was a United States circuit judge of the United States Court of Appeals for the Fifth Circuit and previously was a United States district judge of the United States District Court for the Northern District of Mississippi.

== Education and career ==
Born in Tupelo, Mississippi, Clayton received a Bachelor of Laws from the University of Mississippi School of Law in 1931. He was in private practice in Tupelo from 1931 to 1935, and was a prosecuting attorney for Lee County, Mississippi, from 1935 to 1938. He was a Circuit Judge of the First Circuit Court District of Mississippi from 1938 to 1942. After serving in the United States Army, he was in private practice in Tupelo from 1945 to 1958. He was the Tupelo city attorney from 1949 to 1953.

=== Army ===
He served in the Army from 1942 to 1945 and 30 years in the Mississippi National Guard. He was commander of the 31st Infantry Division and retired as a major general.

== Federal judicial service ==
On February 24, 1958, Clayton was nominated by President Dwight D. Eisenhower to a seat on the United States District Court for the Northern District of Mississippi vacated by Judge Elijah Allen Cox. Clayton was confirmed by the United States Senate on March 4, 1958, and received his commission on March 12, 1958. He served as Chief Judge from 1966 to 1967. Clayton's service was terminated on November 23, 1967, due to elevation to the Fifth Circuit.

On October 16, 1967, President Lyndon B. Johnson nominated Clayton to a new seat on the United States Court of Appeals for the Fifth Circuit created by 80 Stat. 75. He was confirmed by the Senate on October 26, 1967, and received his commission the following day. He served until his death on July 4, 1969.

== Sources ==
Legal offices
Preceded by Elijah Allen Cox	Judge of the United States District Court for the Northern District of Mississippi; 1958–1967	Succeeded by Orma Rinehart Smith
Preceded by Office established	Chief Judge of the United States District Court for the Northern District of Mississippi; 1966–1967	Succeeded by William Colbert Keady
Preceded by Seat established by 80 Stat. 75	Judge of the United States Court of Appeals for the Fifth Circuit; 1967–1969	Succeeded by Charles Clark
