= George Guerieri =

American military officer and politician

Member of the Mississippi State Senate from the 1st district
- In office January 1980 – January 7, 1992
- Succeeded by: George Ready

Personal details
- Born: George Edward Guerieri; August 1, 1927 South Plainfield, New Jersey
- Died: February 25, 2014 (aged 86) Anniston, Alabama
- Party: Democratic
- Spouse: Jewel Abel

Military service
- Allegiance: United States
- Branch/service: United States Navy; United States Army
- Rank: Lieutenant colonel
- Battles/wars: World War II; Korean War; Vietnam War

George Edward Guerieri Sr. (August 1, 1927 – February 25, 2014) was an American military officer and politician.

Born in South Plainfield, New Jersey, Guerieri served as a sailor on a hospital ship during World War II, and then served in the U.S. Army during the Korean War and Vietnam War, where he was highly decorated and retired a colonel. Guerieri also worked in the United States Chief of Staff office at The Pentagon. Guerieri's military decorations include the Army Legion of Merit and the Vietnam Cross of Gallantry with Silver Star, among many others.

Guerieri served in the Mississippi State Senate from 1980 to 1992 as a member of the conservative wing of the Democratic Party. In the Senate Guerieri authored the first state Racketeering laws in the United States, and was recognized by President Reagan.

Guerieri served as chairman of the Military Order of World Wars’ Memphis Chapter and the President of the Southaven Rotary Club, as well as President of Christ the King Catholic Church's Parish Council and Knights of Columbus.

Guerieri died in Anniston, Alabama at age 86. He was described as a leader of men, true patriot and committed husband, father and grandfather.
