= George C. Carlson Jr. =

American judge

George Clarence Carlson Jr. (born May 23, 1946) is a former justice of the Supreme Court of Mississippi. He served on the court from 2001 to 2013, serving as chief justice for part of that tenure.

== Biography ==
Born in Greenwood, Leflore County, Mississippi, Carlson graduated from South Panola High School in 1964, Mississippi State University in 1969, University of Mississippi School of Law in 1972, and National Judicial College at University of Nevada in Reno in October 1982.

He was appointed to the state supreme court by Governor Ronnie Musgrove, to a seat vacated by the resignation of Michael P. Mills.

== See also ==
- List of justices of the Supreme Court of Mississippi

Political offices
Preceded by Michael P. Mills	Justice of the Supreme Court of Mississippi; 2001–2013	Succeeded by Josiah D. Coleman
