= Neal Brooks Biggers Jr. =

American judge (1935–2023)

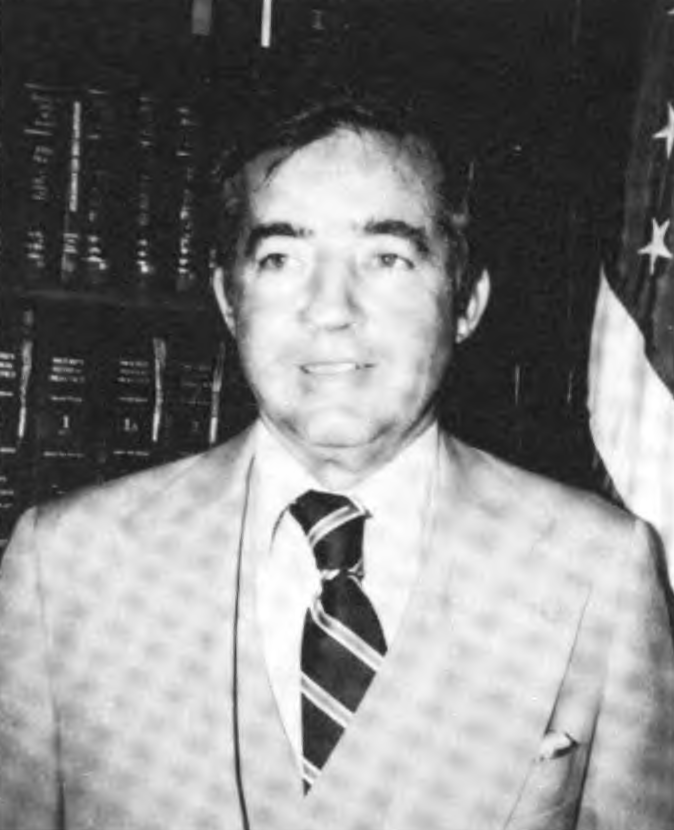

Senior Judge of the United States District Court for the Northern District of Mississippi
- In office October 1, 2000 – October 15, 2023

Chief Judge of the United States District Court for the Northern District of Mississippi
- In office 1998–2000
- Preceded by: Lyonel Thomas Senter Jr.
- Succeeded by: Glen H. Davidson

Judge of the United States District Court for the Northern District of Mississippi
- In office March 28, 1984 – October 1, 2000
- Appointed by: Ronald Reagan
- Preceded by: William Colbert Keady
- Succeeded by: Michael P. Mills

Personal details
- Born: July 1, 1935 Corinth, Mississippi, U.S.
- Died: October 15, 2023 (aged 88) Oxford, Mississippi, U.S
- Education: Millsaps College (BA); University of Mississippi (JD)

Neal Brooks Biggers Jr. (July 1, 1935 – October 15, 2023) was a United States district judge of the United States District Court for the Northern District of Mississippi.

== Education and career ==
Born in Corinth, Mississippi, Biggers received a Bachelor of Arts degree from Millsaps College in 1956 and was in the United States Navy from 1956 to 1960, achieving the rank of Lieutenant. He received a Juris Doctor from the University of Mississippi School of Law in 1963. He was in private practice in Corinth from 1963 to 1968. He was a prosecuting attorney of Alcorn County, Mississippi in 1964, and was a district attorney of First Judicial District, Mississippi from 1968 to 1975. He was also an assistant instructor at the University of Mississippi in 1974. He was a circuit judge for the First Judicial District of Mississippi from 1975 to 1984, serving as a special commissioner for the Mississippi Supreme Court from 1980 to 1981.

=== Federal judicial service ===
On March 1, 1984, Biggers was nominated by President Ronald Reagan to a seat on the United States District Court for the Northern District of Mississippi vacated by Judge William Colbert Keady. Biggers was confirmed by the United States Senate on March 27, 1984, and received his commission on March 28, 1984. He served as Chief Judge from 1998 to 2000. He assumed senior status on October 1, 2000. His service was terminated on October 15, 2023, due to death.

== Death ==
Neal Brooks Biggers Jr. died in Oxford, Mississippi on October 15, 2023, at the age of 88.

== Sources ==
Legal offices
Preceded by William Colbert Keady	Judge of the United States District Court for the Northern District of Mississippi; 1984–2000	Succeeded by Michael P. Mills
Preceded by Lyonel Thomas Senter Jr.	Chief Judge of the United States District Court for the Northern District of Mississippi; 1998–2000	Succeeded by Glen H. Davidson
