= Henry Mentz =

American judge

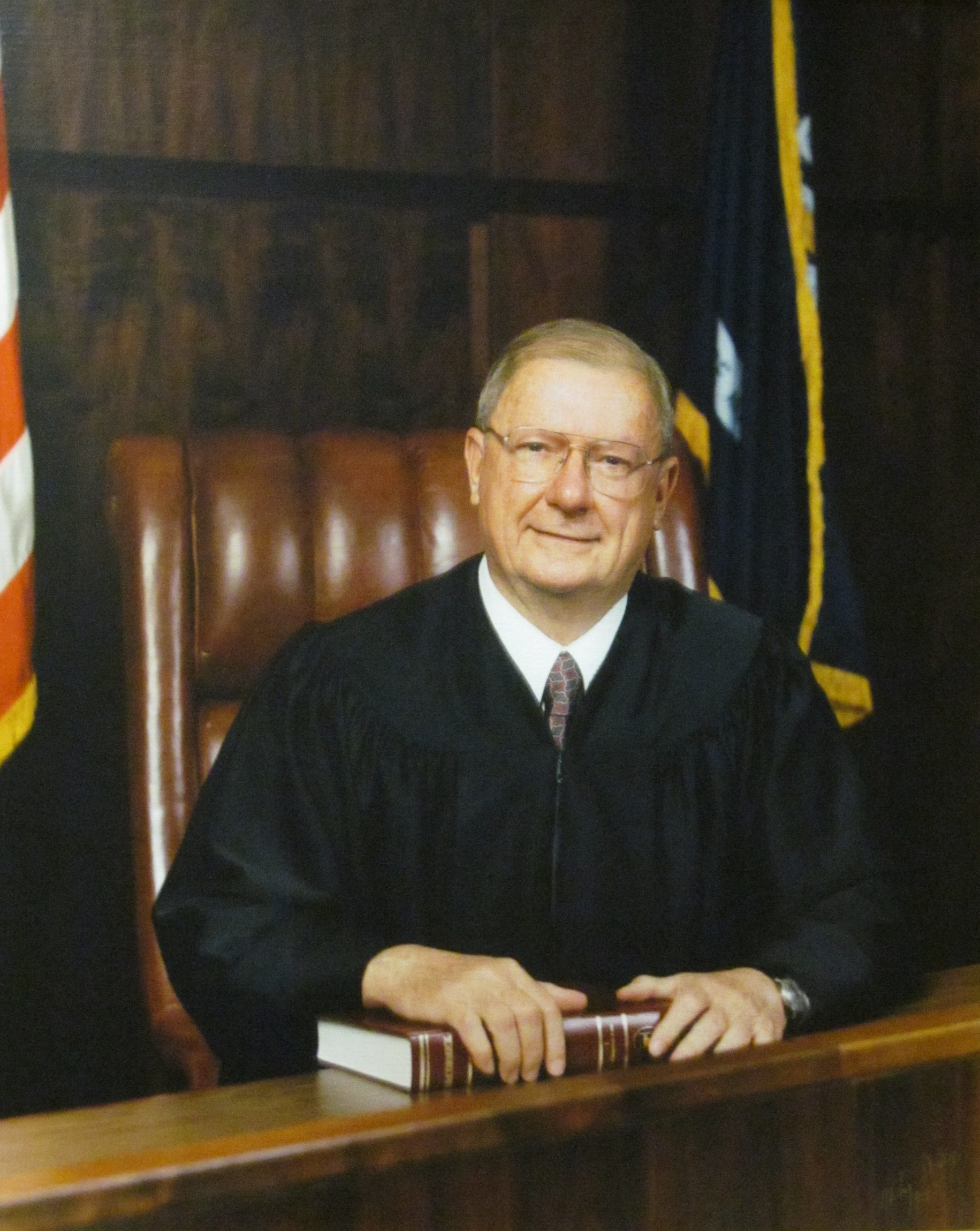

Senior Judge of the United States District Court for the Eastern District of Louisiana
- In office July 1, 1992 – December 31, 2001

Judge of the United States District Court for the Eastern District of Louisiana
- In office June 25, 1982 – July 1, 1992
- Appointed by: Ronald Reagan
- Preceded by: Lansing Leroy Mitchell
- Succeeded by: Sarah S. Vance

Personal details
- Born: Henry Alvan Mentz Jr. November 10, 1920 New Orleans, Louisiana
- Died: January 23, 2005 (aged 84) New Orleans, Louisiana
- Education: Tulane University (BA); Paul M. Hebert Law Center (LLB)

Henry Alvan Mentz Jr. (November 10, 1920 – January 23, 2005) was a United States district judge of the United States District Court for the Eastern District of Louisiana.

== Education and career ==
Born on November 10, 1920, in New Orleans, Louisiana, Mentz received a Bachelor of Arts degree from Tulane University in 1941 and a Bachelor of Laws from the Paul M. Hebert Law Center at Louisiana State University in 1943. He worked in private practice in New Orleans in 1943. He served in the United States Army from 1943 to 1946. He served in private practice in Hammond, Louisiana from 1946 to 1982. Concurrent with his private practice, he served as a staff attorney for the Shell Oil Company from 1947 to 1948, as an assistant to the executive counsel to the Governor of Louisiana in 1948 and as the city attorney of Hammond from 1954 to 1961.

== Federal judicial service ==
Mentz was nominated by President Ronald Reagan on June 2, 1982, to a seat on the United States District Court for the Eastern District of Louisiana vacated by Judge Lansing Leroy Mitchell. He was confirmed by the United States Senate on June 24, 1982, and received commission on June 25, 1982. He assumed senior status on July 1, 1992. His service terminated on December 31, 2001, due to retirement.

== Death ==
Mentz died on January 23, 2005, in New Orleans.

== Sources ==
Legal offices
Preceded by Lansing Leroy Mitchell	Judge of the United States District Court for the Eastern District of Louisiana; 1982–1992	Succeeded by Sarah S. Vance
