= Samuel F. Butterworth =

American lawyer

- Born: Samuel Fowler Butterworth; November 1811; Newburg, New York, US
- Died: May 6, 1875 (aged 63); San Francisco, California, US
- Education: Union College (1833)
- Political party: Democratic Party

Samuel Fowler Butterworth (November 1811 – May 6, 1875) was an American attorney, businessman, and honorary regent of the University of California.

== Background ==
After graduating from Union College, Butterworth became a lawyer working under fellow future regent Edward Tompkins. Butterworth moved to Mississippi to practice law. He was appointed United States Attorney for the Northern District of Mississippi during the administration on Martin van Buren. In 1840 Butterworth was involved in a lawsuit against himself and his business partner John D. Amis. The laws of Mississippi at the time forbade a writ of error in regards to the mandatory payment of a bond by the partners of a real estate bank on Columbus, Mississippi which Butterworth and Amis argued increased the costs of business unlawfully. The case went to the United States Supreme Court and decided in the partners' favor. Butterworth refused appointment to be a justice of Mississippi's Supreme Court in order to instead enter politics. In 1857 Butterworth became the first superintendent of the United States Assay Office in New York City where he lobbied for the creation of a branch mint in New York City.

=== California ===
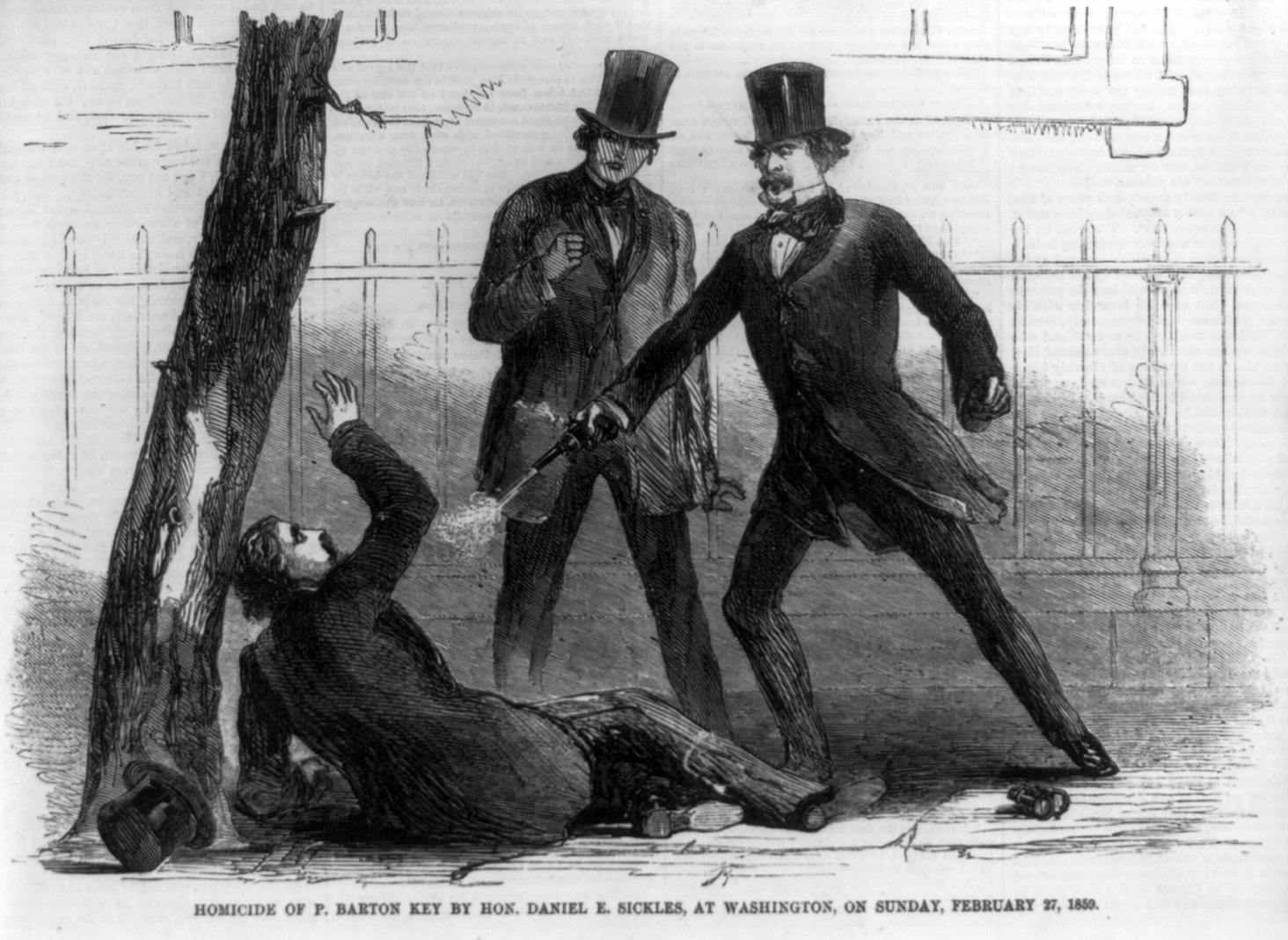
Butterworth doing nothing to stop Daniel Sickles from fatally shootting Philip Key in 1859.

Butterworth was president of the Quicksilver Mining Company (QSMC) of New York, which sought the New Almaden Mine near San Jose, California. In August 1863, Butterworth resigned his position as QSMC President and moved to California to become general manager of the company's newly acquired the New Almaden mine, receiving an annual salary of US$25,000 (equivalent to $653,716 in 2025). Under Butterworth's leadership the security and efficiency of the mine improved and profits increased. During the Civil War some of the mining camp's inhabitants formed a militia, the New Almaden Cavalry. Butterworth disallowed the militia from storing weapons on company property. Butterworth retired in July 1870, succeeded by James Butterworth Randol, his nephew. In 1869 Butterworth was one of the investors behind hydraulic mining outfit North Bloomfield Gravel Mining Company in Nevada County, California. He served as president of the company until his death. Butterworth was elected to the University of California Board of Regents for the term of 1868 to 1876 but he resigned in 1873. Butterworth was an advocate for eliminating the university's fees and giving female students the same opportunities as male students. Butterworth was also a commissioner of Golden Gate Park.
