= Mississippi Chancery Courts =

Part of the Courts of Mississippi

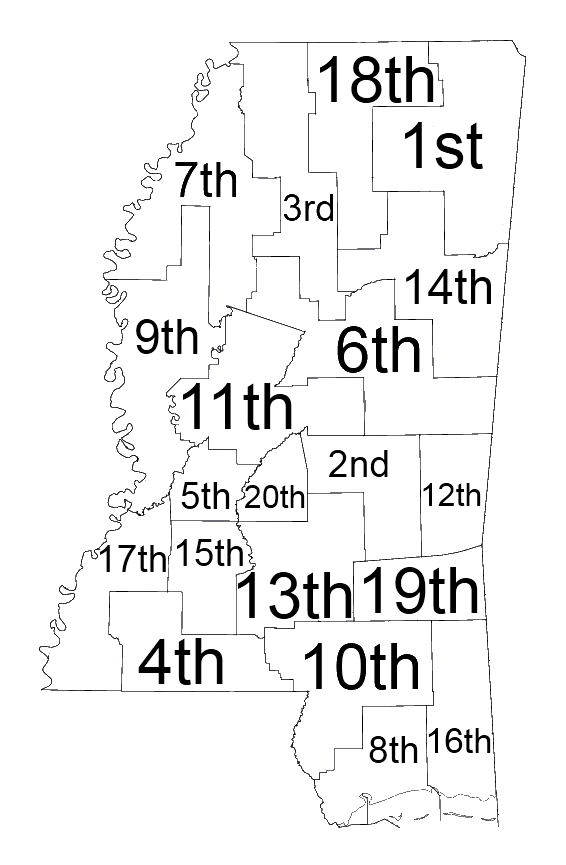
Map of Chancery Court districts

Mississippi Chancery Courts are courts of equity. They also have jurisdiction over family law, sanity hearings, wills, and constitutional law. In counties with no County Court, they have jurisdiction over juveniles. Typically, trials are heard without a jury, but juries are permitted. There are 20 districts.

== Elections ==
Judges in Mississippi Chancery Courts are elected every four years in a nonpartisan election. Judges are required to have five years of experience as a practicing attorney, to be at least 26 years old, to have lived in Mississippi for at least five years, and to live within the court's district.

== Districts ==
Mississippi Chancery Courts are divided into the following 20 districts.

District	Counties covered
1st	Alcorn, Itawamba, Monroe, Pontotoc, Prentiss, Lee, Tishomingo, Union
2nd	Jasper, Newton, Scott
3rd	Desoto, Grenada, Montgomery, Panola, Tate, Yalobusha
4th	Amite, Franklin, Pike, Walthall
5th	Hinds
6th	Attala, Carroll, Choctaw, Kemper, Neshoba, Winston
7th	Bolivar, Coahoma, Leflore, Quitman, Tallahatchie, Tunica
8th	Hancock, Harrison, Stone
9th	Humphreys, Issaquena, Sharkey, Sunflower, Warren, Washington
10th	Forrest, Lamar, Marion, Pearl River, Perry
11th	Holmes, Leake, Madison, Yazoo
12th	Clarke, Lauderdale
13th	Covington, Jefferson Davis, Lawrence, Simpson, Smith
14th	Chickasaw, Clay, Lowndes, Noxubee, Oktibbeha, Webster
15th	Copiah, Lincoln
16th	George, Greene, Jackson
17th	Adams, Claiborne, Jefferson, Wilkinson
18th	Benton, Calhoun, Lafayette, Marshall, Tippah
19th	Jones, Wayne
20th	Rankin

== See also ==
- Courts of Mississippi
- The Summons, a novel about a Chancery Court judge
