= Sarah Frances Hardy =

American artist and author/illustrator (born 1969)

- Education: Davidson College, University of Mississippi School of Law
- Occupations: Writer, illustrator, artist
- Writing career
- Genre: Children's picture books
- Website: www.sfhardy.com

Sarah Frances Hardy (born April 28, 1969) is an American artist and author/illustrator, best known for her picture books. Her first book, Puzzled by Pink, was published by Viking Children's Books/Penguin Putnam in 2012.

== Biography ==
Raised in Jackson, Mississippi, Hardy graduated from Davidson College and majored in fine art. During college, she spent two summers at Parsons School of Design in New York City and Paris. After college, she attended the University of Mississippi School of Law and graduated cum laude. Following law school, she worked as a fine artist exhibiting her works in solo and group exhibitions throughout the Southeast and in New York. She switched gears to writing and illustrating children's books to fulfill a lifelong dream of being a published children's author. She currently resides in Oxford, Mississippi.

== Works ==
=== Books ===
Puzzled by Pink (2012) Viking Children's Books
Paint Me! (2014) Sky Pony Press
Dress Me! (2015) Sky Pony Press

=== Paintings ===
Vivid colors are the hallmarks of Sarah Frances's paintings. Her paintings have been exhibited in numerous galleries throughout the Southeast, including an exhibition at a gallery in Soho. Her work attracts numerous big name buyers. Among her biggest admirers is Steve Wynn, who bought many of Frances's paintings for his resort in Biloxi, Mississippi.
