= Bill Hawks =

American politician

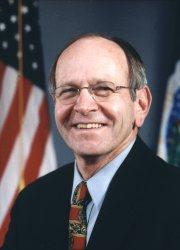

Under Secretary of Agriculture for Marketing and Regulatory Programs
- In office May 24, 2001 – June 2005
- President: George W. Bush
- Succeeded by: Bruce I. Knight

Member of the Mississippi State Senate from the 1st district
- In office January 3, 1995 – January 4, 2000
- Preceded by: George Ready
- Succeeded by: Bobby Chamberlin

Personal details
- Born: William Thomas Hawks; November 22, 1944 (age 81) Oxford, Mississippi, U.S.
- Party: Republican
- Children: 3
- Education: Mississippi State University (BS, MS)

Military service
- Branch/service: United States Army Reserve Mississippi Army National Guard Tennessee Air National Guard

William Thomas Hawks, known as Bill Hawks (born November 22, 1944, near Oxford, Mississippi), is an American politician, former civil servant, agricultural businessman, and founder and CEO of AgWorks Solutions, LLC.

== Early life and education ==
Hawks was born on November 22, 1944, near Oxford, Mississippi. He earned a Bachelor of Science (1968) and Master of Science (1970) in Agricultural Economics from Mississippi State University.

Hawks served in the United States Army Reserve from 1968 to 1970 where he became a corporal, the Mississippi Army National Guard from 1970 to 1972 where he became a sergeant and the Tennessee Air National Guard from 1972 until 1980 where he became a technical sergeant.

== Career ==
Hawks started farming after finishing graduate school by owning and operating a dairy in DeSoto County in northwestern Mississippi. In the early 1970s, he began to lease land from neighbors to get started in a row crop operation

Hawks was the managing partner of Hawks Farming, which farmed approximately 12,000 acres of land in three counties in northern Mississippi. This operation consisted of soybeans, double-cropped winter wheat, corn, cotton, and cattle.

In the late-1980s, Hawks was a part owner in a professional farm management company, Sunbelt Land and Timber Company.

During the early 1990s, Hawks owned and managed Northwest Mississippi Flying Service, an agricultural aerial application service, and owned and operated a recreational airport. The Hawks family also owned DeSoto East, a residential development company.

In December 1994, Hawks was elected to the Mississippi State Senate, representing DeSoto County. During his five years as a state senator, he was a leader on the committees with jurisdiction over agriculture and the environment. In 1999, he was the Republican nominee for Lieutenant Governor of Mississippi.

On May 24, 2001, during the George W. Bush administration, Hawks was sworn in as the Under Secretary of Agriculture for Marketing and Regulatory Programs by United States Secretary of Agriculture Ann Veneman. Hawks resigned from the USDA position in June 2005.

In January 2006, Hawks formed AgWorks Solutions, a Washington, D.C., consulting and government relations firm that specializes in animal health and agriculture-related trade. Since 2010, Hawks has been a member of the American Lumber Standards Board of Review and has served as Chairman since 2015. In 2014, Hawks received the United States Animal Health Association Medal of Distinction.

Throughout his career, he has been active in many agricultural boards and committees such as American Farm Bureau Federation, American Soybean Association, and the National Corn Growers Association.

== Personal life ==
He has three children and is married to the former Robin Desha Lucas.

Party political offices
| Preceded by Eddie Briggs | Republican nominee for Lieutenant Governor of Mississippi; 1999 | Succeeded by Amy Tuck |
