= Lansing Leroy Mitchell =

American judge (1914–2001)

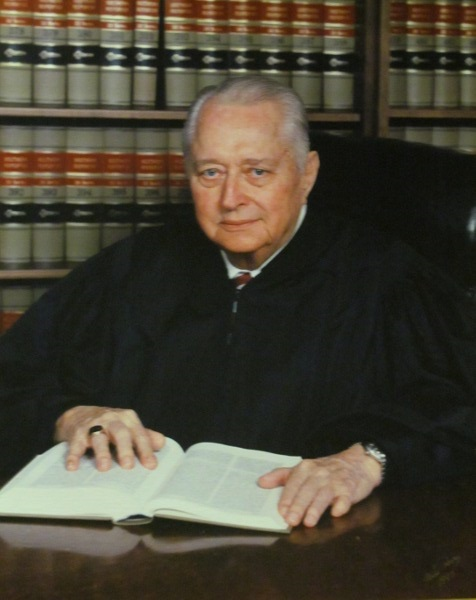

Senior Judge of the United States District Court for the Eastern District of Louisiana
- In office November 3, 1981 – April 24, 2001

Judge of the United States District Court for the Eastern District of Louisiana
- In office November 3, 1966 – November 3, 1981
- Appointed by: Lyndon B. Johnson
- Preceded by: Seat established by 80 Stat. 75
- Succeeded by: Henry Mentz

Personal details
- Born: Lansing Leroy Mitchell; January 17, 1914 Sun, Louisiana
- Died: April 24, 2001 (aged 87) New Orleans, Louisiana
- Education: Louisiana State University (B.A.); Paul M. Hebert Law Center (LL.B.)

Lansing Leroy Mitchell (January 17, 1914 – April 24, 2001) was a United States district judge of the United States District Court for the Eastern District of Louisiana.

== Education and early career ==
Born in Sun, Louisiana, Mitchell received a Bachelor of Arts degree from Louisiana State University in 1934 and a Bachelor of Laws from the Paul M. Hebert Law Center at Louisiana State University in 1937. He was in private practice in Ponchatoula, Louisiana from 1937 to 1938. After that, was a special agent for the Federal Bureau of Investigation from 1938 to 1941. Later he was an attorney with the United States Securities and Exchange Commission from 1941 to 1942. Following that, he was in the United States Army as a Lieutenant Colonel from 1942 to 1946. He also was an Assistant United States Attorney of the Eastern District of Louisiana from 1946 to 1953. Eventually he was in private practice in New Orleans, Louisiana from 1953 to 1966.

== Controversy ==
In the late 1960s, H. Rap Brown, The former head of the Student Nonviolent Coordinating Committee (SNCC), Was convicted of a firearms violation. After the conviction, a lawyer stepped forward with information suggesting that Judge Mitchell, who presided over the trial, harbored a prejudice against Brown. According to his lawyer, Mitchell had said that he was “going to get that n*gger.” At a post-conviction hearing, a new judge found the lawyer statement to be credible, but decided nonetheless to affirm the conviction and sentence. He ruled that notwithstanding the Mitchell’s unfortunate comment, the defendant had had a fair trial. The court of appeals subsequently reversed his decision and vacated Brown’s conviction. In doing so, it relied on a federal statute that requires the mandatory disqualification of a judge “ in any proceeding in which his impartiality might reasonably be questioned or where he has a personal bias or prejudice concerning party.” The Court of Appeals emphasize that the trial judge's remark had undercut the appearance of impartiality. It also concluded that it could not suitably determine from Mitchell’s remark whether or not the defendant had received a fair trial.

Despite these revelations, Judge Mitchell was not reprimanded or removed from the bench and continued to serve until his death in 2001.

== Federal judicial service ==
Mitchell was nominated by President Lyndon B. Johnson on October 6, 1966, to the United States District Court for the Eastern District of Louisiana, to a new seat created by 80 Stat. 75. He was confirmed by the United States Senate on October 20, 1966, and received his commission on November 3, 1966. He assumed senior status on November 3, 1981. Mitchell served in that capacity until his death on April 24, 2001, in New Orleans.

== Sources ==
Legal offices
Preceded by Seat established by 80 Stat. 75	Judge of the United States District Court for the Eastern District of Louisiana; 1966–1981	Succeeded by Henry Mentz
