= William Colbert Keady =

American judge

Senior Judge of the United States District Court for the Northern District of Mississippi
- In office April 26, 1983 – June 16, 1989

Chief Judge of the United States District Court for the Northern District of Mississippi
- In office 1968–1982
- Preceded by: Claude Feemster Clayton
- Succeeded by: Lyonel Thomas Senter Jr.

Judge of the United States District Court for the Northern District of Mississippi
- In office April 4, 1968 – April 26, 1983
- Appointed by: Lyndon B. Johnson
- Preceded by: Seat established by 80 Stat. 75
- Succeeded by: Neal Brooks Biggers Jr.

Personal details
- Born: William Colbert Keady; April 2, 1913 Greenville, Mississippi, U.S.
- Died: June 16, 1989 (aged 76) Jackson, Mississippi, U.S.
- Education: Washington University School of Law (LL.B.)

William Colbert Keady (April 2, 1913 – June 16, 1989) was a United States district judge of the United States District Court for the Northern District of Mississippi. Keady is best known for his role in the landmark court case, Gates v. Collier.

== Early life ==
William Colbert Keady was born on April 2, 1913, in Greensville, Mississippi. His parents were Mary Augusta and Michael John Keady. William was the youngest of five children and born with a severe physical handicap; his right arm was extremely deformed with no right forearm and hand. However, Keady learned to adapt, often playing tennis with his friend, William Alexander Percy, and collecting stamps in his free time. Percy was a planter, poet, and attorney.

Keady attended Greenville High School. His mother died on his sixteenth birthday, and his father died roughly two years later. Despite these losses, Keady persevered and decided to further his education.

== Education and career ==
In 1931, Keady began attending Washington University in St. Louis Law School on a scholarship. In 1935, he married his high school sweetheart, Dorothy Thompson. A year after getting married, they moved to Greensville, where Keady accepted a job as clerk in the firm of Percy and Farish. In 1937, he and his wife had a son, William Keady Jr. A few years later, in 1941, their daughter Peggy Anne was born.

Though Keady went through phases of politics, he eventually chose to focus his legal career on becoming a federal judge. In 1940, voters in Washington County, Mississippi, elected him as a state representative. In 1944, they elected him as a state senator. Keady served as a delegate at the 1940, 1944, and 1960 Democratic National Conventions, but decided to take a step back from state legislature to focus on his legal practice.

Keady considered himself a traditionalist when it came to politics and race; however, he believed that racial integration was inevitable and should be accepted. He struggled with his position as judge sometimes, saying, “I am not a crusader, it was never my intention to strike dramatic reforms but to advocate gradualism." The types of issues that came to his court included voting rights, school desegregation, racial and sexual bias in jury selection, etc. A local attorney said, “He was someone the minorities in this state could turn to and know that the Constitution was alive and well."

== Federal judicial service ==
On March 26, 1968, Keady was nominated by President Lyndon B. Johnson to a new seat on the United States District Court for the Northern District of Mississippi created by 80 Stat. 75. He was confirmed by the United States Senate on April 3, 1968, and received his commission on April 4, 1968. He served as Chief Judge from 1968 to 1982, and assumed senior status on April 26, 1983. Keady served in that capacity until his death in Jackson, Mississippi, on June 16, 1989, at age 76.

As a federal judge, Keady enforced desegregation plans that were favored by the Supreme Court and the Fifth Circuit Court of Appeals. He believed “Jim Crow in education simply had to go." Keady was respected by lawyers for his intelligence and “even-handed demeanor,” though he didn't get much media attention until 1972, when he covered what is now a landmark court case, Gates v. Collier.

== Gates v. Collier ==
Keady is most widely known for his role in the US District Court case, Gates v. Collier.

On February 8, 1971, Nazareth Gates, Willie Holmes, Matthew Winter, and Hal Zachery filed a class action against the Superintendent of the Penitentiary, the members of the Mississippi Penitentiary Board and the Governor of the State. Judge William Keady decided the case qualified as a class action under federal guidelines. This meant the outcome would cover all inmates in the prison rather than just the four testifying. Another important thing Keady did was add a subclass of black convicts, since racial discrimination had been a key characteristic of Mississippi State Penitentiary since it was founded in 1904.

The Mississippi Delta's penitentiary, Parchman Farm, serves as a vital depiction of racial brutality in America post-Civil war. Parchman is known as “... the quintessential penal farm, the closest thing to slavery that survived the Civil War."

Keady visited Parchman on multiple occasions and took his minister with him. At every camp, he saw, “filthy bathrooms, rotting mattresses, polluted water supplies, and kitchens overrun with insects, rodents, and the stench of decay." Keady said, “One part of me had always suspected such things. The rest of me was angry and ashamed."

In court, Keady said, “The record is replete with innumerable instances of physical brutality and abuse in disciplining inmates who are sent to MSU. They include… handcuffing inmates to the fence and to cells for long periods of time, shooting at and around inmates and using a cattle prod to keep them standing or moving."

In October 1972, Keady found for the plaintiffs, condemning Parchman as unconstitutional, and an outrage to “modern standards of decency." Keady believed that “its failure to provide adequate housing, medical care, and physical protection” violated the Eighth Amendment’s prohibition against cruel and unusual punishment." He also concluded that the policy of segregating inmates by race violated the Equal Protection Clause of the Fourteenth Amendment. He followed these findings with an order for “immediate and long-range relief."

The state of Mississippi ended up appealing Keady's decision to the Fifth Circuit Court of Appeals. This turned Gates v. Collier into a landmark case, taking place in September 1974. The Fifth Circuit ended up agreeing with the lower court's earlier decision, resulting in the abolishment of racial segregation of inmates as well as the trusty system.

== Legacy ==
Keady died in a Jackson hospital on June 16, 1989, at age 76. The Clarion-Ledger described him as a man of “vision and courage in the ranks of the federal judiciary” who “shaped a better Mississippi."

== Sources ==
Legal offices
| Preceded by Seat established by 80 Stat. 75 | Judge of the United States District Court for the Northern District of Mississippi; 1968–1983 | Succeeded by Neal Brooks Biggers Jr. |
| Preceded by Claude Feemster Clayton | Chief Judge of the United States District Court for the Northern District of Mississippi; 1968–1982 | Succeeded by Lyonel Thomas Senter Jr. |
