= Glen H. Davidson =

American judge (born 1941)

Senior Judge of the United States District Court for the Northern District of Mississippi
- Incumbent
- Assumed office June 1, 2007

Chief Judge of the United States District Court for the Northern District of Mississippi
- In office 2000–2007
- Preceded by: Neal Brooks Biggers Jr.
- Succeeded by: Michael P. Mills

Judge of the United States District Court for the Northern District of Mississippi
- In office October 17, 1985 – June 1, 2007
- Appointed by: Ronald Reagan
- Preceded by: Seat established by 98 Stat. 333
- Succeeded by: Sharion Aycock

Personal details
- Born: November 20, 1941 (age 84) Pontotoc, Mississippi, U.S.
- Spouse: Bonnie Davidson
- Children: 2
- Education: University of Mississippi (BA, JD)

Glen H. Davidson (born November 20, 1941) is a senior United States district judge of the United States District Court for the Northern District of Mississippi.

== Education and career ==
Davidson was born in Pontotoc, Mississippi. He received a Bachelor of Arts degree from the University of Mississippi in 1962 and a Juris Doctor from the University of Mississippi School of Law in 1965. He was a city prosecutor for Tupelo, Mississippi, in 1965. He was a United States Air Force captain, JAG Corps from 1966 to 1969, thereafter entering private practice in Tupelo from 1969 to 1981. He was an assistant district attorney of First Judicial District of Mississippi from 1969 to 1974 and a district attorney of First Judicial District of Mississippi in 1975. He was the United States attorney for the Northern District of Mississippi from 1981 to 1985.

=== Federal judicial service ===
On July 23, 1985, Davidson was nominated by President Ronald Reagan to a new seat on the United States District Court for the Northern District of Mississippi created by 98 Stat. 333. He was confirmed by the United States Senate on October 17, 1985, and received his commission on October 17, 1985. He served as Chief Judge from 2000 to 2007, assuming senior status on June 1, 2007.

== Sources ==
Legal offices
Preceded by Seat established by 98 Stat. 333	Judge of the United States District Court for the Northern District of Mississippi; 1985–2007	Succeeded by Sharion Aycock
Preceded by Neal Brooks Biggers Jr.	Chief Judge of the United States District Court for the Northern District of Mississippi; 2000–2007	Succeeded by Michael P. Mills
