= Elijah Allen Cox =

American judge

Senior Judge of the United States District Court for the Northern District of Mississippi
- In office March 22, 1957 – August 28, 1974

Judge of the United States District Court for the Northern District of Mississippi
- In office March 2, 1929 – March 22, 1957
- Appointed by: Calvin Coolidge
- Preceded by: Seat established by 45 Stat. 1422
- Succeeded by: Claude Feemster Clayton

Personal details
- Born: Elijah Allen Cox; February 16, 1887 Baldwyn, Mississippi
- Died: August 28, 1974 (aged 87) Aberdeen, Mississippi
- Spouse: Louise Norvell Jones (married 1919)
- Parents: William M. Cox (father); Forest Allen (mother)
- Education: Vanderbilt University (B.A.) read law

Elijah Allen Cox or Allen Cox (February 16, 1887 – August 28, 1974) was a United States district judge of the United States District Court for the Northern District of Mississippi.

== Education and career ==
Cox was born in Baldwyn, Mississippi. He attended McTyeire School in McKenzie, Tennessee and received a Bachelor of Arts degree from Vanderbilt University in 1909. He read law in 1911 to enter the bar. He was in private practice in Baldwyn from 1911 to 1924, interrupted by service in the United States Army during World War I. In the summer of 1917, he went to Officer Training Camp at Fort Logan H. Roots, Arkansas. He was a Chancellor of the First Chancery Court of Mississippi from 1924 to 1929.

== Federal judicial service ==
On March 1, 1929, Cox was nominated by President Calvin Coolidge to a new seat on the United States District Court for the Northern District of Mississippi created by 45 Stat. 1422. He was confirmed by the United States Senate on March 2, 1929, and received his commission the same day. He assumed senior status on March 22, 1957, and served in that capacity until his death on August 28, 1974.

== Later life ==
He was buried at Baldwyn Masonic Cemetery, Baldwyn, Mississippi.

== See also ==
- List of United States federal judges by longevity of service

== Sources ==
Legal offices
Preceded by Seat established by 45 Stat. 1422	Judge of the United States District Court for the Northern District of Mississippi; 1929–1957	Succeeded by Claude Feemster Clayton
