= George Ready =

American lawyer and politician

Member of the Mississippi State Senate from the 1st district
- In office January 7, 1992 – November 16, 1994
- Preceded by: George Guerieri
- Succeeded by: Bill Hawks

Personal details
- Born: George Banks Ready; July 2, 1957 (age 69) Meridian, Mississippi, U.S.
- Party: Democratic
- Spouse: Amanda Mahla (m. 1985)
- Education: University of Mississippi

George Banks Ready (born July 2, 1957) is an American attorney and politician who served as a member of the Mississippi State Senate. Winning election as a Democrat in 1991, he resigned from the Senate in November 1994, upon winning election as a circuit court judge in DeSoto County. Ready served in this position until 2004, when he left to return to private practice.
