= List of federal judges appointed by Lyndon B. Johnson =

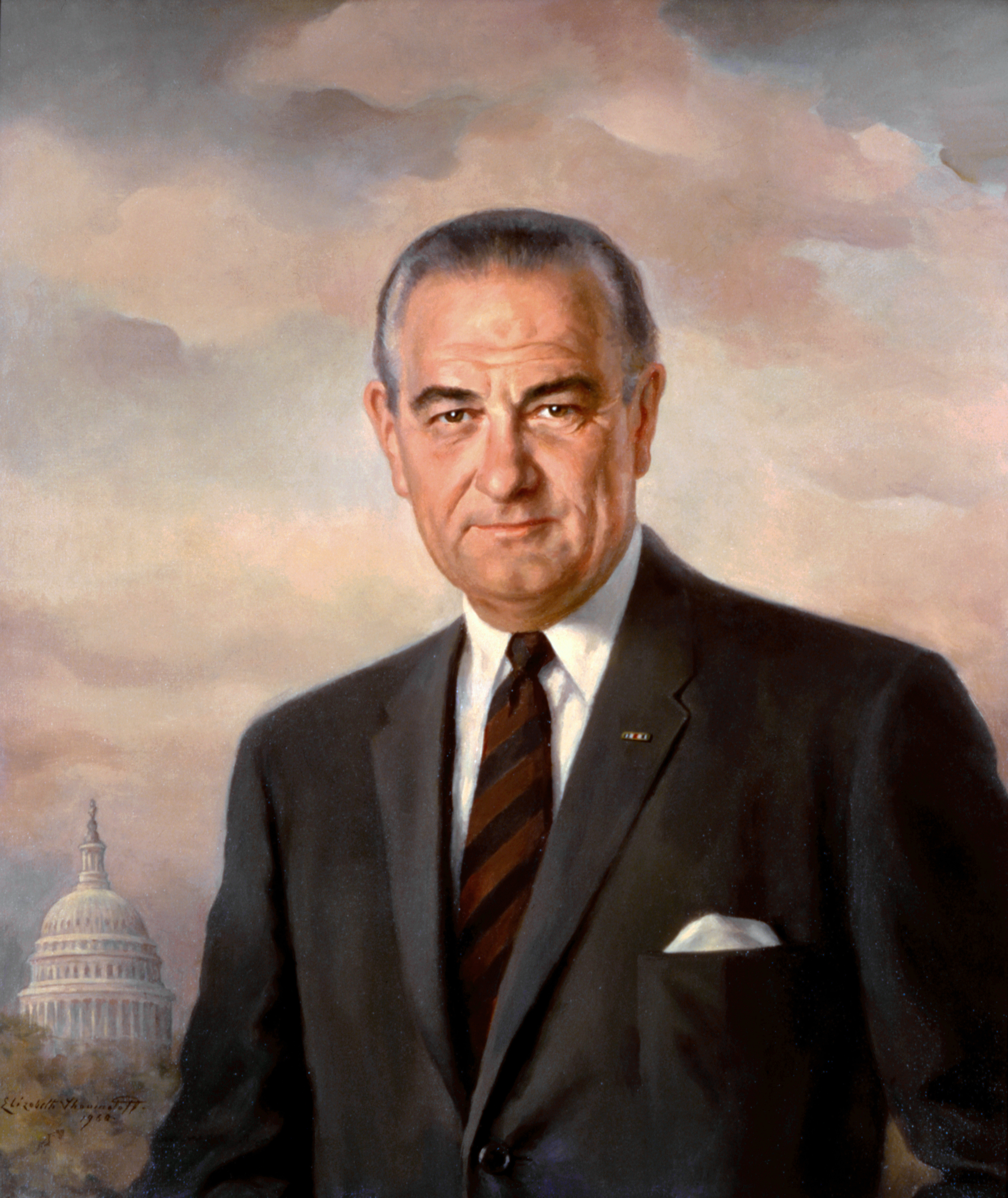
President Lyndon B. Johnson.

Following is a list of all Article III United States federal judges appointed by President Lyndon B. Johnson during his presidency. Johnson appointed 184 Article III federal judges, including 2 Justices to the Supreme Court of the United States, 41 to the United States Courts of Appeals, 128 to the United States district courts, 1 to the United States Court of Customs and Patent Appeals, 4 to the United States Court of Claims and 8 to the United States Customs Court.

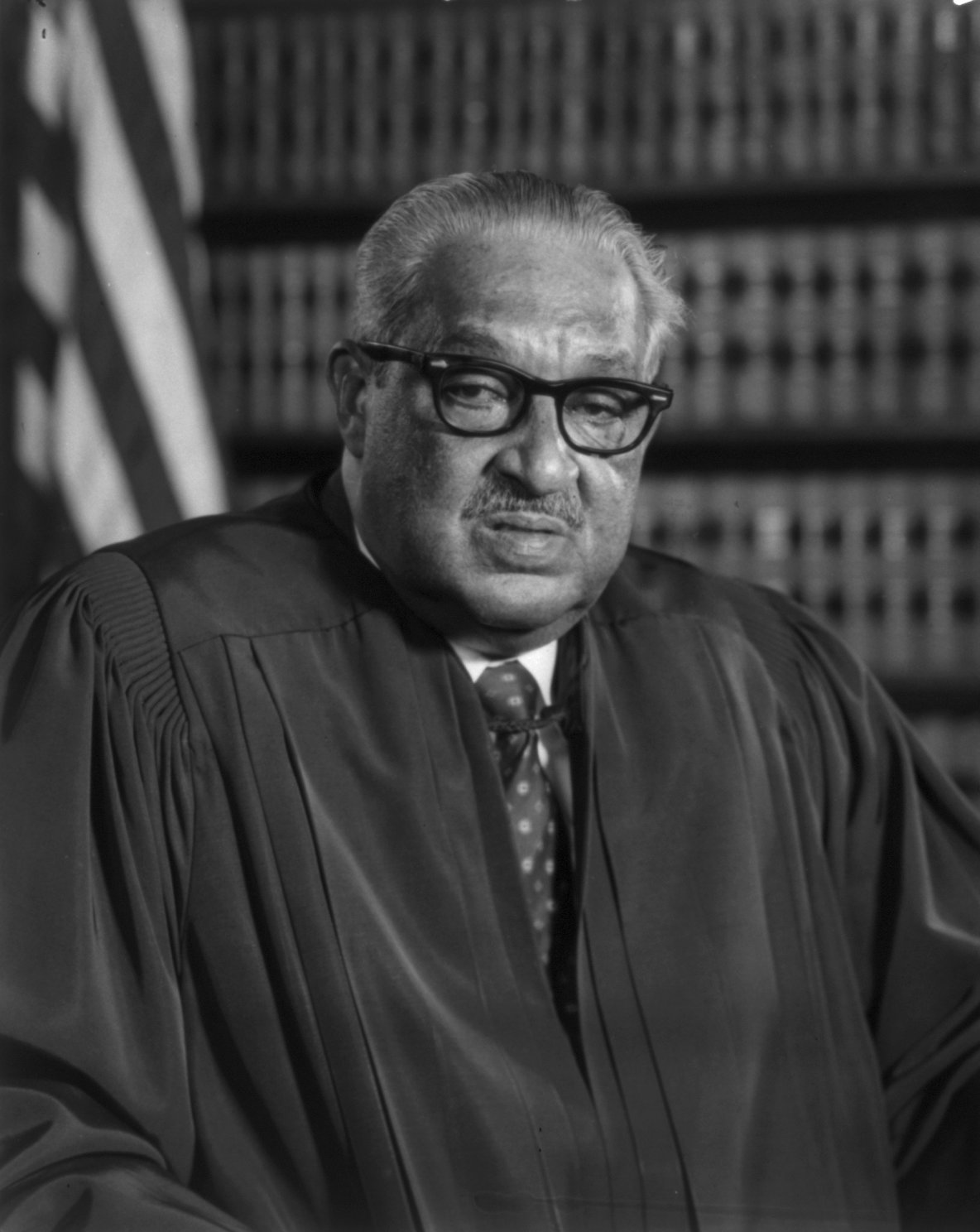
With the appointment of Thurgood Marshall, Johnson placed the first African American on the Supreme Court.

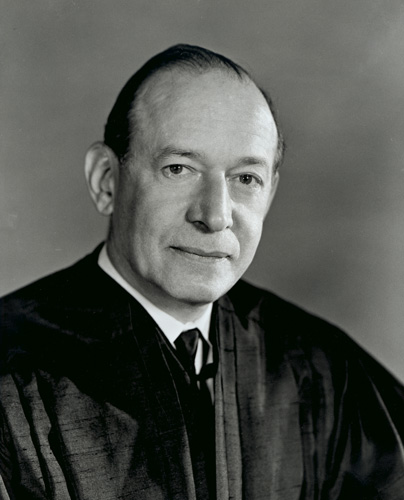
Johnson named Abe Fortas to the Supreme Court, and later made an unsuccessful attempt to elevate Fortas to Chief Justice.

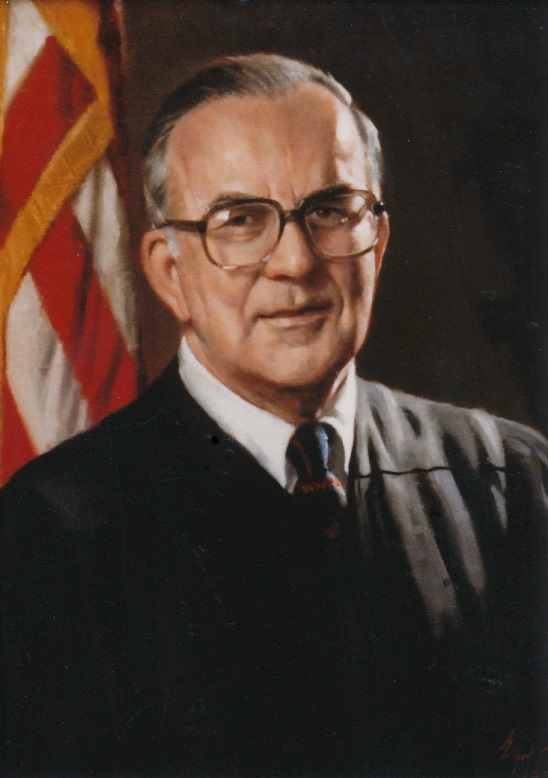
Myron H. Bright, appointed by Johnson to the United States Court of Appeals for the Eighth Circuit, served for 48 years.

== United States Supreme Court justices ==
#	Justice	Seat	State	Former justice	Nomination date	Confirmation date	Confirmation vote	Began active service	Ended active service	Ended retired service
1	Abe Fortas	2	Tennessee	Arthur Goldberg	July 28, 1965	August 11, 1965	voice vote	October 4, 1965	May 14, 1969	–
2	Thurgood Marshall	10	New York	Tom C. Clark	June 13, 1967	August 31, 1967	69–11	October 2, 1967	October 1, 1991	January 24, 1993

== Courts of appeals ==
#	Judge	Circuit	Nomination date	Confirmation date	Began active service	Ended active service	Ended senior status
1	George Clifton Edwards Jr. (Note: Nominated by John F. Kennedy but appointed by Lyndon B. Johnson.)	Sixth	September 9, 1963	December 16, 1963	December 19, 1963	January 15, 1985	April 8, 1995
2	Walter Raleigh Ely Jr.	Ninth	June 5, 1964	July 1, 1964	July 2, 1964	October 31, 1979	October 9, 1984
3	Abraham Lincoln Freedman	Third	April 15, 1964	July 2, 1964	July 2, 1964	March 13, 1971	–
4	Robert P. Anderson	Second	August 4, 1964	August 15, 1964	August 15, 1964	May 1, 1971	May 2, 1978
5	Edward Allen Tamm	D.C.	March 1, 1965	March 11, 1965	March 11, 1965	September 22, 1985	–
6	Harold Leventhal	D.C.	March 1, 1965	April 7, 1965	April 7, 1965	November 20, 1979	–
7	Floyd Robert Gibson	Eighth	May 18, 1965	June 8, 1965	June 8, 1965	December 31, 1979	October 4, 2001
8	Homer Thornberry	Fifth	June 22, 1965	July 1, 1965	July 1, 1965	December 21, 1978	December 12, 1995
9	James P. Coleman	Fifth	June 22, 1965	July 26, 1965	July 26, 1965	May 31, 1981	January 31, 1984
10	Anthony J. Celebrezze	Sixth	July 27, 1965	August 19, 1965	August 19, 1965	October 1, 1980	October 29, 1998
11	Edward McEntee	First	August 3, 1965	August 31, 1965	September 1, 1965	December 31, 1976	February 14, 1981
12	Frank M. Coffin	First	September 15, 1965	October 1, 1965	October 2, 1965	February 1, 1989	December 7, 2009
13	Wilfred Feinberg	Second	October 11, 1965 (Note: Renominated on January 19, 1966.)	March 4, 1966	March 7, 1966	January 31, 1991	July 31, 2014
14	Joe Hickey	Tenth	May 12, 1966	June 9, 1966	June 9, 1966	September 22, 1970	–
15	Collins J. Seitz	Third	February 28, 1966	June 9, 1966	June 9, 1966	June 1, 1989	October 16, 1998
16	Harrison Lee Winter	Fourth	June 13, 1966	June 24, 1966	June 24, 1966	January 1, 1990	April 10, 1990
17	James Braxton Craven Jr.	Fourth	June 13, 1966	June 29, 1966	June 29, 1966	May 3, 1977	–
18	Robert A. Ainsworth Jr.	Fifth	June 28, 1966	July 22, 1966	July 22, 1966	December 22, 1981	–
19	John Cooper Godbold	Fifth / Eleventh	June 28, 1966	July 22, 1966	July 22, 1966	October 23, 1987	December 22, 2009
20	Irving Loeb Goldberg	Fifth	June 28, 1966	July 22, 1966	July 22, 1966	January 31, 1980	February 11, 1995
21	Donald P. Lay	Eighth	July 11, 1966	July 22, 1966	July 22, 1966	January 7, 1992	April 29, 2007
22	John Weld Peck II	Sixth	June 13, 1966	July 22, 1966	July 22, 1966	July 1, 1978	September 7, 1993
23	Walter J. Cummings Jr.	Seventh	July 11, 1966	August 10, 1966	August 11, 1966	April 24, 1999	–
24	Thomas E. Fairchild	Seventh	July 11, 1966	August 10, 1966	August 11, 1966	August 31, 1981	February 12, 2007
25	David W. Dyer	Fifth / Eleventh	August 16, 1966	August 25, 1966	August 25, 1966	September 30, 1976	June 7, 1998
26	Wade H. McCree	Sixth	August 16, 1966	September 7, 1966	September 7, 1966	March 28, 1977	–
27	Gerald Heaney	Eighth	September 9, 1966	October 20, 1966	November 3, 1966	December 31, 1988	August 31, 2006
28	Spottswood William Robinson III	D.C.	October 6, 1966	October 20, 1966	November 3, 1966	September 1, 1989	October 11, 1998
29	John Milton Bryan Simpson	Fifth / Eleventh	October 11, 1966	October 20, 1966	November 3, 1966	June 30, 1975	August 22, 1987
30	Bert Combs	Sixth	January 16, 1967	April 5, 1967	April 5, 1967	June 5, 1970	–
31	Francis Lund Van Dusen	Third	January 16, 1967	June 12, 1967	June 12, 1967	May 16, 1977	May 26, 1993
32	John D. Butzner Jr.	Fourth	June 27, 1967	July 31, 1967	July 31, 1967	November 1, 1982	January 20, 2006
33	Claude Feemster Clayton	Fifth	October 16, 1967	October 26, 1967	October 27, 1967	July 4, 1969	–
34	James Marshall Carter	Ninth	November 6, 1967	November 16, 1967	November 16, 1967	September 30, 1971	November 18, 1979
35	Otto Kerner Jr.	Seventh	March 11, 1968	April 11, 1968	April 22, 1968	July 22, 1974	–
36	Myron H. Bright	Eighth	April 25, 1968	June 6, 1968	June 7, 1968	June 1, 1985	December 12, 2016
37	Lewis Render Morgan	Fifth / Eleventh	July 17, 1968	July 25, 1968	July 25, 1968	September 1, 1978	November 15, 2001
38	Ruggero J. Aldisert	Third	July 17, 1968	July 29, 1968	July 29, 1968	December 31, 1986	December 28, 2014
39	Shirley Hufstedler	Ninth	July 17, 1968	September 12, 1968	September 12, 1968	December 5, 1979	–
40	William Judson Holloway Jr.	Tenth	August 2, 1968	September 13, 1968	September 16, 1968	May 31, 1992	April 25, 2014
41	David Henry Stahl	Third	August 2, 1968	October 10, 1968	October 11, 1968	February 21, 1970	–

== District courts ==
#	Judge	Court (Note: See List of United States district and territorial courts)	Nomination date	Confirmation date	Began active service	Ended active service	Ended senior status
1	Charles Henry Tenney (Note: Nominated by John F. Kennedy but appointed by Lyndon B. Johnson.)	S.D.N.Y.	July 22, 1963	December 5, 1963	December 12, 1963	January 31, 1979	November 11, 1994
2	Homer Thornberry	W.D. Tex.	July 9, 1963	July 15, 1963	December 17, 1963	July 2, 1965	Elevated
3	Spottswood William Robinson III (Note: Initially nominated by John F. Kennedy but renominated by Lyndon B. Johnson.)	D.D.C.	October 1, 1963 (Note: Renominated on February 3, 1964.)	July 1, 1964	January 6, 1964	November 8, 1966	Elevated
4	A. Leon Higginbotham Jr.	E.D. Pa.	September 25, 1963 (Note: Renominated on January 6, 1964.)	March 14, 1964	January 6, 1964	November 7, 1977	Elevated
5	John Morgan Davis	E.D. Pa.	September 3, 1963	March 14, 1964	January 7, 1964	May 6, 1974	March 8, 1984
6	David Rabinovitz	W.D. Wis.	September 6, 1963	–	January 7, 1964	October 3, 1964	–
7	Howard C. Bratton	D.N.M.	March 3, 1964	March 14, 1964	March 17, 1964	February 4, 1987	May 5, 2002
8	Robert W. Hemphill	E.D.S.C. W.D.S.C. / D.S.C.	April 15, 1964	April 30, 1964	April 30, 1964	May 10, 1980	December 25, 1983
9	Sidney Lee Christie	N.D. W. Va. S.D. W. Va.	April 15, 1964	April 30, 1964	May 1, 1964	February 15, 1974	–
10	Raymond Clyne McNichols	D. Idaho	April 15, 1964	April 30, 1964	May 1, 1964	July 1, 1981	December 25, 1985
11	Charles Earl Simons Jr.	E.D.S.C. / D.S.C.	April 15, 1964	April 30, 1964	May 1, 1964	August 17, 1986	October 26, 1999
12	Eugene Andrew Gordon	M.D.N.C.	April 30, 1964	May 27, 1964	June 9, 1964	July 12, 1982	May 4, 2002
13	Edmund Port	N.D.N.Y.	April 30, 1964	July 1, 1964	July 2, 1964	February 7, 1976	March 2, 1986
14	Dorwin Wallace Suttle	W.D. Tex.	April 11, 1964	June 30, 1964	July 2, 1964	October 10, 1979	September 29, 2001
15	Robert C. Zampano	D. Conn.	August 4, 1964	August 15, 1964	August 15, 1964	June 1, 1977	April 1, 1994
16	Gerald Joseph Weber	W.D. Pa.	April 30, 1964	September 15, 1964	September 15, 1964	December 31, 1988	August 28, 1989
17	Francis C. Whelan	S.D. Cal. / C.D. Cal.	August 17, 1964	September 15, 1964	September 15, 1964	January 7, 1978	August 22, 1991
18	Charles Andrew Muecke	D. Ariz.	August 17, 1964	September 29, 1964	October 1, 1964	November 30, 1984	September 21, 2007
19	Orville Edwin Langley	E.D. Okla.	January 7, 1965	January 26, 1965	January 27, 1965	September 12, 1973	–
20	Howard Francis Corcoran	D.D.C.	March 1, 1965	March 11, 1965	March 11, 1965	November 30, 1977	May 11, 1989
21	James Edward Doyle	W.D. Wis.	April 29, 1965	May 21, 1965	May 22, 1965	July 7, 1980	April 1, 1987
22	Don John Young	N.D. Ohio	April 5, 1965	May 21, 1965	May 22, 1965	July 1, 1980	May 10, 1996
23	Irving Hill	S.D. Cal. / C.D. Cal.	May 18, 1965	June 9, 1965	June 10, 1965	October 15, 1980	March 18, 1998
24	Fred Joseph Nichol	D.S.D.	May 18, 1965	June 9, 1965	June 10, 1965	June 11, 1980	December 31, 1996
25	James Fleming Gordon	W.D. Ky.	June 24, 1965	July 22, 1965	July 23, 1965	January 1, 1976	February 9, 1990
26	William B. Bryant	D.D.C.	July 12, 1965	August 11, 1965	August 11, 1965	January 31, 1982	November 13, 2005
27	William Robert Collinson	E.D. Mo. W.D. Mo.	July 14, 1965	August 11, 1965	August 11, 1965	August 19, 1980	June 1, 1995
28	Luther Boyd Eubanks	W.D. Okla.	July 19, 1965	August 11, 1965	August 11, 1965	June 30, 1986	August 31, 1987
29	Oliver Gasch	D.D.C.	July 12, 1965	August 11, 1965	August 11, 1965	November 30, 1981	July 8, 1999
30	Elmo Bolton Hunter	W.D. Mo.	July 14, 1965	August 11, 1965	August 11, 1965	December 31, 1980	December 27, 2003
31	Robert Earl Maxwell	N.D. W. Va.	July 19, 1965	August 11, 1965	August 11, 1965	July 19, 1995	November 20, 2010
32	Oren Harris	E.D. Ark. W.D. Ark.	July 26, 1965	August 11, 1965	August 12, 1965	February 3, 1976	February 5, 1997
33	William O. Mehrtens	S.D. Fla.	August 20, 1965	August 31, 1965	September 1, 1965	September 15, 1975	July 16, 1980
34	Sidney Oslin Smith Jr.	N.D. Ga.	August 24, 1965	September 10, 1965	September 10, 1965	June 1, 1974	–
35	Dan Monroe Russell Jr.	S.D. Miss.	September 24, 1965	October 1, 1965	October 2, 1965	October 25, 1983	April 16, 2011
36	Marvin E. Frankel	S.D.N.Y.	September 2, 1965	October 21, 1965	October 21, 1965	September 30, 1978	–
37	John W. Reynolds Jr.	E.D. Wis.	October 13, 1965	October 21, 1965	October 21, 1965	August 31, 1986	January 7, 2002
38	William Joseph Lynch	N.D. Ill.	January 19, 1966	March 4, 1966	March 7, 1966	August 9, 1976	–
39	William Kernahan Thomas	N.D. Ohio	October 18, 1965	March 4, 1966	March 7, 1966	February 15, 1981	March 20, 2001
40	Frederick Jacob Reagan Heebe	E.D. La.	February 16, 1966	March 25, 1966	March 26, 1966	August 26, 1992	August 10, 2014
41	Russell Evans Smith	D. Mont.	February 16, 1966	March 25, 1966	March 26, 1966	May 12, 1979	March 29, 1990
42	William Nelson Goodwin	E.D. Wash. W.D. Wash.	March 21, 1966	April 21, 1966	April 21, 1966	December 31, 1975	–
43	Miles Lord	D. Minn.	February 10, 1966	April 28, 1966	April 28, 1966	July 1, 1985	September 8, 1985
44	W. Arthur Garrity Jr.	D. Mass.	May 23, 1966	June 24, 1966	June 24, 1966	December 1, 1985	September 16, 1999
45	A. Andrew Hauk	S.D. Cal. / C.D. Cal.	June 13, 1966	June 29, 1966	June 29, 1966	September 29, 1982	November 9, 2004
46	Walter R. Mansfield	S.D.N.Y.	June 13, 1966	June 29, 1966	June 29, 1966	June 8, 1971	Elevated
47	Raymond James Pettine	D.R.I.	June 13, 1966	June 29, 1966	June 29, 1966	July 6, 1982	November 17, 2003
48	Thomas Virgil Pittman	M.D. Ala. S.D. Ala.	June 13, 1966	June 29, 1966	June 29, 1966	June 2, 1970; July 15, 1981	– January 6, 2012
49	William Percival Gray	S.D. Cal. / C.D. Cal.	June 13, 1966	June 29, 1966	July 2, 1966	March 26, 1982	February 10, 1992
50	C. Clyde Atkins	S.D. Fla.	June 28, 1966	July 22, 1966	July 22, 1966	December 31, 1982	March 11, 1999
51	Joseph Peter Kinneary	S.D. Ohio	June 28, 1966	July 22, 1966	July 22, 1966	December 31, 1986	February 14, 2003
52	Jack Roberts	W.D. Tex.	June 28, 1966	July 22, 1966	July 22, 1966	May 1, 1980	February 27, 1988
53	John Virgil Singleton Jr.	S.D. Tex.	June 28, 1966	July 22, 1966	July 22, 1966	April 1, 1988	June 1, 1992
54	William McLaughlin Taylor Jr.	N.D. Tex.	June 28, 1966	July 22, 1966	July 22, 1966	February 7, 1979	June 17, 1985
55	Woodrow Bradley Seals	S.D. Tex.	June 28, 1966	July 22, 1966	July 23, 1966	December 25, 1982	October 27, 1990
56	Ernest Allen Guinn	W.D. Tex.	June 28, 1966	July 22, 1966	July 27, 1966	June 9, 1974	–
57	Ted Cabot	S.D. Fla.	July 11, 1966	August 10, 1966	August 11, 1966	December 4, 1971	–
58	John P. Fullam	E.D. Pa.	August 24, 1965	August 10, 1966	August 11, 1966	April 1, 1990	March 8, 2018
59	Bernard J. Leddy	D. Vt.	August 16, 1966	August 25, 1966	August 25, 1966	January 9, 1972	–
60	Constance Baker Motley	S.D.N.Y.	January 26, 1966	August 30, 1966	August 30, 1966	September 30, 1986	September 28, 2005
61	Alexander J. Napoli	N.D. Ill.	August 17, 1966	September 20, 1966	September 21, 1966	July 12, 1972	–
62	Henry Seiler Wise	E.D. Ill. / C.D. Ill.	August 17, 1966	September 20, 1966	September 21, 1966	March 31, 1978	March 16, 1982
63	Alexander Harvey II	D. Md.	September 9, 1966	September 22, 1966	September 22, 1966	March 8, 1991	December 4, 2017
64	Frank Albert Kaufman	D. Md.	September 9, 1966	September 22, 1966	September 22, 1966	June 16, 1986	July 31, 1997
65	Edward James Boyle Sr.	E.D. La.	August 16, 1966	October 20, 1966	November 3, 1966	December 1, 1981	July 24, 2002
66	Fred James Cassibry	E.D. La.	October 11, 1966	October 20, 1966	November 3, 1966	March 15, 1984	April 3, 1987
67	William Perry Copple	D. Ariz.	September 30, 1966	October 20, 1966	November 3, 1966	November 30, 1983	September 14, 2000
68	Warren J. Ferguson	C.D. Cal.	September 26, 1966	October 20, 1966	November 3, 1966	December 20, 1979	Elevated
69	Timothy Sylvester Hogan	S.D. Ohio	September 30, 1966	October 20, 1966	November 3, 1966	September 24, 1979	January 30, 1989
70	Robert Malcolm McRae Jr.	W.D. Tenn.	September 22, 1966	October 20, 1966	November 3, 1966	December 31, 1986	June 25, 2004
71	Lansing Leroy Mitchell	E.D. La.	October 6, 1966	October 20, 1966	November 3, 1966	November 3, 1981	April 24, 2001
72	James Ellsworth Noland	S.D. Ind.	October 6, 1966	October 20, 1966	November 3, 1966	December 31, 1986	August 12, 1992
73	Robert Francis Peckham	N.D. Cal.	September 9, 1966	October 20, 1966	November 3, 1966	November 11, 1988	February 16, 1993
74	David Stewart Porter	S.D. Ohio	September 30, 1966	October 20, 1966	November 3, 1966	September 23, 1979	January 5, 1989
75	Manuel Real	C.D. Cal.	September 26, 1966	October 20, 1966	November 3, 1966	November 4, 2018	June 26, 2019
76	Aubrey Eugene Robinson Jr.	D.D.C.	October 6, 1966	October 20, 1966	November 3, 1966	March 1, 1992	February 27, 2000
77	Alvin Benjamin Rubin	E.D. La.	August 16, 1966	October 20, 1966	November 3, 1966	October 8, 1977	Elevated
78	Donald S. Russell	D.S.C.	October 11, 1966	October 20, 1966	November 3, 1966	May 1, 1971	Elevated
79	Charles R. Scott	M.D. Fla.	October 11, 1966	October 20, 1966	November 3, 1966	November 12, 1976	May 12, 1983
80	John Lewis Smith Jr.	D.D.C.	October 6, 1966	October 20, 1966	November 3, 1966	January 31, 1983	September 4, 1992
81	James von der Heydt	D. Alaska	September 9, 1966	October 20, 1966	November 3, 1966	July 15, 1984	December 1, 2013
82	James August Comiskey	E.D. La.	January 16, 1967	March 2, 1967	March 4, 1967	June 15, 1975	–
83	Myron L. Gordon	E.D. Wis.	January 16, 1967	March 2, 1967	March 4, 1967	February 12, 1983	November 3, 2009
84	Frank Gordon Theis	D. Kan.	January 16, 1967	March 2, 1967	March 4, 1967	July 31, 1981	January 17, 1998
85	Joseph Cornelius Waddy	D.D.C.	January 16, 1967	March 2, 1967	March 4, 1967	August 1, 1978	–
86	Robert C. Belloni	D. Ore.	February 21, 1967	April 4, 1967	April 4, 1967	April 4, 1984	November 3, 1999
87	Frank Jerome Murray	D. Mass.	February 21, 1967	April 5, 1967	April 5, 1967	July 15, 1977	February 12, 1995
88	Jack B. Weinstein	E.D.N.Y.	October 17, 1966 (Note: Renominated on January 16, 1967.)	April 14, 1967	April 15, 1967	March 1, 1993	June 15, 2021
89	Hiram Rafael Cancio	D.P.R.	January 16, 1967	June 12, 1967	June 12, 1967	January 31, 1974	–
90	Joe Oscar Eaton	S.D. Fla.	May 24, 1967	June 12, 1967	June 12, 1967	April 2, 1985	September 28, 2008
91	Newell Edenfield	N.D. Ga.	May 24, 1967	June 12, 1967	June 12, 1967	September 1, 1981	December 26, 1981
92	Ben Krentzman	M.D. Fla.	May 24, 1967	June 12, 1967	June 12, 1967	November 15, 1982	March 29, 1998
93	Robert Dale Morgan	S.D. Ill. / C.D. Ill.	May 24, 1967	June 12, 1967	June 12, 1967	May 28, 1982	May 29, 2002
94	Milton Pollack	S.D.N.Y.	May 24, 1967	June 12, 1967	June 12, 1967	September 29, 1983	August 13, 2004
95	Paul X. Williams	W.D. Ark.	May 24, 1967	June 12, 1967	June 12, 1967	October 31, 1981	January 24, 1994
96	Charles R. Weiner	E.D. Pa.	May 24, 1967	June 12, 1967	June 14, 1967	December 31, 1988	November 9, 2005
97	Thomas Ambrose Masterson	E.D. Pa.	January 16, 1967	June 12, 1967	June 15, 1967	November 16, 1973	–
98	Emanuel Mac Troutman	E.D. Pa.	May 24, 1967	June 12, 1967	June 16, 1967	September 1, 1982	October 8, 2004
99	Woodrow W. Jones	W.D.N.C.	June 27, 1967	June 28, 1967	June 28, 1967	February 1, 1985	November 25, 2002
100	Philip Neville	D. Minn.	May 24, 1967	July 31, 1967	July 31, 1967	February 13, 1974	–
101	Thomas Demetrios Lambros	N.D. Ohio	June 5, 1967	August 18, 1967	August 18, 1967	February 10, 1995	–
102	Richard Boykin Kellam	E.D. Va.	July 17, 1967	August 18, 1967	August 25, 1967	May 30, 1981	June 8, 1996
103	John Ashton MacKenzie	E.D. Va.	July 17, 1967	August 18, 1967	August 25, 1967	November 30, 1985	January 30, 1998
104	Robert R. Merhige Jr.	E.D. Va.	July 17, 1967	August 18, 1967	August 25, 1967	November 30, 1986	June 8, 1998
105	Juan B. Fernandez-Badillo	D.P.R.	September 18, 1967	October 12, 1967	October 12, 1967	June 30, 1972	October 16, 1989
106	Damon Keith	E.D. Mich.	September 25, 1967	October 12, 1967	October 12, 1967	November 22, 1977	Elevated
107	Lawrence Aloysius Whipple	D.N.J.	August 25, 1967	October 12, 1967	October 12, 1967	September 1, 1978	June 8, 1983
108	Winston Arnow	N.D. Fla.	November 29, 1967	December 7, 1967	December 7, 1967	March 14, 1981	November 28, 1994
109	Harry Pregerson	C.D. Cal.	November 29, 1967	December 7, 1967	December 7, 1967	November 6, 1979	Elevated
110	Gerhard Gesell	D.D.C.	November 29, 1967	December 7, 1967	December 12, 1967	January 22, 1993	February 19, 1993
111	John Thomas Curtin	W.D.N.Y.	November 28, 1967	December 14, 1967	December 14, 1967	July 1, 1989	April 14, 2017
112	Edward Joseph Schwartz	S.D. Cal.	January 29, 1968	March 28, 1968	March 28, 1968	March 26, 1982	March 22, 2000
113	William Colbert Keady	N.D. Miss.	March 26, 1968	April 3, 1968	April 4, 1968	April 26, 1983	June 16, 1989
114	June Lazenby Green	D.D.C.	April 11, 1968	June 6, 1968	June 7, 1968	January 15, 1984	February 2, 2001
115	William Wayne Justice	E.D. Tex.	April 25, 1968	June 6, 1968	June 7, 1968	June 30, 1998	October 13, 2009
116	James Bryan McMillan	W.D.N.C.	April 25, 1968	June 6, 1968	June 7, 1968	September 1, 1989	March 4, 1995
117	Walter Nixon	S.D. Miss.	May 29, 1968	June 6, 1968	June 7, 1968	November 3, 1989	–
118	John H. Pratt	D.D.C.	April 11, 1968	June 6, 1968	June 7, 1968	December 1, 1989	August 11, 1995
119	Halbert Owen Woodward	N.D. Tex.	April 25, 1968	June 6, 1968	June 7, 1968	December 30, 1986	October 2, 2000
120	Morris E. Lasker	S.D.N.Y.	November 28, 1967	June 24, 1968	June 24, 1968	October 3, 1983	December 25, 2009
121	Orrin Grimmell Judd	E.D.N.Y.	April 25, 1968	June 24, 1968	July 17, 1968	July 7, 1976	–
122	Anthony J. Travia	E.D.N.Y.	April 25, 1968	June 24, 1968	July 17, 1968	November 30, 1974	–
123	Hugh H. Bownes	D.N.H.	July 17, 1968	July 25, 1968	July 25, 1968	October 31, 1977	Elevated
124	Alexander Atkinson Lawrence Jr.	S.D. Ga.	July 17, 1968	July 25, 1968	July 25, 1968	August 2, 1978	August 20, 1979
125	Orma Rinehart Smith	N.D. Miss.	July 17, 1968	July 25, 1968	July 25, 1968	August 16, 1978	July 5, 1982
126	James Levin Latchum	D. Del.	July 17, 1968	August 2, 1968	August 3, 1968	December 23, 1983	January 31, 2004
127	Lawrence Gubow	E.D. Mich.	August 2, 1968	September 13, 1968	September 14, 1968	March 26, 1978	–
128	Albert John Henderson	N.D. Ga.	September 25, 1968	October 10, 1968	October 11, 1968	July 26, 1979	Elevated

== Specialty courts (Article III) ==
=== United States Court of Customs and Patent Appeals ===
#	Judge	Nomination date	Confirmation date	Began active service	Ended active service	Ended senior status
1	Phillip Baldwin	May 29, 1968	July 25, 1968	July 25, 1968	November 24, 1986	April 8, 1991

=== United States Court of Claims ===
#	Judge	Nomination date	Confirmation date	Began active service	Ended active service	Ended senior status
1	Arnold Wilson Cowen	June 16, 1964	July 2, 1964	July 8, 1964	March 1, 1977	October 28, 2007
2	Linton McGee Collins	September 8, 1964	September 17, 1964	September 18, 1964	April 12, 1972	–
3	Byron George Skelton	August 17, 1966	October 20, 1966	November 3, 1966	May 1, 1977	February 6, 2004
4	Philip Nichols Jr.	October 6, 1966	October 21, 1966	November 3, 1966	October 1, 1983	January 26, 1990

=== United States Customs Court ===
#	Judge	Nomination date	Confirmation date	Began active service	Ended active service	Ended senior status
1	Philip Nichols Jr.	June 16, 1964	September 15, 1964	September 15, 1964	November 30, 1966	Elevated
2	Frederick Landis Jr.	October 6, 1965	October 15, 1965	October 16, 1965	December 31, 1983	March 1, 1990
3	James Lopez Watson	October 6, 1965	March 4, 1966	March 7, 1966	February 28, 1991	September 1, 2001
4	Lindley Beckworth	January 16, 1967	March 2, 1967	March 4, 1967	August 31, 1968	–
5	Herbert N. Maletz	November 6, 1967	November 16, 1967	November 16, 1967	December 31, 1982	January 6, 2002
6	Bernard Newman	May 29, 1968	June 24, 1968	June 24, 1968	December 31, 1983	February 22, 1999
7	Samuel Murray Rosenstein	July 17, 1968	July 25, 1968	July 25, 1968	December 31, 1970	November 1, 1980
8	Edward D. Re	September 12, 1968	October 2, 1968	October 4, 1968	April 30, 1991	–
