= Ann Hannaford Lamar =

American judge (born 1952)

Ann Hannaford Lamar (born 1952) is a retired American attorney and judge from the state of Mississippi. She served as an associate justice of the Supreme Court of Mississippi. She was the third woman to serve on the Mississippi Supreme Court.

== Early life and education ==
Born Ann Hannaford, she is the daughter of former Chancery Judge Leon Hannaford of Senatobia, Mississippi. She attended Northwest Mississippi Junior College from1970 to 1971. In 1974 she earned a Bachelor of Science degree in education from Delta State University. She earned a law degree from the University of Mississippi School of Law in 1982.

== Career ==
Lamar worked as an administrative assistant in the Governor's Office of Education and Training from 1974 to 1977 while her husband, John T. Lamar Jr., earned a law degree from the Mississippi College School of Law. They returned to Senatobia, where she worked as a court reporter in chancery court for two years.

She practiced law with her husband in Senatobia from May 1982 to August 1987 and from February 1993 through December 1995. Their practice involved litigation in civil, criminal, and domestic relations cases. Their firm represented several governmental entities, including the Tate County Board of Supervisors.

Lamar served for a year and 10 months as district attorney in the 17th District. She was an assistant district attorney from August 1987 to January 1993 and from January 1996 to December 1999. Lamar served five and a half years as a circuit judge from the 17th Circuit Court, which is made up of DeSoto, Panola, Tallahatchie, Tate and Yalobusha counties. She was appointed to the Circuit Court vacancy created when former Circuit Judge George C. Carlson, Jr. was appointed to the Supreme Court on November 1, 2001.

Lamar was appointed to the Mississippi Supreme Court on May 21, 2007. Gov. Haley Barbour appointed Lamar to the vacancy created by the retirement of Presiding Justice Kay B. Cobb. From January to May 2007, she presided over the 17th Circuit Drug Court, supervising program participants in four of the five counties in the district. In April 2007, she concluded her year as chair of the Conference of Circuit Judges. She previously served for a year as vice-chair of the conference. In 2008 she was elected to a full term on the Court. She retired on December 31, 2016.

In 2006, Lamar served as president of the William C. Keady American Inns of Court and as a member of the Mississippi Judicial College Board of Governors. She is a former member of the Board of Directors of the Mississippi Prosecutor's Association.

== Personal life ==
She and her husband are the parents of two adult children, John T. Lamar III (Trey), and Vance Lamar. She is a member of First Baptist Church in Senatobia, where she also teaches Sunday School.
