= Michael P. Mills =

American judge (born 1956)

Senior Judge of the United States District Court for the Northern District of Mississippi
- Incumbent
- Assumed office November 1, 2021

Chief Judge of the United States District Court for the Northern District of Mississippi
- In office 2007–2014
- Preceded by: Glen H. Davidson
- Succeeded by: Sharion Aycock

Judge of the United States District Court for the Northern District of Mississippi
- In office October 16, 2001 – November 1, 2021
- Appointed by: George W. Bush
- Preceded by: Neal Brooks Biggers Jr.
- Succeeded by: James D. Maxwell II

Associate Justice of the Mississippi Supreme Court
- In office 1995–2001
- Preceded by: Armis E. Hawkins
- Succeeded by: George C. Carlson Jr.

Member of the Mississippi House of Representatives
- In office 1984–1995

Personal details
- Born: Michael Paul Mills; August 25, 1956 (age 69) Charleston, South Carolina, U.S.
- Spouse: Mona Mills
- Education: Itawamba Community College (AA); University of Mississippi (BA, JD); University of Virginia (LLM)

Michael Paul Mills (born August 25, 1956) is an American lawyer and jurist serving as a senior United States district judge of the United States District Court for the Northern District of Mississippi.

== Early life and education ==
Mills was born on August 25, 1956, in Charleston, South Carolina. He received an Associate of Arts from Itawamba Community College in 1976, a Bachelor of Arts from the University of Mississippi in 1978, a Juris Doctor from the University of Mississippi School of Law in 1980, and a Master of Laws from the University of Virginia School of Law in 2001.

== Career ==
From 1980 to 1995 he engaged in the private practice of law in Mississippi. He was a member of the Mississippi House of Representatives from 1984 to 1995, and served as a justice of the Mississippi Supreme Court from 1995 to 2001.

In addition to his work as a lawyer and judge, Mills published a collection of short stories titled Twice Told Tombigbee Tales.

=== Federal judicial service ===
On September 4, 2001, Mills was nominated by President George W. Bush to a seat on the United States District Court for the Northern District of Mississippi vacated by Judge Neal Brooks Biggers Jr. Mills was confirmed by the United States Senate in a 98–0 vote on October 11, 2001, and received his commission on October 16, 2001. He became chief judge in 2007, and served in that capacity until 2014, when he was succeeded by Sharion Aycock.

Mills suffered a heart attack in January 2018, but recovered and was able to continue serving. He assumed senior status on November 1, 2021.

Legal offices
Preceded by Armis E. Hawkins	Justice of the Supreme Court of Mississippi; 1995–2001	Succeeded by George C. Carlson Jr.
Preceded by Neal Brooks Biggers Jr.	Judge of the United States District Court for the Northern District of Mississippi; 2001–2021	Succeeded by James D. Maxwell II
Preceded by Glen H. Davidson	Chief Judge of the United States District Court for the Northern District of Mississippi; 2007–2014	Succeeded by Sharion Aycock
