= Courts of Mississippi =

Courts of Mississippi include:

State courts of Mississippi

- Supreme Court of Mississippi
  - Mississippi Court of Appeals
    - Mississippi Chancery Courts
    - Mississippi Circuit Courts (23 circuits)
      - Mississippi County Courts
        - Mississippi Justice Courts
        - Mississippi Municipal Courts
        - Mississippi Drug Courts
        - Mississippi Youth Courts

Federal courts located in Mississippi

- United States District Court for the Northern District of Mississippi
- United States District Court for the Southern District of Mississippi

Former federal courts of Mississippi

- United States District Court for the District of Mississippi (extinct, subdivided on June 18, 1838)
