= Mississippi Circuit Courts =

Part of the Courts of Mississippi

Mississippi Circuit Courts are courts of law. They are the state's general‑jurisdiction trial courts for felony criminal cases, major civil actions over a certain amount, and appeals from lower courts. There are 23 districts with a total of 57 judges. The judges of Mississippi's Circuit Courts are styled "Judge".

== Elections ==
Judges in Mississippi Circuit Courts are elected every four years in a nonpartisan election. Circuit Court judges are required to have five years of experience as a practicing attorney, to be at least 26 years old, to have lived in Mississippi for at least five years, and to live within the court's district.

== Districts ==
Mississippi Circuit Courts are divided into the following 23 districts.

District	Number of Judges	Counties covered
1st	4	Alcorn, Itawamba, Lee, Monroe, Pontotoc, Prentiss, Tishomingo
2nd	4	Hancock, Harrison, Stone
3rd	3	Benton, Calhoun, Chickasaw, Lafayette, Marshall, Tippah, Union
4th	4	Leflore, Sunflower, Washington
5th	2	Attala, Carroll, Choctaw, Grenada, Montgomery, Webster, Winston
6th	2	Adams, Amite, Franklin, Wilkinson
7th	4	Hinds
8th	2	Leake, Neshoba, Newton, Scott
9th	2	Issaquena, Sharkey, Warren
10th	2	Clarke, Kemper, Lauderdale, Wayne
11th	3	Bolivar, Coahoma, Quitman, Tunica
12th	2	Forrest, Perry
13th	2	Covington, Jasper, Simpson, Smith
14th	2	Lincoln, Pike, Walthall
15th	3	Jefferson Davis, Lamar, Lawrence, Marion, Pearl River
16th	3	Clay, Lowndes, Noxubee, Oktibbeha
17th	2	Panola, Tallahatchie, Tate, Yalobusha
18th		Jones
19th	3	George, Greene, Jackson
20th	3	Madison, Rankin
21st		Desoto
22nd		Holmes, Humphreys, Yazoo
23rd	2	Claiborne, Copiah, Jefferson

== See also ==
- Courts of Mississippi
