= Charles Clark (judge) =

American judge (1925–2011)

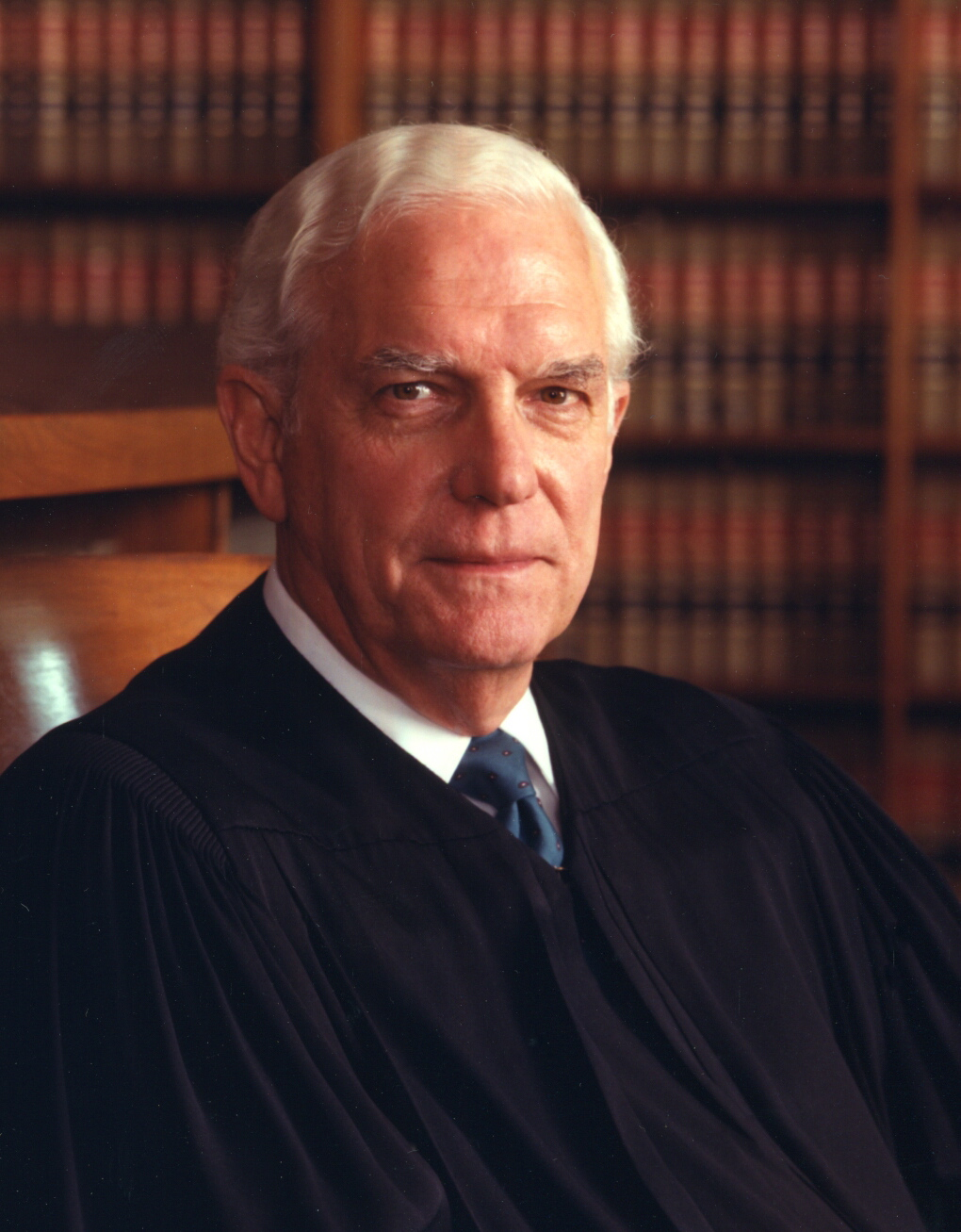

Chief Judge of the United States Court of Appeals for the Fifth Circuit
- In office October 1, 1981 – January 15, 1992
- Preceded by: John Cooper Godbold
- Succeeded by: Henry Anthony Politz

Judge of the United States Court of Appeals for the Fifth Circuit
- In office October 17, 1969 – January 15, 1992
- Appointed by: Richard Nixon
- Preceded by: Claude Feemster Clayton
- Succeeded by: James L. Dennis

Personal details
- Born: September 12, 1925 Memphis, Tennessee, U.S.
- Died: March 6, 2011 (aged 85) Madison, Mississippi, U.S.
- Party: Democratic
- Education: University of Mississippi (LLB)

Charles Clark (September 12, 1925 – March 6, 2011) was a United States circuit judge of the United States Court of Appeals for the Fifth Circuit. He is, as of 2019, the highest ranking judicial official from Mississippi since Lucius Quintus Cincinnatus Lamar II served on the United States Supreme Court in 1893.

== Early life and career ==
Clark was born in Memphis, Tennessee to Charles and Anita Clark and was the great-grandson of Mississippi Governor Charles Clark (1863–1865). After being graduated from Cleveland High School (Cleveland, Mississippi), he entered the United States Naval Reserve as an ensign in 1943 and left the Reserve after the end of World War II three years later. He attended law school at the University of Mississippi, where he was a member of Delta Psi fraternity and met his future wife, Emily. He began the practice of law in 1946 in Jackson, Mississippi and continued in private practice for five years, earning a Bachelor of Laws from the University of Mississippi School of Law in 1948, then rejoined the Naval Reserve as a lieutenant as the Korean War heated up in 1951. He left the Naval Reserve the following year, and resumed his law practice in 1953.

In 1962, Clark represented the University of Mississippi's Board of Trustees when James Meredith sued for being rejected based on race. Clark argued that the University had no policy on race and Meredith's rejection was based on a lack of qualifications. The case was settled on appeal by the U.S. Supreme Court, which ruled in Meredith’s favor in September 1962, resulting in the Ole Miss riot of 1962.

== Federal judicial service ==
On October 7, 1969, President Richard Nixon nominated Clark to a seat on the United States Court of Appeals for the Fifth Circuit vacated by Judge Claude Feemster Clayton. He was confirmed by the United States Senate only eight days later on October 15, 1969 and received his commission two days later. In 1973 and again in 1976, he was recommended to fill vacancies on the United States Supreme Court and each time, he received the American Bar Association's highest qualification. Clark was Chief Judge of the Fifth Circuit from 1981 until his retirement from the court on January 15, 1992. He resided in Jackson, Mississippi with his wife Emily until his death on March 6, 2011. In addition to producing more than 2200 opinions, and presiding over the Fifth Circuit for more than ten years, Judge Clark was appointed by Chief Justice Warren Burger and again by Chief Justice William Rehnquist to the Judicial Conference of the United States, the principal policymaking body for the federal courts. During his eleven years there, he served as chairman of the Budget Committee and then chairman of the Executive Committee.

== Honors ==
Clark was awarded an honorary Doctorate of Laws from Mississippi College and was inducted into the Hall of Fame at the Law School of Ole Miss in the spring of 2009.

== Notable clerks ==
- Leslie H. Southwick, 1976–1977
- Rodney A. Smolla, 1978–1979
- Rives Kistler, 1981–1982
- Michael B. Thornton, 1983–1984
- Charles R. Eskridge III, 1990–1991

Legal offices
| Preceded by Claude Feemster Clayton | Judge of the United States Court of Appeals for the Fifth Circuit; 1969–1992 | Succeeded by James L. Dennis |
| Preceded by John Cooper Godbold | Chief Judge of the United States Court of Appeals for the Fifth Circuit; 1981–1992 | Succeeded by Henry Anthony Politz |
