= United States District Court for the Northern District of Mississippi =

United States federal district court in Mississippi

Coordinates: 34.367536°N 89.520681°W

- (N.D. Miss.)
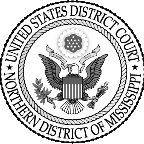
- Location: Oxford More locations: Aberdeen; Greenville
- Appeals to: Fifth Circuit
- Established: June 18, 1838
- Judges: 3
- Chief Judge: Debra M. Brown

Officers of the court
- U.S. Attorney: Scott F. Leary
- U.S. Marshal: Daniel McKittrick
- www.msnd.uscourts.gov

The United States District Court for the Northern District of Mississippi (in case citations, N.D. Miss.) is a federal court in the Fifth Circuit with facilities in Aberdeen, Greenville, and Oxford.

Appeals from cases brought in the Northern District of Mississippi are taken to the United States Court of Appeals for the Fifth Circuit (except for patent claims and claims against the U.S. government under the Tucker Act, which are appealed to the Federal Circuit).

The United States attorney for the Northern District of Mississippi represents the United States in civil and criminal litigation in the court. As of December 18, 2025, the United States attorney is Scott F. Leary.

== Jurisdiction ==
The northern district comprises three divisions.

1. The Aberdeen Division comprises the counties of Alcorn, Chickasaw, Choctaw, Clay, Itawamba, Lee, Lowndes, Monroe, Oktibbeha, Prentiss, Tishomingo, Webster, and Winston.
  The court for the Aberdeen Division is held at Aberdeen, Ackerman, and Corinth.
2. The Oxford Division comprises the counties of Benton, Calhoun, DeSoto, Lafayette, Marshall, Panola, Pontotoc, Quitman, Tallahatchie, Tate, Tippah, Tunica, Union, and Yalobusha.
  The court for the Oxford Division is held at Oxford, Pittsboro, and Pontotoc.
3. The Greenville Division comprises the counties of Attala, Bolivar, Carroll, Coahoma, Grenada, Humphreys, Leflore, Montgomery, Sunflower, and Washington.
  The court for the Greenville Division is held at Clarksdale, Cleveland, and Greenville.

== Current judges ==
As of December 18, 2025:

#	Title	Judge	Duty station	Born	Term of service			Appointed by
#	Title	Judge	Duty station	Born	Active	Chief	Senior	Appointed by
16	Chief Judge	Debra M. Brown	Greenville	1963	2013–present	2021–present	—	Obama
17	District Judge	Robert P. Chamberlin	Aberdeen	1965	2025–present	—	—	Trump
18	District Judge	James D. Maxwell II	Oxford	1975	2025–present	—	—	Trump
12	Senior Judge	Glen H. Davidson	Aberdeen	1941	1985–2007	2000–2007	2007–present	Reagan
14	Senior Judge	Michael P. Mills	Oxford	1956	2001–2021	2007–2014	2021–present	G.W. Bush
15	Senior Judge	Sharion Aycock	Aberdeen	1955	2007–2025	2014–2021	2025–present	G.W. Bush

== Former judges ==
#	Judge	Born–died	Active service	Chief Judge	Senior status	Appointed by	Reason for termination
1	George Adams	1784–1844	1838 (Note: Reassigned from the District of Mississippi. Jointly appointed to the Northern and Southern Districts of Mississippi.)	—	—	Jackson/Operation of law	resignation
2	Samuel J. Gholson	1808–1883	1839–1861 (Note: Jointly appointed to the Northern and Southern Districts of Mississippi.)	—	—	Van Buren	resignation
3	Robert Andrews Hill	1811–1900	1866–1891	—	—	A. Johnson	retirement
4	Henry Clay Niles	1850–1918	1891–1918 (Note: Recess appointment; formally nominated on December 10, 1891, confirmed by the United States Senate on January 11, 1892, and received commission the same day. Jointly appointed to the Northern and Southern Districts of Mississippi.)	—	—	B. Harrison	death
5	Edwin R. Holmes	1878–1961	1918–1929	—	—	Wilson	reassignment
6	Elijah Allen Cox	1887–1974	1929–1957	—	1957–1974	Coolidge	death
7	Claude Feemster Clayton	1909–1969	1958–1967	1966–1967	—	Eisenhower	elevation
8	William Colbert Keady	1913–1989	1968–1983	1968–1982	1983–1989	L. Johnson	death
9	Orma Rinehart Smith	1904–1982	1968–1978	—	1978–1982	L. Johnson	death
10	Lyonel Thomas Senter Jr.	1933–2011	1979–1998	1982–1998	1998–2011	Carter	death
11	Neal Brooks Biggers Jr.	1935–2023	1984–2000	1998–2000	2000–2023	Reagan	death
13	W. Allen Pepper Jr.	1941–2012	1999–2012	—	—	Clinton	death

== Chief judges ==
Chief judges have administrative responsibilities with respect to their district court. Unlike the Supreme Court, where one justice is specifically nominated to be chief, the office of chief judge rotates among the district court judges. To be chief, a judge must have been in active service on the court for at least one year, be under the age of 65, and have not previously served as chief judge.

A vacancy is filled by the judge highest in seniority among the group of qualified judges. The chief judge serves for a term of seven years, or until age 70, whichever occurs first. The age restrictions are waived if no members of the court would otherwise be qualified for the position.

When the office was created in 1948, the chief judge was the longest-serving judge who had not elected to retire, on what has since 1958 been known as senior status, or declined to serve as chief judge. After August 6, 1959, judges could not become or remain chief after turning 70 years old. The current rules have been in operation since October 1, 1982.

== Succession of seats ==
Seat 1
Seat reassigned from District of Mississippi on June 18, 1838 by 5 Stat. 247 (concurrent with Southern District)
Adams	1838
Gholson	1839–1861
Hill	1866–1891
Niles	1892–1918
Holmes	1918–1929
Seat reassigned solely to Southern District on March 1, 1929 by 45 Stat. 1422

Seat 2
Seat established on March 1, 1929 by 45 Stat. 1422
Cox	1929–1957
Clayton	1958–1967
Smith	1968–1978
Senter, Jr.	1979–1998
Pepper, Jr.	1999–2012
Brown	2013–present

Seat 3
Seat established on March 18, 1966 by 80 Stat. 75
Keady	1968–1983
Biggers, Jr.	1984–2000
Mills	2001–2021
Maxwell II	2025–present

Seat 4
Seat established on July 10, 1984 by 98 Stat. 333
Davidson	1985–2007
Aycock	2007–2025
Chamberlin	2025–present

== List of U.S. Attorneys ==
The U.S. Attorney is the chief law enforcement officer for the Northern District of Mississippi.

- Samuel F. Butterworth (1838–1841)
- Oscar F. Bledsoe (1841–1848)
- Andrew K. Blythe (1848–1850)
- Woodson T. Ligon (1850–1853)
- Nathaniel S. Price (1853–1854)
- John A. Orr (1854–1857)
- Flavius J. Lovejoy (1857)
- G. W. Wells (1870)
- Thomas Walton (1876–1878)
- Green C. Chandler (1878–1885)
- Charles B. Howry (1885–1889)
- Henry C. Niles (1889–1891)
- Mack A. Montgomery (1891–1893)
- Andrew F. Fox (1893–1896)
- Chapman L. Anderson (1896–1897)
- Mack A. Montgomery (1897–1905)
- William D. Frazee (1905–1912)
- Lester G. Fant (1912–1914)
- Wilson S. Hill (1914–1921)
- J. L. Roberson (1921)
- Samuel E. Oldham (1921–1925)
- John H. Cook (1925–1929)
- Lester G. Fant (1929–1937)
- George T. Mitchell (1937–1942)
- James O. Day (1942–1945)
- Chester I. Sumners (1945–1951)
- Noel H. Malone (1951–1954)
- Chester L. Sumners (1954)
- Thomas R. Ethridge (1954–1961)
- B. Euple Dozier (1961)
- Hosea M. Ray (1961–1981)
- Glen H. Davidson (1981–1985)
- Robert Q. Whitwell (1985–1991)
- Sam J. Beckett (1991–1998)
- Walter K. Locke (1998–2010)
- Peter A. O'Pry (2010–2014)
- Josiah M. Alden (2014–2021)
- J. Clay Joyner (2021–2025)
- Scott F. Leary (2025-present)

== See also ==
- Courts of Mississippi
- List of current United States district judges
- List of United States federal courthouses in Mississippi
