= University of Mississippi School of Law =

Public law school in Oxford, Mississippi, US

- Parent school: University of Mississippi
- Established: 1854
- School type: Public
- Dean: Frederick G. Slabach
- Location: Oxford, Mississippi
- Enrollment: 495
- Faculty: 34
- USNWR ranking: 120th (tie) (2024)
- Website: law.olemiss.edu

The University of Mississippi School of Law, also known as Ole Miss Law, is an ABA-accredited law school located on the campus of the University of Mississippi in Oxford, Mississippi, United States. Established in 1854, the School of Law offers the only dedicated aerospace law curriculum in the US from an ABA-accredited school. The University of Mississippi School of Law is also the only school in the US, and one of only a handful in the world, to offer a Master of Laws (LL.M.) in Air and Space Law.

== History ==
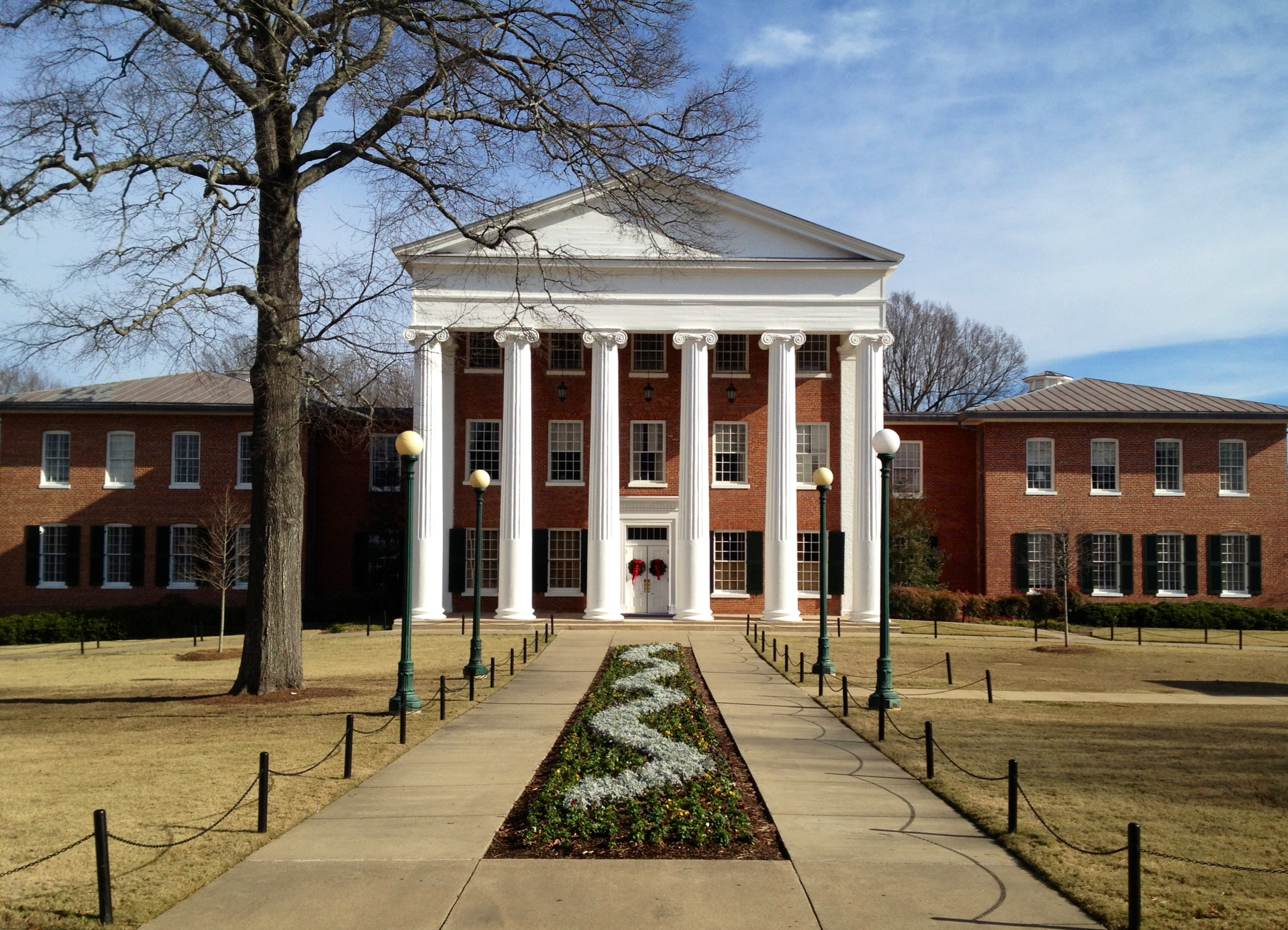
Law classes were originally held in the Lyceum.

The University of Mississippi School of Law was founded in 1854 by the state legislature after recognizing a need for formal law instruction in the state of Mississippi. The "Department of Law," as it was then referred to, consisted of seven students and one professor. The School of Law has had seven homes over the course of its history. Classes were originally held in the Lyceum, the oldest building on the University of Mississippi campus. Shortly before the Civil War, the then-Department of Law was relocated to a building close to Oxford Square. The university agreed to lease the building in order to prevent the owner from filing from bankruptcy. This agreement lasted until the start of the Civil War in 1861 when most of the law school's students volunteered to serve in the Confederate military. When the school reopened in 1866, it was again relocated to a building that occupied the current site of Peabody Hall. The law school closed a second time in 1876, as there were no law students during the latter years of Reconstruction. In 1911, classes were moved to Ventress Hall, which was then known as Lamar Hall, named after famed Mississippian and former professor of law L.Q.C. Lamar. The "Department of Law" officially became the "School of Law" in 1921. Ten years later, the law school moved to the building now known as Farley Hall. It remained here until 1978 when it was moved to Lamar Law Center. In January 2011, the School of Law moved a sixth time to the newly constructed Robert C. Khayat Law Center.

The School of Law has a faculty of 34 full-time and adjunct professors with expertise in various areas of practice. The student-faculty ratio is 18.2:1. The School of Law moved into a newly constructed building (the Robert C. Khayat Law Center) in January 2011.

== Programs ==
The law school is home to five auxiliary law programs: Center for Air and Space Law, the National Center for Justice and the Rule of Law, the Mississippi Innocence Project, the Mississippi Law Research Institute, and the Mississippi Judicial College. The law school also offers a number of clinical programs, including clinics in Child Advocacy, Criminal Appeals, Elder Law, Housing, Mediation Practicum, Legislation & Policy, Tax Practicum, Street Law, and Transactional Law. The MacArthur Justice Clinic, a branch of the program at Northwestern University School of Law, opened in the fall of 2014.

== Employment ==
According to Ole Miss' official 2016 ABA-required disclosures, 60.3% of the Class of 2016 obtained full-time, long-term, JD-required employment nine months after graduation. Ole Miss' Law School Transparency under-employment score is 18.9%, indicating the percentage of the Class of 2013 unemployed, pursuing an additional degree, or working in a non-professional, short-term, or part-time job nine months after graduation.

== Ranking ==
In 2025, U.S. News & World Report ranked Ole Miss Law as tied for number 121 in the country.

== Publications ==
- Mississippi Sports Law Review
- Journal of Space Law
- Mississippi Law Journal
- University of Mississippi Business Law Forum

== Notable alumni ==
- Felicia C. Adams (1984), United States Attorney for the United States District Court for the Northern District of Mississippi from 2011 to 2017
- Trent Kelly (JD 1994), U.S. Representative for Mississippi
- Jim Hood (JD 1988), Former Attorney General of Mississippi, Democratic Candidate for Mississippi Governor in 2019
- Robert C. Khayat (Class of 1966), Former University of Mississippi Chancellor, Author, Collegiate and Professional Football Player
- John Grisham (JD 1981), Author
- Charles Hillman Brough (Class of 1902), Governor of Arkansas
- Marvin Childers (Class of c. 1986), Arkansas state Representative
- Thad Cochran (JD 1965), U.S. Senator for Mississippi
- Roger Wicker (JD 1975), U.S. Senator for Mississippi
- Trent Lott (JD 1967), Former U.S. Senator for Mississippi
- James O. Eastland (JD 1925), Former U.S. Senator for Mississippi
- Gregg Harper (JD 1981), U.S. Representative for Mississippi
- Kenny Hulshof (JD 1983), Former U.S. Representative for Missouri
- Ed Bryant (JD 1972), Former U.S. Representative for Tennessee and United States Federal Judge
- Haley Barbour (JD 1973), Former Governor of Mississippi
- Ronnie Musgrove (JD 1981), Former Governor of Mississippi
- William A. Allain (LLB 1950), Former Governor of Mississippi
- William Winter (LLB 1949), Former Governor of Mississippi
- Cliff Finch (LLB 1958), Former Governor of Mississippi
- William Waller (LLB 1950), Former Governor of Mississippi
- Paul B. Johnson Jr. (LLB 1940), Former Governor of Mississippi
- Evelyn Gandy (LLB 1943), Former Lieutenant Governor of Mississippi
- Tim Ford (JD 1977), Former Mississippi Speaker of the House
- Michael P. Mills (JD 1980), United States Federal Judge
- Keith Starrett (JD 1974), United States Federal Judge
- E. Grady Jolly (LL.B 1962), Federal Judge, United States Court of Appeals for the Fifth Circuit
- Rhesa Barksdale (JD 1972), Federal Judge, United States Court of Appeals for the Fifth Circuit
- Charles Clark (LL.B 1948), Former Chief Judge, United States Court of Appeals for the Fifth Circuit
- William L. Waller Jr. (JD 1977), Chief Justice of the Mississippi Supreme Court
- George C. Carlson Jr. (JD 1972), Presiding Justice of the Mississippi Supreme Court
- Jess H. Dickinson (JD 1982), Associate Justice of the Mississippi Supreme Court
- Michael K. Randolph(JD 1974), Associate Justice of the Mississippi Supreme Court
- Ann Hannaford Lamar (JD 1982), Associate Justice of the Mississippi Supreme Court
- James W. Kitchens (JD 1967), Associate Justice of the Mississippi Supreme Court
- Malcolm B. Montgomery (c. 1930), Associate Justice of the Mississippi Supreme Court
- Lenore Prather (JD 1955), First female Mississippi Supreme Court Justice
- Reuben Anderson (JD 1967), First African-American Mississippi Supreme Court Justice and former Mississippi Bar President
- Patricia Jessamy (JD 1974), State's Attorney for Baltimore City
- Richard Scruggs (JD 1976), Trial lawyer
- Christopher McDaniel (JD 1997), Attorney, talk radio host, and Mississippi Senator
- Boyce Holleman (JD 1950), American war veteran, attorney, politician, and actor
- Charles K. Pringle (Class of 1954), Former Mississippi Republican state representative and Biloxi lawyer
- Charles W. Pickering (LLB 1961), Former Mississippi state senator and retired U.S. District Court Judge
- James L. Roberts Jr. (JD 1971), Associate Justice of the Mississippi Supreme Court
- James E. Winfield (JD 1972) civil rights lawyer, politician, and city prosecutor in Vicksburg, Mississippi
- Sarah Frances Hardy, illustrator and author
- Rubel Phillips, Republican gubernatorial nominee in 1963 and 1967 and attorney
