= List of justices of the Mississippi Supreme Court =

Following is a list of justices of the Mississippi Supreme Court.

These justices served in three different iterations of the court.

== Supreme judges of the State of Mississippi (1818–1832) ==
Justice	Began service	Ended service	Notes
John P. Hampton	1818	1829	Chief Justice, 1818–1829
William Bayard Shields	1818	1818	
John Taylor	1818	1820	
Powhatan Ellis	1818	1825	Service interrupted in 1818
Joshua G. Clarke	1818	–	
Walter Leake	1820	–	
Louis L. Winston	1821	1824	
Richard Stockton	1822	–	
Edward Turner	1824	1832	Chief Justice, 1829–1832
Isaac Caldwell	1825	–	
Joshua Child	1825	1831	
John Black	1826	1832	
George Winchester	1827	–	
William B. Griffith	1827	–	
Harry Cage	1828	–	
Isaac R. Nicholson	1828	–	
Alexander Montgomery	1831	–	
William L. Sharkey	1832	1832	
George W. Smyth	1832	1832	
Eli Huston	1832	1832	

== Judges of the High Court of Errors and Appeals of Mississippi (1832–1870) ==
Justice	Began service	Ended service	Post	Notes
William L. Sharkey	1832	1850	District 1, Post 1	Chief Justice, 1833–1851
Cotesworth P. Smith	1832; 1840; 1850	1838; 1841; 1863	District 2, Post 1	Chief Justice, 1851–1863
Daniel W. Wright	1832	1838	District 3, Post 1	
James F. Trotter	1838	1839	District 3, Post 1	
P. Rutilius R. Pray	1838	1840	District 2, Post 1	
John A. Quitman	1838	–		
Edward Turner	1840	1843	District 2, Post 1	
Reuben Davis	1842	1842	District 3, Post 1	
Alexander M. Clayton	1842	–	District 3, Post 1	
Joseph S. B. Thacher	1843	–	District 2, Post 1	
Collin S. Tarpley	1851	1851	District 1, Post 1	
William Yerger	1851	–	District 1, Post 1	
Ephraim S. Fisher	1852	–	District 3, Post 1	
Alexander Hamilton Handy	1853	1867	District 1, Post 1	Chief Justice, 1864–1867
William Littleton Harris	1858	1867	District 3, Post 1	
David W. Hurst	1863	–	District 2, Post 1	
Henry T. Ellett	1866	–	District 2, Post 1	
Thomas Shackelford	1868	–	District 3, Post 1	
Ephraim G. Peyton	1868	1870	District 1, Post 1	Continued in post-1870 court
Elza Jeffords	1868	–	District 2, Post 1	
George F. Brown	1868	–	District 2, Post 1	

== Justices of the Mississippi Supreme Court (1870–Present) ==
Justice	Began service	Ended service	Notes
Ephraim G. Peyton	1870	1876	Chief Justice, 1870–1876
Jonathan Tarbell	1870	1876	
Horatio F. Simrall	1870	1879	Chief Justice, 1876–1878
H. H. Chalmers	1876	1885	
Josiah Abigail Patterson Campbell	1876	1894	Chief Justice, 1882–1885 and 1891–1894
James Z. George	1879	1881	Chief Justice, 1879–1881
Tim E. Cooper	1881	1896	Chief Justice, 1885–1888 and 1894–1896
James M. Arnold	1886	1889	Chief Justice, 1888–1889
Thomas H. Woods	1889	1900	Chief Justice, 1889–1891 and 1896–1900
Albert H. Whitfield	1894	1910	Chief Justice, 1900–1910
Thomas R. Stockdale	1896	1897	
Samuel H. Terral	1897	1903	
S. S. Calhoon	1900	1908	
Jeff Truly	1903	1906	
J. H. Price	1903	1903	(James Houston)
Robert Burns Mayes	1906	1911	Chief Justice, 1910–1911
Robert Virgil Fletcher	1908	1909	
Sydney M. Smith	1909	1948	Chief Justice, 1912–1948
William Dozier Anderson	1910	-	
William Campbell McLean	1911	1912	
Sam C. Cook	1912	1924	
Richard F. Reed	1912	1915	
J. Morgan Stevens	1915	1920	
John Burt Holden	1916	1928	Died in office
Clayton D. Potter	1916	1917	
Eugene O. Sykes	1916	1924	
George H. Ethridge	1917	1941	
William Henry Cook	1920	1937	
James G. McGowen	1925	1940	
W. Joe Pack	1928	1928	
Virgil Alexis Griffith	1928	1949	Chief Justice, 1948–1949
Harvey McGehee	1937	1964	Chief Justice, 1949–1964
William G. Roberds	1940	1950	
Julian P. Alexander	1941	1953	
Lemuel Augustus Smith	1945	-	
Lee Davis Hall	1948	1961	
Malcolm B. Montgomery	1948	1950	
Richard Olney Arrington	1950	1963	
James Garrott Holmes	1950	1961	
John W. Kyle	1950	1965	
Percy Mercer Lee	1950	1966	Chief Justice, 1964–1966
James Plemon Coleman	1950	1950	
William Nathaniel Ethridge Jr.	1952	1971	Chief Justice, 1966–1971; died in office
Fred Lotterhos Sr.	1953	1954	
Robert G. Gillespie	1954	1977	Chief Justice, 1971–1977
Taylor H. McElroy	1960	1964	
Henry Lee Rodgers	1961	1976	
Robert Lee Jones	1962	1971	
Thomas Pickens Brady	1963	1973	Appointed to fill an unexpired term
Neville Patterson	1964	1986	Chief Justice, 1977–1986
Stokes Robertson Jr.	1966	1980	
William H. Inzer	1965	1978	
Lemuel Augustus Smith Jr.	1965	1982	
Robert Perkins Sugg	1970	1983	
Vernon H. Broom	1972	1984	
Harry G. Walker	1973	1987	Chief Justice, 1986–1987
Roy Noble Lee	1976	1993	Chief Justice, 1987–1993
Francis S. Bowling	1977	1985	
Kermit R. Cofer	1978	1986	
Armis E. Hawkins	1980	1995	Chief Justice, 1993–1995
Lenore L. Prather	1982	2001	Chief Justice, 1998–2001
Dan M. Lee	1982	1998	Chief Justice, 1995–1998
James L. Robertson	1983	1992	Appointed to fill an unexpired term
Michael D. Sullivan	1984	2000	
Reuben V. Anderson	1985	1990	
Joseph Ruble Griffin	1986	1988	
Joseph Stephen Zuccaro Jr.	1987	1989	
William Joel Blass	1989	1990	Appointed to fill an unexpired term
Edwin L. Pittman	1989	2004	Chief Justice, 2001–2004
Chuck McRae	1990	2004	
Fred L. Banks Jr.	1991	2001	Appointed to fill an unexpired term
James L. Roberts Jr.	1992	1999	
Michael P. Mills	1995	2001	Appointed to fill an unexpired term
Bill Waller Jr.	1996	2019	Chief Justice, 2009–2019
Kay B. Cobb	1999	2007	
Oliver E. Diaz Jr.	2000	2008	
James W. Smith Jr.	1994	2009	Chief Justice, 2004–2009
Charles Easley	2000	2008	
George C. Carlson Jr.	2001	2013	
James E. Graves Jr.	2001	2011	
Jess H. Dickinson	2004	2017	
Michael K. Randolph	2004	Present	Chief Justice since 2019
Ann Hannaford Lamar	2007	2017	
David A. Chandler	2008	2016	
Randy G. Pierce	2008	2016	
James W. Kitchens	2009	2025	
Leslie D. King	2011	Present	
Josiah D. Coleman	2013	Present	
James D. Maxwell II	2016	2025	
Dawn H. Beam	2016	2025	
Robert P. Chamberlin	2017	2025	
David M. Ishee	2017	Present	
Kenny Griffis	2019	Present	
David Sullivan	2025	Present	
Jenifer Branning	2025	Present	
Celeste Wilson	2026	Present	
Amanda Jones Tollison	2026	Present	

== See also ==
- Mississippi Territory § Judiciary
