= John Taylor (Mississippi judge) =

American judge (c. 1785–1820)

John Taylor (c. 1785 – May or June 1820) was a justice of the Supreme Court of Mississippi, which was then called the High Court of Errors and Appeals, from 1818 to 1820.

== Early life, education, and career ==
Taylor was born in West Chester, Pennsylvania, where his father was a small farmer and deputy sheriff. Taylor had a limited education, but became familiar with the law by attending court with his father, and began reading law at the age of eighteen. In 1804 he was licensed to practice and immediately made the river voyage to St. Louis, Missouri, to enter the practice of law. In 1805 he moved to New Orleans, but finding a crowded legal community, moved to Natchez, Mississippi, then part of the Mississippi Territory. Dunbar Rowland relates an account by J.F. H. Claiborne of Taylor's entry into the practice of law in Mississippi:

The May term of the Superior court was then in session. There was a criminal case pending, which from the character of the parties, excited peculiar interest. Young Taylor volunteered for the accused and displayed remarkable acuteness and dexterity in the examination of witnesses. His speech to the jury was rough but forcible. It betrayed his ignorance of grammar, but wonderful mental power. He obtained a verdict of acquittal, was immediately retained in a dozen cases, and in a few weeks had an extensive practice.

In 1808, Taylor was appointed adjutant of the territorial regiment of cavalry. He was elected to the territorial general assembly in 1813, and in 1817 to the constitutional convention that organized the territory for admission to statehood.

== Judicial service ==
The first session of the legislature in October 1817 was compelled to adjourn without electing judges, due to an outbreak of yellow fever. Territorial supreme court justice Walter Leake having been elected to serve in the United States Senate, Governor David Holmes appointed Taylor to succeed Leake on the territorial court. In January 1818, Taylor was elected by the legislature to serve as a judge of the supreme court for the second district. Taylor was one of five judges then appointed to the state supreme court, under the first constitution, along with Chief Justice John P. Hampton, William Bayard Shields, Powhatan Ellis, and Joshua G. Clarke. Thomas H. Somerville, in The Green Bag, reported that Taylor "was a lawyer of ability, and was held in high esteem as a judge".

== Personal life and death ==
Taylor was a lifelong bachelor. He "retired from the bench in 1820", and died at Natchez in May or June of that year. On June 13, 1820, the supreme court issued an order for the remaining members and other members of the bar to "wear crape on the left arm for the term of thirty days" in Taylor's honor. Taylor's personal property was sold by his estate in July 1820.

== See also ==
- List of justices of the Supreme Court of Mississippi

Political offices
Preceded by Walter Leake	Justice of the Supreme Court of Mississippi; 1818–1820	Succeeded by Walter Leake
