= George Winchester =

American judge (died c. 1851)

Personal details
- Born: 1794 Salem, Massachusetts, U.S.
- Died: February 1851 (aged 56–57)

George W. Winchester (1794 - February 1851) was a justice of the Mississippi's supreme court from 1827 to 1829.

He was born 1794 in Salem, Massachusetts, and graduated from Yale College in 1816. He and studied at Harvard Law School as a pupil of Judge John Story. He established a law practice in Natchez, Mississippi and served as a criminal court judge in Adams County, Mississippi.

He was a candidate for judge of the supreme court in February, 1827, to succeed Hampton, but the vote in the legislature was 19 to 16, for William B. Griffith. When the latter declined, the governor appointed Winchester, but the legislature, at its next session, gave the office, by a majority of one, to Harry Cage.

In the 1829 election, Winchester was the Whig Party nominee for governor, with Abram M. Scott as the nominee for lieutenant-governor. Winchester was elected to the Mississippi State Senate in 1836; he resigned in April, 1837, upon the seating of twelve representatives not provided for in the apportionment law, a previous senate having refused to recognize the house after a similar act. One of the foremost Whigs of the State, he was chairman of the committee that made the address of 1839, preparatory to the great campaign of 1840. In 1844 he was a representative of Adams county, but his politics, being a member of the party usually in a minority, did not afford him many official honors.

He presided over the Southern Rights convention held at Jackson in 1849 and wrote up its resolutions.

Winchester never married. Upon the occasion of his death in Natchez, Mississippi, aged about 59, in February 1851, the bar of Adams county, February 5, 1851, adopted resolutions testifying to his "calm, clearsighted understanding," and endearing virtues as a man. Foote wrote of him: "He was not an orator; but he spoke always in refined and polished language, and with impressive kindness and urbanity. I do not suppose that a single word of personal incivility, or of coarse revilement, ever passed his lips at the bar".

Political offices
Preceded by John P. Hampton	Justice of the Supreme Court of Mississippi; 1827–1829	Succeeded by Harry Cage
