= Dan M. Lee =

American judge (1926–2010)

Daniel McKinnon Lee Sr.

Chief Justice of the Mississippi Supreme Court
- In office 1995–1998
- Preceded by: Armis E. Hawkins
- Succeeded by: Lenore L. Prather

Justice of the Mississippi Supreme Court
- In office 1981–1998
- Preceded by: Stokes Robertson Jr.
- Succeeded by: Bill Waller Jr.

Personal details
- Born: April 19, 1926 Forrest County, Mississippi, U.S.
- Died: May 9, 2010 (aged 84) Madison, Mississippi, U.S.
- Spouse: Mary Alice Gray Lee
- Children: 2
- Parents: Buford Aaron Lee; Pherbia Anna Camp Lee
- Education: University of Southern Mississippi; Mississippi College School of Law
- Profession: Judge

Daniel McKinnon Lee Sr. (April 19, 1926 – May 9, 2010) was a justice of the Supreme Court of Mississippi from 1981 to 1998, serving as chief justice from 1995 to 1998.

== Early life, education, and military service ==
Born in Petal, Forrest County, Mississippi, to Buford Aaron Lee and Pherbia Anna Camp Lee, he graduated from Petal High School in 1944, and served as a pilot in the United States Navy during World War II, beginning his training as an aerial gunner at the naval air base in Jacksonville, Florida in 1944. He served until 1946, for a time stationed on the aircraft carrier USS Princeton. For many years after the war, he maintained and flew his own airplane. After the war, Lee attended the University of Southern Mississippi, and the Mississippi College School of Law in Jackson, Mississippi, entering the practice of law in 1948.

== Judicial service ==
While practicing law, Lee "decided he wanted to be a judge after practicing under a very rude federal court judge", believing that he could show people more understanding from the bench. In August 1968, Governor John Bell Williams appointed Lee, then president of the law firm of Ray, Lee, and Moore, to the State Oil and Gas Board. In 1971, Williams appointed Lee to serve as a County Judge, in a newly created seat in Hinds County, Mississippi. Lee was a county judge, and a state circuit judge for Hinds and Yazoo Counties, In 1979, he heavily criticized the Ross Barnett Reservoir, following a flood which caused heavy damage in Jackson, Mississippi, unsuccessfully seeking to have the county initiate a grand jury investigation into the matter, and also seeking, again unsuccessfully, to persuade the jurisdictions involved to withhold payments due to the water supply district. This involvement was raised as an issue when Lee ran for a seat on the state supreme court in 1980, as a Democrat seeking to succeed retiring justice Stokes Robertson Jr., but Lee handily defeated his Republican opponent, James Arden Barnett. Lee served from 1981 to 1998. He succeeded Armis E. Hawkins as chief justice in November 1995, with the expectation that Lee would being "a more conservative philosophy to the court's highest post", and would "push the court more in that direction — pro-family, pro-business, pro-death penalty, pro-tort reform". Lee declined to run for reelection in 1997, choosing to retire from the court at the beginning of the 1998 term.

In 2003, the town of Petal named its new court building after Lee.

== Personal life and death ==
Lee married Dr. Mary Alice Lee, a graduate of the University of Tennessee College of Medicine, with whom he had a daughter, Sharon, and a son, Danny. Mary was appointed to head the Hinds County Health Department in 1978.

Lee died from complications of diabetes and Parkinson's disease at the age of 84.

Political offices
Preceded by Stokes Robertson Jr.	Justice of the Supreme Court of Mississippi; 1981–1998	Succeeded by Bill Waller Jr.
