= Justice Cook =

Justice Cook or Cooke may refer to:

- Arthur Cook (Pennsylvania politician) (died 1699), associate justice and chief justice of the Supreme Court of Pennsylvania
- Charles A. Cooke (1848–1917), associate justice of the North Carolina Supreme Court
- Deborah L. Cook (born 1952), associate justice of the Ohio Supreme Court
- Eugene A. Cook (1938–2020), justice of the Texas Supreme Court
- George A. Cooke (1869–1938), associate justice and chief justice of the Supreme Court of Illinois
- Eugene Cook (Georgia judge) (1904–1967), associate justice of the Supreme Court of Georgia
- James Burch Cooke (1819–1899), associate justice of the Tennessee Supreme Court
- John Dillard Cook (1792–1852), associate justice of the Supreme Court of Missouri
- Lawrence H. Cooke (1914–2000), chief judge of the New York Court of Appeals
- Ralph Cook (born 1944), associate justice of the Alabama Supreme Court
- Sam C. Cook (1855–1924), associate justice of the Supreme Court of Mississippi
- Walter Cooke (Rhode Island judge) (fl. 1750s–1810s), associate justice of the Rhode Island Supreme Court
- William Henry Cook (1874–1937), associate justice of the Supreme Court of Mississippi
- William Loch Cook (1869–1942), associate justice of the Tennessee Supreme Court
- William Wilcox Cooke (died 1816), associate justice of the Tennessee Supreme Court

== See also ==
- Judge Cook (disambiguation)
- Justice Coke (disambiguation)
