= James Z. George =

American judge (1826–1897)

James George
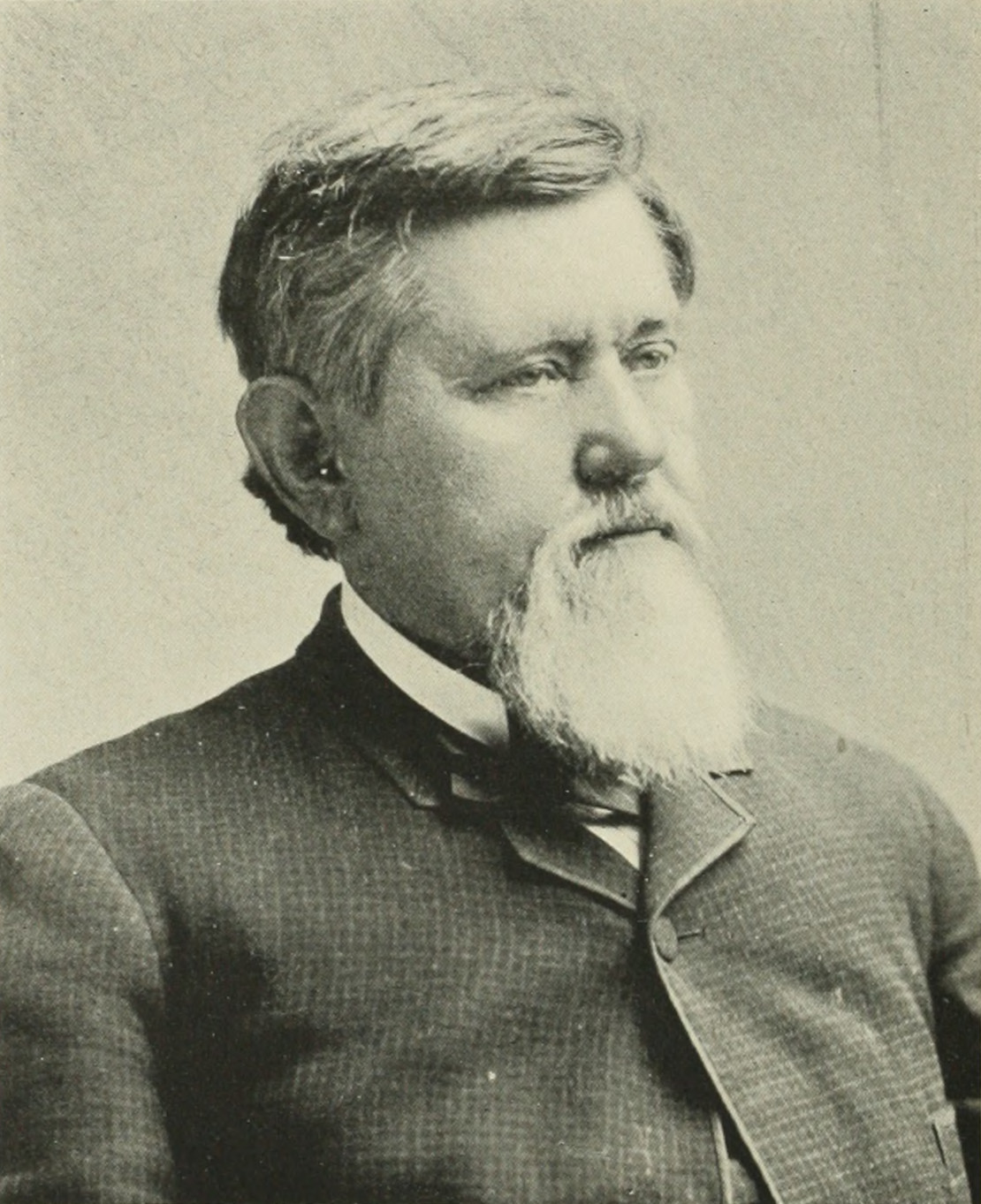

United States Senator from Mississippi
- In office March 4, 1881 – August 14, 1897
- Preceded by: Blanche Bruce
- Succeeded by: Hernando Money

Chief Justice of the Mississippi Supreme Court
- In office 1879–1881
- Preceded by: Horatio F. Simrall
- Succeeded by: Josiah A. P. Campbell

Personal details
- Born: October 20, 1826 Monroe County, Georgia
- Died: August 14, 1897 (aged 70) Mississippi City, Mississippi
- Party: Democratic
- Spouse: Elizabeth Brooks Young
- Children: 11 (including Lizzie George Henderson)

Military service
- Allegiance: Confederate States
- Service: Confederate States Army; Mississippi State Troops
- Rank: Colonel (CSA); Brigadier general (Mississippi)
- Unit: 20th Mississippi Infantry; 5th Mississippi Cavalry
- Battles/wars: American Civil War

James Zachariah George (October 20, 1826 – August 14, 1897) was an American lawyer, writer, U.S. politician, Confederate politician, and military officer. He was known as Mississippi's "Great Commoner".

== Early life ==
James Z. George was born in Monroe County, Georgia, to Joseph and Mary George. After his father died while he was still an infant, his mother remarried to Seaborn Durham in 1830. When he was eight, the family moved to Noxubee County, Mississippi and two years later, to Carroll County where he received his education in the common schools. He served as a private in the Mexican–American War under the command of Colonel Jefferson Davis and saw action in the Battle of Monterey. On his return, George read law and was admitted to the bar. In 1854 he became a reporter of the Supreme Court of Mississippi and, over the next 20 years, George prepared a 10-volume digest of its cases.

== Career ==
George was a slave owner. As a member of the Mississippi Secession Convention, George signed the Secession Ordinance. During the Civil War, George first served as Captain of Company C, 20th Mississippi Infantry Regiment, before resigning his commission in the Confederate Army to serve as a Brigadier general of the Mississippi State Troops in October, 1862. Frustrated by the disorganization of the State Troops and facing disrespect from Confederate officers, George left the State Troops service in November 1863, and rejoined the Confederate service as a colonel of the 5th Mississippi Cavalry. He was captured twice and spent two years in a prisoner of war camp, where he conducted a law course for his fellow captives. After the war, he returned to Mississippi and resumed the practice of law. In 1879 he was appointed to the Supreme Court of Mississippi and immediately was chosen as chief justice by his colleagues.

From 1881 until his death, George represented Mississippi in the United States Senate, where he was recognized for his skills in debate, helped frame the future Sherman Anti-Trust Act, introduced the bill for agricultural college experiment stations, and encouraged the establishment of the Department of Agriculture. Alarmed by the proposed Lodge Bill, which would have provided for federal supervision of elections, he campaigned in Mississippi for a constitutional convention in order to legally disenfranchise African-Americans, without resorting to violence, fraud, and other extralegal measures that had been used prior. He was a major figure during the Mississippi Constitutional Convention of 1890 itself, leading a hardline faction promoting the disenfranchisement of blacks without disenfranchising whites (as opposed to those who wanted to apply property and educational requirements to whites and blacks), and successfully defended the constitution before the Senate and the Supreme Court.

George died in Mississippi City, Mississippi, where he had gone for health treatment. He is buried, along with his wife, Elizabeth Brooks (Young) George, in Evergreen Cemetery in North Carrollton, Mississippi. George's wife Elizabeth was the granddaughter of Col. William Martin Jr. of Tennessee, and the great-granddaughter of General Joseph Martin, an early Virginia explorer and Revolutionary War commander.

In 1931, the state of Mississippi donated a bronze statue of George to the United States Capitol's National Statuary Hall Collection.

The J. Z. George High School in North Carrollton, Mississippi is named in his honor, which is less than 2 miles (3.2 km) from his burial place. In addition, George County, Mississippi, is also named in his honor.

== See also ==
- Battle of Collierville – Col. J. Z. George captured.
- List of members of the United States Congress who died in office (1790–1899)
- Fever Beach

U.S. Senate
Preceded by Blanche K. Bruce	U.S. senator (Class 1) from Mississippi; 1881–1897; Served alongside: Lucius Q. C. Lamar, Edward C. Walthall, Anselm J. McLaurin, Edward C. Walthall	Succeeded by Hernando D. Money
Political offices
Preceded by Horatio F. Simrall	Justice of the Supreme Court of Mississippi; 1879–1881	Succeeded by Tim E. Cooper
