= George F. Brown =

American judge (c. 1820–1893)

George F. Brown (c. 1820 – May 17, 1893) was a justice of the Supreme Court of Mississippi from 1868 to 1870.

Born and raised in Portage County, Ohio, Brown graduated from the college of Meadville, Pennsylvania, and began reading law in Warren, Ohio.

Following his tenure on the court, he moved to Kansas, and then to Omaha, Nebraska, where he engaged in the practice of law and "was highly esteemed by the legal profession".

Brown's wife died two years before his death, in Omaha, Nebraska, at the age of 73. He was survived by two sons and two daughters.

Political offices
Preceded by Elza Jeffords	Justice of the Supreme Court of Mississippi; 1868–1870	Succeeded by Horatio F. Simrall
