= Simrall =

Simrall is a surname. Notable people with the surname include:

- Horatio F. Simrall (1818–1901), American Confederate politician
- James Simrall (1909–1982), American football player
