= Chuck McRae =

American judge (born c. 1939)

Associate Justice of the Supreme Court of Mississippi
- In office 1990–2004
- Preceded by: William Joel Blass
- Succeeded by: Jess H. Dickinson

Personal details
- Born: Charles McRae c. 1939
- Party: Democratic
- Children: 1
- Education: Marietta College
- Profession: Lawyer, retired judge

Charles "Chuck" McRae (born c. 1939) is an American retired judge. He served as a justice of the Supreme Court of Mississippi from November 1990 to January 2004.

== Education ==
McRae graduated from Marietta College in Marietta, Ohio, and taught in Mississippi and Florida.

== Career ==
McRae worked as a lawyer in Gulfport, Mississippi.

He ran for a seat on the court occupied by Joel Blass, who had been appointed to a seat vacated by the death of judge Ruble Griffin. McRae saturated the media with campaign ads and toured the state to defeat Blass in the Democratic primary. McRae ran for reelection in 1994, winning by default after his initial Republican opponent withdrew to accept another office, and the substitution of another candidate was ruled to be in violation of the election statute.

He was censured in 1997. A 2003 Forbes article describes him as favoring plaintiffs and having received most of his campaign funding from plaintiff lawyers. It describes his successor, Jess Dickinson, as being more favorable to business.

== Personal life ==
In 2017, McRae was in an intensive care unit after a scuba diving accident. He has one daughter.

== See also ==
- List of justices of the Supreme Court of Mississippi

Political offices
| Preceded by Joel Blass | Justice of the Supreme Court of Mississippi; 1990–2004 | Succeeded by Jess H. Dickinson |
