= Justice Chalmers =

Justice Chalmers may refer to:

- David Patrick Chalmers, Chief Justice of the Gold Coast, 1876–1878 and Chief Justice of Guyana, 1895–1897
- Hamilton Henderson Chalmers (1833–1885), justice of the Supreme Court of Mississippi
- Mackenzie Dalzell Chalmers (1847–1927), Chief Justice of Gibraltar in 1894
