= Virgil A. Griffith =

American judge (1874–1953)

Chief Justice of the Supreme Court of Mississippi
- In office 1948–1949
- Preceded by: Sydney M. Smith
- Succeeded by: Harvey McGehee

Justice of the Supreme Court of Mississippi
- In office 1928–1949
- Preceded by: W. Joe Pack
- Succeeded by: Lee Davis Hall

Personal details
- Born: Virgil Alexis Griffith; August 10, 1874 Silver Creek, Mississippi, U.S.
- Died: October 5, 1953 (aged 79) Gulfport, Mississippi, U.S.
- Resting place: Evergreen Cemetery, Gulfport, Mississippi, U.S.
- Spouse: Florence Neville (died 1951)
- Children: 3
- Education: University of Mississippi
- Profession: Lawyer, judge

Virgil Alexis Griffith (August 10, 1874 – October 5, 1953) was a justice of the Supreme Court of Mississippi from 1928 to 1949, serving as chief justice from 1948 to 1949.

== Early life, education, and career ==
Born in Silver Creek, Lawrence County, Mississippi, he attended the University of Mississippi, gaining admission to the bar in Ellisville, Mississippi, in 1898. He then lived in Gulfport, Mississippi, where he developed a private practice that was described as "extensive".

== Judicial service ==
In 1920, Griffith was elected a chancellor in Gulfport, where he served until 1928. During this time, he wrote Griffith on Chancery, which was "a widely-quoted and highly respected authority" in the state. His 1928 campaign for a seat on the state supreme court became bitter and Griffith came in second place in the initial round of primary voting. He condemned a whisper campaign accusing him of being Catholic, a reviled religion in much of the south at that time. Nonetheless, Griffith defeated incumbent W. Joe Pack to win election to the court in 1928, and went on to win reelection in 1932 (defeating Harvey McGehee, who was later elected to another seat on the court) and in 1940.

He wrote a stirring dissent in a 1935 case where African American defendants were brutally tortured before confessing. The same year, he reportedly drafted the "Corrupt Practices Law of 1935" at the request of the governor, which imposed financial disclosure requirements on political candidates, including judges. He and his fellow Mississippi Supreme Court justices appear in a photo montage in the 1931-1933 Mississippi Blue Book.

== Personal life ==
Griffith married Florence Neville, daughter of circuit court judge James A. Neville. Griffith and his wife had two daughters and a son, and were married until her death in 1951. Griffith died in his home in Gulfport at the age of 79, and was interred in the Evergreen Cemetery in Gulfport.

Political offices
Preceded by W. Joe Pack	Justice of the Supreme Court of Mississippi; 1928–1949	Succeeded by Lee Davis Hall
