= Walter Raleigh Kibbe =

American politician

Walter Raleigh Kibbe (September 8, 1781 – April 22, 1864) was an American lawyer, judge, and politician.

== Early life and education ==
He was born in Somers, Connecticut, during the American Revolution. He graduated from Yale College in 1804, with a cohort that included John C. Calhoun, John P. Hampton, and Ezra Stiles Ely.

== Career ==
He was a lawyer by profession, having been admitted to the bar in 1807. He represented his native place in the Connecticut Legislature during the years 1828, '29, '31, '34, and '38, and in 1832 was a State Senator from the 20th district.

He held the office of Judge of Probate during a period of ten years, and was Postmaster from 1821 to 1828 In the latter year, he was one of the Presidential Electors. In the public and private relations of life he maintained a reputation for uprightness and independence.

== Personal life and death ==
His devotion to the study of the Bible is said to have been remarkable, especially in the later years of his life. He died in Somers, Conn., April 22, 1864, aged 82 years. Three of his six children survived him.
