= T. R. Stockdale =

American judge (1828–1899)

Thomas Ringland Stockdale
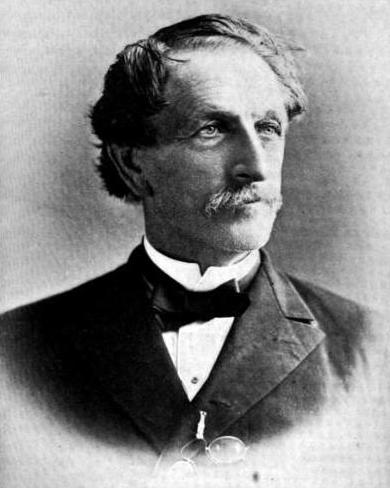

Member of the U.S. House of Representatives from Mississippi's 6th district
- In office March 4, 1887 – March 3, 1895
- Preceded by: Henry Smith Van Eaton
- Succeeded by: Walter McKennon Denny

Personal details
- Born: March 28, 1828 Waynesburg, Pennsylvania, U.S.
- Died: January 8, 1899 (aged 70) Summit, Mississippi, U.S.
- Resting place: Woodlawn Cemetery, Summit, Mississippi, U.S.
- Party: Democratic
- Education: University of Mississippi

Thomas Ringland Stockdale (March 28, 1828 – January 8, 1899) was an American politician and jurist. He was U.S. representative from Mississippi from 1886 to 1895, and a justice of the Supreme Court of Mississippi from 1896 to 1897. He was a Democrat.

== Biography ==
Born at West Union Church near Waynesburg, Pennsylvania, Stockdale graduated from Jefferson College (now Washington & Jefferson College) in 1856 and received a master's degree in 1859. He taught school in Pike County, Mississippi, received his law degree from the University of Mississippi in 1859 and practiced in Woodville, Mississippi.

During the Civil War, he served in the Confederate States Army. Enlisting as a private in the 16th Mississippi Infantry in 1861, he was promoted to lieutenant, captain and major, and served as regimental adjutant. He later commanded a battalion in the 4th Mississippi Cavalry Regiment and then served as the regiment's second in command with the rank of lieutenant colonel.

After the war Stockdale resumed the practice of law in Summit, Mississippi. He served as a delegate to the Democratic National Convention in 1868. He was also a Democratic presidential elector in 1872 and 1884.

Stockdale was elected to the United States House of Representatives as a Democrat in 1886 and served four terms, March 4, 1887 to March 3, 1895. He was an unsuccessful candidate for renomination in 1894.

In 1896 Stockdale was appointed by Governor Anselm J. McLaurin to fill a vacancy as a justice of the Mississippi Supreme Court and he served until 1897.

He died in Summit, Mississippi on January 8, 1899, and was interred in Summit's Woodlawn Cemetery.

Stockdale's home has been preserved by the Summit Historical Society, and the grounds of his home also contain a memorial to Stockdale.

U.S. House of Representatives
Preceded by Henry Smith Van Eaton	Member of the U.S. House of Representatives from Mississippi's 6th congressional district 1887-1895	Succeeded by Walter M. Denny
Political offices
Preceded by Tim E. Cooper	Justice of the Supreme Court of Mississippi; 1896–1897	Succeeded by Samuel H. Terral
