= W. Joe Pack =

American judge (1875–1939)

Justice of the Supreme Court of Mississippi
- In office 1928
- Preceded by: John Burt Holden
- Succeeded by: Virgil A. Griffith

Personal details
- Born: 1875; Lauderdale County, Mississippi, U.S.
- Died: November 13, 1939 (aged 63–64)
- Occupation: Lawyer, judge

W. Joe Pack (1875 – November 13, 1939) was an American lawyer and judge who served on the Supreme Court of Mississippi in 1928.

Born in Lauderdale County, Mississippi, Pack read law to gain admission to the bar. He worked in private practice in Laurel, Mississippi, and served as a county attorney.

In January 1928, Mississippi Supreme Court Justice John Burt Holden died, and that same month Governor Dennis Murphree appointed Pack to the seat. Pack ran for the seat in a special election later that year, and won the first round of primary election voting on August 21, 1928, but was defeated in the run-off election on September 11, 1928, by Chancellor Virgil A. Griffith. The following year, Pack was elected as a state circuit judge for Jones County, Perry County, and Forrest County.

Pack died from a sudden stroke during the first year of his third term on the circuit court.

Political offices
Preceded by John Burt Holden	Justice of the Supreme Court of Mississippi; 1928–1928	Succeeded by Virgil A. Griffith
