= Kermit R. Cofer =

American judge (1908–1989)

Kermit Cofer

Justice of the Supreme Court of Mississippi
- In office 15 March 1978 – 1980
- Preceded by: William Inzer
- Succeeded by: Armis Hawkins

Personal details
- Born: Kermit Roosevelt Cofer; 28 September 1908
- Died: 22 March 1989 (aged 80)
- Children: 1 son and daughter
- Education: University of Mississippi

Kermit Roosevelt Cofer (28 September 1908 – 22 March 1989) was a justice of the Supreme Court of Mississippi. He served on the court from 1978 to 1980. He had a wife, Inez, and two children.

== Career ==
Cofer was appointed to the court from Yalobusha County, Mississippi.

After William Inzer died on February 21, 1978, Cofer was appointed on March 15, 1978 by Governor Cliff Finch. Cofer lived in Water Valley, Mississippi. He had been a chancellor since 1959. He was unopposed in the 1979 election to fill the remaining year of Inzer's term. Cofer "declined to run for a full term, after being appointed to the court in 1978".

== See also ==
- List of justices of the Supreme Court of Mississippi

Political offices
Preceded by William Inzer	Justice of the Supreme Court of Mississippi; 15 March 1978 – 1980	Succeeded by Armis Hawkins
