= William Campbell McLean =

American judge (1854–1944)

William Campbell McLean (June 10, 1854 – December 14, 1944) was a justice of the Supreme Court of Mississippi from October 11, 1911, to May 10, 1912. He succeeded W. D. Anderson. McLean was appointed to the seat form Grenada County, Mississippi, and retired from the court the following year.

Political offices
Preceded by William Dozier Anderson	Justice of the Supreme Court of Mississippi; 1911–1912	Succeeded by Sam C. Cook
