= Robert Virgil Fletcher =

American judge

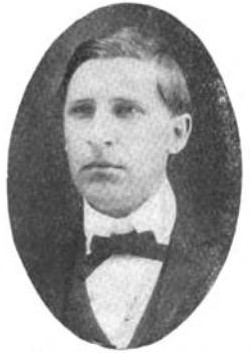

Associate Justice of the Supreme Court of Mississippi
- In office November 27, 1908 – May/June 1909

Attorney General of Mississippi
- In office March 26, 1907 – November 27, 1908

Personal details
- Born: September 27, 1869 Clermont County, Ohio
- Died: May 16, 1960 (aged 90) Washington, D. C.
- Party: Democratic
- Children: 3

Robert Virgil Fletcher (September 27, 1869 – May 16, 1960) was a justice of the Supreme Court of Mississippi from 1908 to 1909.

== Biography ==
Robert Virgil Fletcher was born on September 27, 1869, in Clermont County, Ohio, and moved with his family to Grant County, Kentucky, when he was one year old. He was the son of John M. Fletcher and Mary (Luman) Fletcher. Fletcher attended the common schools and the high schools of Taylorsville and Williamston, both in Kentucky. He later enrolled in the University of Mississippi in a post-graduate course, but he did not complete it. He then taught in some of Mississippi's public and high schools from 1893 to 1899. After studying law in the office of C. B. Mitchell, he was admitted to the bar in 1899.

== Career ==
Fletcher was appointed to the office of Assistant Attorney General of Mississippi on January 1, 1906. After the heretofore Attorney General's death, Fletcher was appointed to that position on March 26, 1907. He then ran for a full term, and was nominated by the Democratic Party in August 1907 and was elected in November of that year for the 1908–1912 term. On November 27, 1908, Fletcher was appointed to the Supreme Court of Mississippi. He left the Court about 6 months later. He then continued to practice law in Jackson, Mississippi. On February 10, 1911, he became the general attorney of the Illinois Central Railway Company. In 1920, Fletcher was appointed assistant general counsel to the United States Railroad Administration, and then became the general solicitor of the Illinois Central Railway Company. He then served as the railroad's vice president and general counsel. In April 1933, he became the vice president and general counsel of the American Association of Railway Executives (later the Association of American Railroads). Fletcher was elected to be its president in December 1946. He later resigned from this position to become its general counsel. He retired in 1952 at the age of 83.

== Personal life ==
Fletcher was a member of the Methodist Episcopal Church, and was also a member of the Freemasons, the Odd Fellows, and the Knights of Pythias. He married Etta Childers in Kentucky in 1893. They had three children, named Ernest Lamar, Louise, and Paul. Fletcher died on May 16, 1960, after a long illness.

Political offices
Preceded by S. S. Calhoon	Justice of the Supreme Court of Mississippi; 1908–1909	Succeeded by Sydney M. Smith
