= John Burt Holden =

American judge (1873–1928)

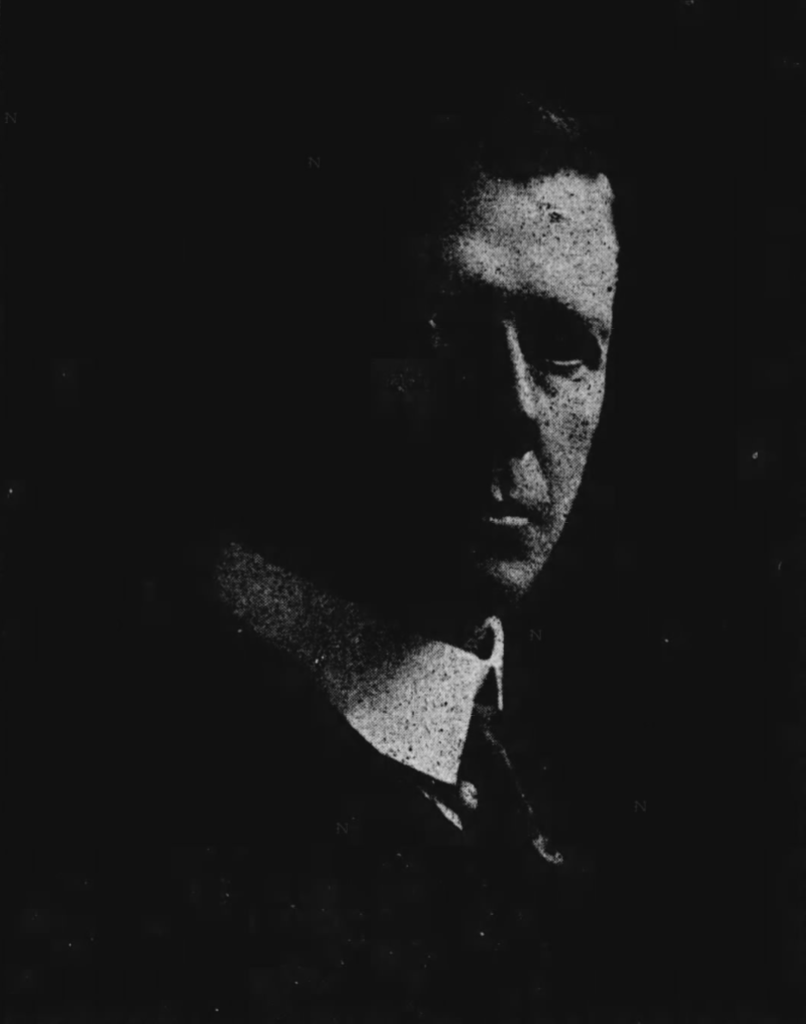

Justice of the Supreme Court of Mississippi
- In office 1916 – January 7, 1928
- Preceded by: Newly established seat
- Succeeded by: W. Joe Pack

Personal details
- Born: January 5, 1873; Franklin County, Mississippi, U.S.
- Died: January 7, 1928 (aged 55); Jackson, Mississippi, U.S.
- Political party: Democratic
- Spouse: Mary Cassedy (m. 1894)
- Children: 1
- Occupation: Lawyer, judge

John Burt Holden (January 5, 1873 – January 7, 1928) was a justice of the Supreme Court of Mississippi from 1916 until his death in 1928.

Born in Franklin County, Mississippi, to Dr. John Everly Holden and Laura (Curtis) Holden, he attended the public schools of Franklin County, and read law "in the offices of Col. T. R. Stockdale, C. E. Williams and Judge W. P. Cassady". Holden gained admission to the bar in Mississippi in June 1894. He practiced law in the small town of Summit, Mississippi, for nineteen years, and served as its mayor for twelve years, becoming active in the state Democratic Party. In 1911, Holden became the prosecuting attorney for Pike County, Mississippi, moving to McComb, Mississippi.

In May 1914, he was appointed as a circuit judge, and on January 26, 1916, he was appointed to one of three newly established seats on the state supreme court by Governor Theodore G. Bilbo. Circuit Judge William Houston Hughes initially declared as a candidate for the seat in the following election, but after testing the electorate, withdrew. Holden was then elected unopposed. Holden ran unopposed again in 1924, and died during that term.

On October 17, 1894, Holden married Mary Cassedy, with whom he had a son. Holden died of pneumonia at his home in Jackson, Mississippi, two days after his 55th birthday, and was succeeded on the court by the appointment of W. Joe Pack.

Political offices
Preceded by Newly established seat	Justice of the Supreme Court of Mississippi; 1916–1928	Succeeded by W. Joe Pack
