= Percy Mercer Lee =

American judge (14 Nov 1892-6 Feb 1969)

Percy Mercer Lee (c. 1893 – February 6, 1969) was a justice of the Supreme Court of Mississippi from 1950 to 1966, serving as chief justice from 1964 to 1966.

== Early life ==
Lee graduated from Mississippi College. He worked for several years as a school teacher, and then became an assistant attorney general for a year. He was elected mayor of Forest, Mississippi, in 1921, serving until 1924. From 1930 to 1939, he was a state district attorney.

== Judicial service ==
In 1938, Lee was elected judge of the Mississippi Circuit Court, taking office the following year.

In December 1947, Chief Justice Sydney M. Smith—the longest-serving member of the court—announced that he would not seek reelection. "Within ten days both Circuit Judge Percy Lee (age 55) of Forest and seventeen year Chancellor Malcolm B. Montgomery (age 56) of Yazoo City had qualified to run".

Chief Justice Smith died in July 1948. "The funeral was Monday, and on Wednesday, Governor Fielding Wright named Chancellor Montgomery to the vacancy". The election was held in 1948, with Lee debating Montgomery in advance of the Democratic primary; "A point of contention was whether Judge Montgomery had visited the governor to request the appointment, an allegation Lee made and Montgomery denied". Lee won the primary, but Montgomery remained on the court until the expiration of Smith's term in 1950.

Lee then ran unopposed for reelection in 1956, but declined to run for reelection a second time in 1964, remaining on the court until the end of his term in 1966, and serving as chief justice from 1964 to 1966.

== Personal life and death ==
Lee and his wife had eight children, all of whom attended Mississippi College. Lee's son, Roy Noble Lee, also later served on the state supreme court. Lee died at his home in Forest, Mississippi, at the age of 76.

Political offices
Preceded by Malcolm B. Montgomery	Justice of the Supreme Court of Mississippi; 1950–1965	Succeeded by Stokes Robertson Jr.
