= Charles Easley =

American judge

Charles D. "Chuck" Easley Jr. (born April 8, 1949) is a former Associate Justice on the Mississippi Supreme Court. He represented District 3 Place 2.

== Biography ==
Easley is the son of Charles D. Easley Sr., Lieutenant Colonel, United States Air Force (Retired) and Doris B. Easley, a retired teacher of Special Education, who reside in Chickasaw County, Mississippi.

He graduated from the University of Mississippi in 1972 with a Bachelor of Business Administration, Mississippi State University in 1976 with a Master's of Business Administration, University of Mississippi in 1979 with a Juris Doctor, and from the National District Attorneys College - Career Prosecutor's Course, Houston, Texas in 1980. Also, he is a graduate of the American Academy of Judicial Education: The Judge as Fact Finder & Decision Maker.

Before becoming a lawyer, Easley was a farmer and cattleman in Houlka, Mississippi.

Easley served as an Assistant District Attorney for the Third Judicial Court District from 1980 to 1983, Prosecutor of the Town of Caledonia, and Judge of the Town of Caledonia. He practiced law in Columbus, from 1983 to 2000.

He is a member of the Mississippi Bar Association, American Association of Retired Persons (AARP), the Lowndes County Bar Association, the American Bar Association (ABA), lifetime member of the National Rifle Association of America (NRA), Mason, Shriner, York Rite, Scottish Rite, the National Geographic Society, Audubon Society, and American Judges Association. He is a former member of Mississippi Municipal Judge's Association and Mississippi Prosecutor's Association.

Easley served on the Mississippi Supreme Court Security Committee, the Mississippi Supreme Court Library Committee, the Mississippi Supreme Court Human Resources Committee and as Chairman of the Mississippi Continuing Judicial Education Committee. He formerly served on the board of directors of the following organizations: Big Brothers and Big Sisters, American Cancer Society, and Mississippi Prosecutor's Association. Justice Easley teaches courses on ethics for both judges and attorneys.

Easley and his wife reside in Lowndes County, Mississippi. They are members of the Kolola Springs Baptist Church. He owns and operates a tree farm. He is the father of three children and four grandchildren.

== See also ==
- Mississippi Supreme Court

Political offices
Preceded by Lenore L. Prather	Justice of the Supreme Court of Mississippi; 2001–2008	Succeeded by
