= William H. Inzer =

American judge (1906–1978)

William H. Inzer (January 5, 1906 – March 1, 1978) was a justice of the Supreme Court of Mississippi from 1965 to March 1, 1978.

Born in Pontotoc, Mississippi, Inzer received his law degree from the University of Mississippi School of Law in 1931, and entered private practice in Pontotoc. In 1936, he was elected prosecuting attorney of Pontotoc County. He became a circuit court judge in 1940, and a chancery court judge in 1943, and served as an officer in the United States Army during World War II, from 1943 to 1946, attaining the rank of major. Following his service, Inzer returned to the judiciary.

Following the announced retirement of Justice Taylor H. McElroy in 1964, Inzer ran for the seat without opposition. Inzer ran unopposed for reelection in 1972.

Inzer died in office, at St. Dominic's Hospital in Jackson, Mississippi, where had gone after experiencing chest pains while going for a walk, at the age of 72.

== See also ==
- List of justices of the Supreme Court of Mississippi

Political offices
Preceded by Taylor H. McElroy	Justice of the Supreme Court of Mississippi; 1965–1978	Succeeded by Kermit R. Cofer
