= Harry R. Jeffords =

American lawyer (1855–1891)

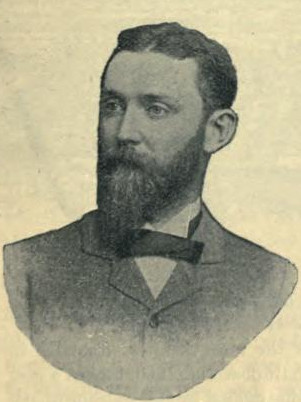
- Born: January 25, 1855; Dayton, Ohio
- Died: April 3, 1891 (aged 36); Tucson, Arizona
- Known for: Mississippi state senator, US Attorney in Arizona Territory

Harry R. Jeffords (January 25, 1855 – April 3, 1891) was a lawyer and politician who served as a United States Attorney from 1889 until his death. He also served in the Mississippi Senate.

== Biography ==
Jeffords was born in Dayton, Ohio on January 25, 1855. The son of Elza Jeffords, his father moved the family to Mississippi following the American Civil War. The younger Jeffords grew up in Natchez, Mississippi and was educated in Natchez's schools. He received his legal education at Columbia College's (now Columbia University) law school. He became the cotton register for Issaquena County, Mississippi in 1873, and then advanced to become Cotton Tax Collector for the county.

Jeffords was admitted to the Mississippi bar in December 1874. After obtaining his law license, he practiced law with his father, Elza Jeffords. He was elected to represent Issaquena, Sharkey, and Washington counties in the Mississippi State Senate in 1881. During his two year term, Jeffords served as chairman of the judiciary committee.

Jeffords moved to the Arizona Territory in 1884 for health reasons, and was elected Pima County district attorney in 1886. He was appointed United States Attorney for Arizona on May 24, 1889.

Jeffords contracted Mountain fever in July 1890. The illness triggered a relapse of his previous health issues. He died of Bright's Disease on April 3, 1891, leaving his wife and 3 children, including two daughters and one son.
