= Richard Stockton (Mississippi politician) =

American judge (c. 1792–1827)

Richard Stockton (c. 1792 – 1827) was a justice of the Supreme Court of Mississippi from 1822 to 1825, and Attorney General of Mississippi from 1825 to 1827.

His grandfather, also named Richard Stockton (1730–1781), was a signer of the United States Declaration of Independence, and his father, also named Richard Stockton (1764–1828), was a United States Senator for the state of New Jersey.

Stockton was born in New Jersey and studied law at Princeton University. Stockton was "described by historians as a high-strung lawyer who took top honors at Princeton University before emigrating from his native New Jersey to Mississippi in the 1820s". Stockton "joined the Mississippi Supreme Court before turning 31".

In one case, Stockton made a controversial ruling that was appealed and he was brought before the Mississippi House of Representatives. The trial at the bar of the House of Representatives was the only known instance of a judge in Mississippi being called upon to account for his decision. Stockton reportedly resigned from the court in 1825 due to the dispute "over whether the high court had the power to declare a law unconstitutional".

Two years after his resignation, Stockton was killed in a duel in New Orleans, Louisiana.

Political offices
Preceded by Joshua G. Clarke	Justice of the Supreme Court of Mississippi; 1822–1825	Succeeded by Joshua Child
