= James L. Roberts Jr. =

American judge (born 1945)

Justice of the Supreme Court of Mississippi
- In office 1992–1999
- Preceded by: James L. Robertson
- Succeeded by: Kay B. Cobb

Personal details
- Born: James Lamar Roberts Jr. June 8, 1945 (age 81) Pontotoc, Mississippi, U.S.
- Party: Democratic
- Education: University of Mississippi School of Law (JD)
- Profession: Judge

James Lamar Roberts Jr. (born June 8, 1945) is an American retired jurist who served as a justice of the Supreme Court of Mississippi from 1992 to 1999.

Born in Pontotoc, Mississippi, Roberts received a J.D. from the University of Mississippi School of Law in 1971, and served as the prosecuting attorney for Pontotoc County, Mississippi from 1972 to 1983. In 1984, Governor Bill Allain appointed him State Commissioner of Public Safety, a position he held for four years.

Roberts became a justice of the Supreme Court of Mississippi in 1992. In April 1999, Roberts resigned form his seat on the Supreme Court to campaign for the office of governor in that year's election. He sought the Democratic nomination, facing Lieutenant Governor Ronnie Musgrove. Roberts did little to build a gubernatorial platform and spent most of his time attacking Musgrove for his use of state vehicles for campaign activities. Musgrove won the August 3 Democratic primary, taking 57 percent of the vote to Roberts' 26 percent.

In January 2019, Roberts suffered a stroke. He tendered his resignation from his circuit court judgeship effective February 29, 2020.

== Works cited ==
- Watson, Robert P.; Campbell, Colton C., eds. (2003). Campaigns and Elections: Issues, Concepts, Cases. Lynne Rienner Publishers. ISBN 9781588261441.

Political offices
Preceded by James L. Robertson	Justice of the Supreme Court of Mississippi; 1992–1999	Succeeded by Kay B. Cobb
