= Roy Noble Lee =

American judge (1915–2015)

Roy Noble Lee (October 19, 1915 – January 21, 2015) was an American judge who served as Justice of the Supreme Court of Mississippi from 1976 to 1983, and as chief justice from 1987 to 1993.

Born in Madison County, Mississippi, Lee was the son of Percy Mercer Lee, who also served on the state supreme court. Lee received his bachelor's degree from Mississippi College and his law degree from Cumberland University in Lebanon, Tennessee. He was an FBI agent from 1942 to 1944 and served in the United States Navy Reserves during World War II. Lee was a state district attorney and then a state circuit court judge.

Following the resignation of Justice Henry Lee Rodgers in January 1976, Governor Cliff Finch appointed Lee to the seat, and Lee was sworn in on March 1, 1976. In the primary election that Summer, Lee "made a personal campaign through the district", and won more than 70% of the vote. He ran unopposed in the general election. Lee was reelected without opposition in 1984, and announced in 1992 that he would retire rather than running for a third full term.

Lee died in January 2015 at his home in Forest, Mississippi, aged 99.

Political offices
Preceded by Henry Lee Rodgers	Justice of the Supreme Court of Mississippi; 1976–1993	Succeeded by James W. Smith Jr.
