= William N. Ethridge =

American judge (1912–1971)

William Nathaniel Ethridge Jr.

Chief Justice of the Supreme Court of Mississippi
- In office 1966 – July 29, 1971
- Appointed by: Fielding L. Wright

Justice of the Supreme Court of Mississippi
- In office 1952–1971

Personal details
- Born: August 3, 1912 Columbus, Mississippi, U.S.
- Died: July 29, 1971 (aged 58) Jackson, Mississippi, U.S.
- Spouse: Laura Clark
- Children: 5
- Education: University of Mississippi; University of Southern California
- Occupation: Judge

William Nathaniel Ethridge Jr. (August 3, 1912 – July 29, 1971) was a justice of the Supreme Court of Mississippi from 1952 to 1971, serving as chief justice from 1966 until his death in 1971.

Born in Columbus, Mississippi, Ethridge was a second cousin of George H. Ethridge, who served as a justice on the state supreme court. Ethridge suffered from polio as a child, and required the use of a wheelchair. He attended the public schools of West Point, Mississippi, and received degrees from the University of Mississippi and the University of Southern California. He then engaged in private practice in Oxford, Mississippi, and Jackson, Mississippi, and taught at the University of Mississippi School of Law. In 1950, he published Modernizing Mississippi's Constitution.

In October 1950, Governor Fielding L. Wright appointed Ethridge, then 40 years old, to one of three newly-established seats on the state supreme court, likely making Ethridge the first judge appointed to the court with a physical handicap. Ethridge was then re-elected to the seat without opposition in 1952, and again in 1960. He became Chief Justice in 1966, winning re-election to that office in 1968, and serving in that capacity until his death.

== Personal life and death ==
Ethridge married Laura Clark of Webb, Mississippi, with whom he had five children.

He died at Baptist Hospital in Jackson at the age of 58, from an apparent heart attack while recuperating from surgery to remove his gallbladder.

Political offices
Preceded by Newly established seat	Justice of the Supreme Court of Mississippi; 1952–1971	Succeeded by Robert Perkins Sugg
