= 40th Mississippi Infantry Regiment =

Confederate infantry unit from Mississippi

- Active: 1862–1865
- Disbanded: May 4, 1865
- Country: Confederate States
- Allegiance: Mississippi
- Branch: Confederate States Army
- Type: Infantry
- Size: Regiment
- Battles: American Civil War: Battle of Iuka; Second Battle of Corinth; Vicksburg Campaign; Atlanta Campaign; Franklin-Nashville Campaign; Carolinas Campaign

The 40th Mississippi Infantry Regiment was a unit of the Confederate States Army in the American Civil War. Formed in 1862, the 40th Mississippi took part in the major campaigns of the Western theater, was captured at Vicksburg in 1863, and surrendered in April, 1865.

== History ==
The 40th Mississippi Infantry was mustered into service at Meridian in May, 1862. The regiment first saw action in North Mississippi at the Battle of Iuka in September, where Colonel Wallace Bruce Colbert of the 40th took command of General Lewis Henry Little's brigade after the general was killed in action. The regiment suffered 10 killed, 39 wounded, and 21 missing at Iuka. At the Second Battle of Corinth in October, Colonel Colbert again commanded the brigade during an unsuccessful attempt to recapture the fortified town held by Union forces. Losses of the regiment were 5 killed, 46 wounded, 16 missing, and the regimental battle flag was captured by Union troops of the 17th Iowa.

Following the Confederate defeat at Corinth, the 40th was transferred to Vicksburg, Mississippi to guard the strategic town against the advance of General Ulysses S. Grant's forces. The regiment was captured after the Siege of Vicksburg when the Confederate garrison surrendered on July 4, 1863. After the capitulation of Confederate forces, the 40th was paroled and exchanged. In late 1863 the regiment was sent to Georgia, and took part in the 1864 battles of the Atlanta Campaign. The 40th took especially heavy losses during the Battle of Peachtree Creek on July 20. Following the battles in Georgia and Tennessee during the subsequent Franklin-Nashville Campaign, the regiment reported only 67 men fit for duty by December 1864.

In spring 1865, the regiment was sent to North Carolina to join the Carolinas Campaign. On April 9th the remnants of the 40th regiment were consolidated with the 3rd and 33rd Mississippi Infantry regiments, and the Confederate army in North Carolina surrendered on April 26 and was disbanded on May 4.

== Commanders ==
Commanders of the 40th Mississippi Infantry:

- Colonel Wallace Bruce Colbert
- Colonel George P. Wallace, wounded at Peachtree Creek.
- Colonel James R. Childress
- Lieutenant Colonel Josiah A.P. Campbell

== Organization ==
Companies of the 40th Mississippi Infantry:

- Company A "Oak Bowery Invincibles" of Jasper County
- Company B, "Standing Pine Guards" of Leake County
- Company C, "Confederate Rebels" of Attala County
- Company D, "Attala Guards" of Attala County
- Company E, "Steam Mill Rangers" of Neshoba County
- Company F, "Mississippi Tigers" of Neshoba County
- Company G, "Dixie Rangers" of Leake County
- Company H, "Parrott Rifles"
- Company I, Captain J.W. McDonald's Company
- Company K, "Campbell Guards"

== See also ==
- List of Mississippi Civil War Confederate units
