= 1829 Mississippi gubernatorial election =

- August 3, 1829
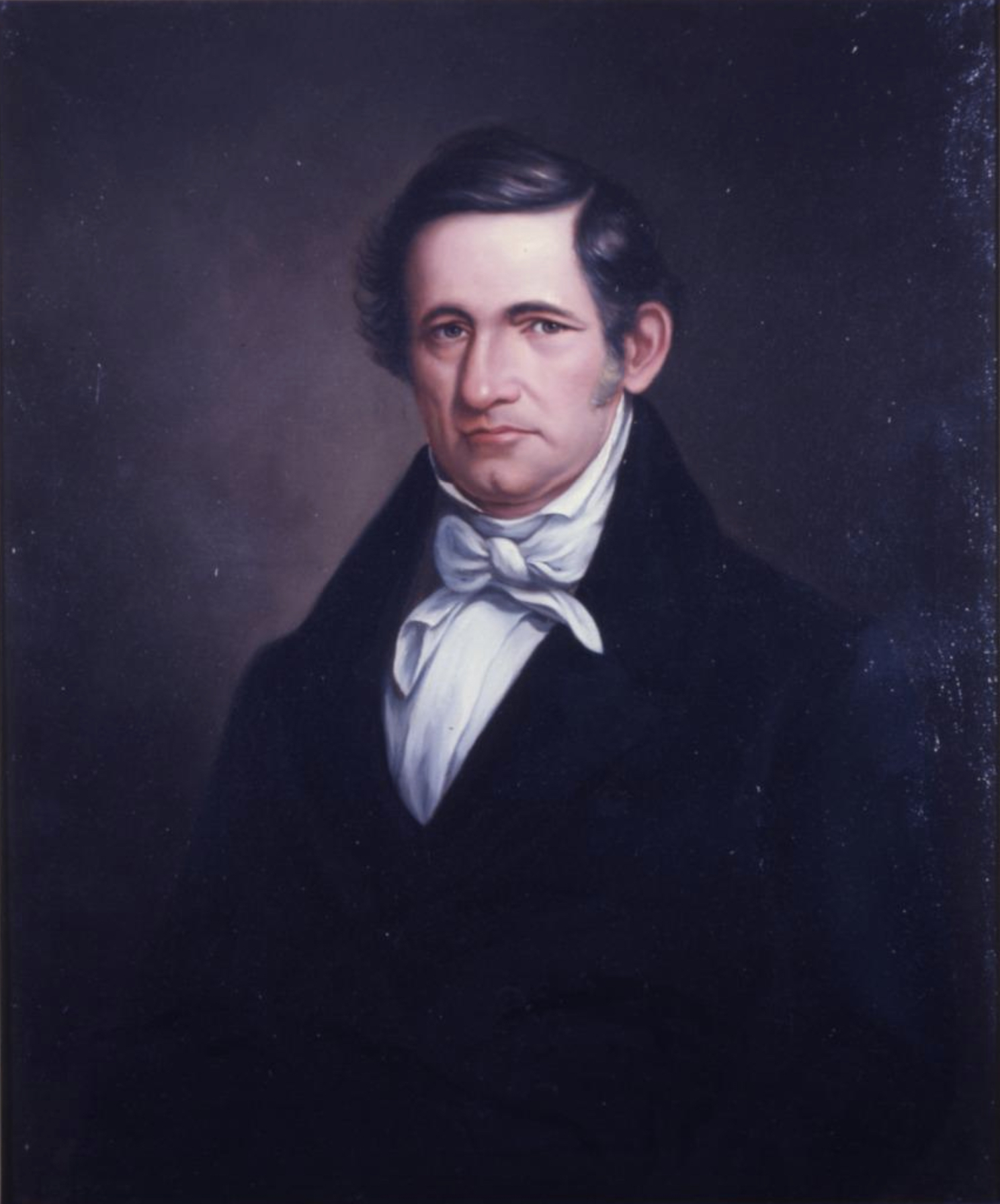

| Nominee | Gerard Brandon | George Winchester |
| Party | Democratic | National Republican |
| Popular vote | 7,344 | 3,991 |
| Percentage | 64.79% | 35.21% |
- County results Brandon: 50–60% 60–70% 70–80% 80–90% >90% Winchester: 50–60% 60–70% 70–80% No Votes
Governor before election
Gerard Brandon
Democratic-Republican
Elected Governor
Gerard Brandon
Democratic

The 1829 Mississippi gubernatorial election was held on August 3, 1829, to elect the governor of Mississippi. Gerard Brandon, a Democrat won against George Winchester, a National Republican. (Note: Glashan 1979 labels Winchester as a National Republican, as does John Raimo and Robert Sobel 1978, whereas Rowland 1907 labels him a Whig.)

== Results ==
Mississippi gubernatorial election, 1829
| Party | Candidate | Votes | % |
|---|---|---|---|
| Democratic | Gerard Brandon (incumbent) | 7,344 | 64.79% |
| National Republican | George Winchester | 3,991 | 35.21% |
| Total votes | | 11,335 | 100.00 |
| Democratic hold | | | |
