= Neville Patterson =

American judge (1916–1987)

Neville Patterson (February 16, 1916 – July 15, 1987) was a justice of the Supreme Court of Mississippi from 1962 to 1986, serving as chief justice from 1977 to 1986.

== Education, career, and military service ==
Patterson received his law degree from the University of Mississippi School of Law in 1939. He practiced law in Monticello, Mississippi, with his father, leaving to serve in the European theatre of World War II, where he was in the 3rd Armored Division. He won a Bronze Star Medal at the Battle of the Bulge, and attained the rank of captain.

== Judicial service ==
In August 1947, Patterson was elected a judge of the Chancery Court, where he remained for over 15 years, before winning election to the state supreme court.

In 1962, Patterson ran unopposed to succeed Justice Harvey McGehee on the state supreme court. Patterson ran unopposed for reelection in 1970 (reporting his only campaign expense as $200 to get his name on the ballot) and again in 1978. He became chief justice in 1977, and declined to run for another term in the 1986 election, retiring from office on June 30, 1986, and stating that he hoped to have more time to play golf.

== Personal life and death ==
Patterson married Catherine Stough of Jackson, Mississippi, with whom he had two daughters and a son. Patterson died following a heart attack on the golf course at the age of 71.

Political offices
Preceded by Harvey McGehee	Justice of the Supreme Court of Mississippi; 1964–1986	Succeeded by Joseph Ruble Griffin
