= Albert H. Whitfield =

American judge (1849–1918)

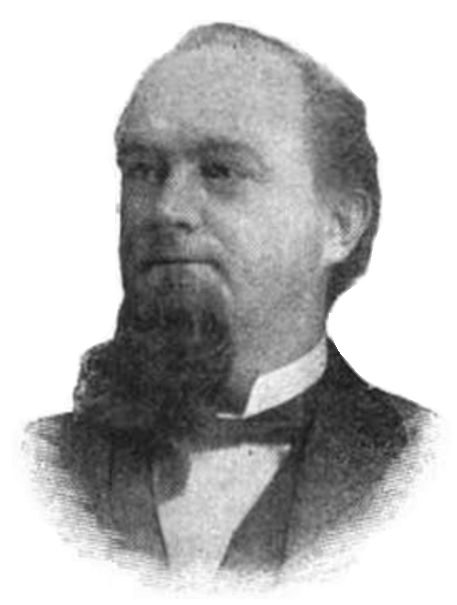
Albert H. Whitfield

Albert Hall Whitfield (1849–1918) was a justice of the Supreme Court of Mississippi from 1894 to 1910.

Born October 12, 1849, in Monroe County, Mississippi, to a family of Scotch-Irish descent, Whitfield was raised on a farm, and received an A.B. from Mississippi State University in 1871, with honors. He was an adjunct professor of Greek, Latin and history there, and obtained an A.M. in 1873 and a B.L. in 1874, from the same institution. He practiced law from 1874 to 1894 when he was made chair of law at the University of Mississippi. He held that position until 1894, when he was appointed to the Supreme Court by Governor John Marshall Stone. In 1895, he received the honorary degree of LL.D. from his alma mater. Whitfield died November 12, 1918, at the age of 69 in Jackson, Mississippi.

Political offices
Preceded by J. A. P. Campbell	Justice of the Supreme Court of Mississippi; 1894–1910	Succeeded by William Dozier Anderson
