= Thomas H. Woods =

American judge

Chief Justice of the Supreme Court of Mississippi
- In office 1896 – April 1, 1900

Associate Justice Supreme Court of Mississippi
- In office 1889–1895

Mississippi State Legislature
- In office 1872–1881

Personal details
- Born: Thomas Hall Woods; March 17, 1836 Glasgow, Kentucky, US
- Died: August 10, 1910 (aged 74) Meridian, Mississippi, US
- Education: Williams College

Thomas Hall Woods (March 17, 1836 – August 10, 1910) was an American judge, politician, and lawyer. He served in the Mississippi State Legislature and was the chief justice of the Supreme Court of Mississippi.

== Early life ==
Woods was born in Glasgow, Kentucky on March 17, 1836. His father was Reverend Henry Woods. In 1848 his family moved to Kemper County, Mississippi. He attended the public schools there.

Woods attended two sessions at Williams College in Massachusetts. While there, he was a member of the Fraternity of Delta Psi (St. Anthony Hall). After returning to Mississippi, he read law and obtained his license to practice.

== Career ==
Woods started practicing law in De Kalb, Mississippi in 1859. Woods was sent as a delegate to the convention that passed the ordinance of secession, of which body he was the youngest member. He served in the Confederate States Army and served as the Captain of Co. C, 13th Mississippi Infantry Regiment, receiving a serious wound at Malvern Hill.

In 1865, Woods was elected district attorney, reelected in 1866 but was removed from office by reconstruction officials. He was reelected in 1875 but resigned the next year to focus on his law practice. He was elected to the Mississippi State Legislature in 1871 and releected in 1875. He resigned in 1881 and declined to run for reelection. He also turned down an appointment as United States District Attorney from President Grover Cleveland.

In 1889, Governor Robert Lowry appointed Woods an associate justice to the Supreme Court of Mississippi, filling an unexpired term. In 1891, Governor John Marshall Stone appointed Woods to a nine-year term on the Supreme Court. Woods served as the chief justice from 1896 to 1900. At the end of his term, he retired.

He also served as the first president of Citizens National Bank, also known as Citizens Savings Bank which was started in 1888.

== Personal life ==
Woods lived in Kemper County, Mississippi until he moved to Meridian, Mississippi. He was married and had five sons and two daughters.

After he retired, Woods returned to Meridian. Woods died in Meridian Mississippi on August 10, 1910. He was buried in Rose Hill Cemetery in Meridian.

== See also ==
- List of justices of the Supreme Court of Mississippi
- List of St. Anthony Hall members

Political offices
Preceded by James M. Arnold	Justice of the Supreme Court of Mississippi; 1889–1900	Succeeded by S. S. Calhoon
