= William G. Roberds =

American judge (1884–1963)

William Greene Roberds (1884 – July 18, 1963) was an American lawyer and law professor who served as a justice of the Supreme Court of Mississippi from 1940 to 1960.

== Early life ==
Born in Prairie, Monroe County, Mississippi, in 1884, Roberds attended the public schools of Monroe County, and then attended Macon-Andrews Business College in West Point, Mississippi, and Mississippi Agricultural & Mechanical College (which later became Mississippi State University), before receiving a law degree from the University of Mississippi School of Law in 1910.

== Career ==
Roberds practiced law in West Point from 1910 to 1926, when he began teaching at the University of Mississippi. He resigned from teaching in 1930 to return to the practice of law, but in 1937 was asked to return as a professor of law. In 1940, Governor Paul B. Johnson Sr. appointed him to a seat on the Supreme Court of Mississippi vacated by the death of Justice James G. McGowen. Governor Johnson noted that Roberds was not among the many people who had applied for the position, but was chosen due to the Johnson's knowledge of Roberds as a reputable lawyer. Roberds was then reelected to the bench three times, in 1942, 1948, and 1956, without opposition. He served as a presiding justice for the court from 1949 until 1960, when he retired due to health concerns.

== Personal life and death ==
Roberds married Hattie Wooten of Jackson, Mississippi, with whom he had a daughter and a son.

Roberds died in Jackson at the age of 79.

Political offices
Preceded by James G. McGowen	Justice of the Supreme Court of Mississippi; 1940–1960	Succeeded by Taylor H. McElroy
