= Claremont (Port Gibson, Mississippi) =

Historic house in Mississippi, United States

- U.S. National Register of Historic Places
- Location within Mississippi Location within the United States
- Location: 366 Claremont Dr., Port Gibson, Mississippi
- Coordinates: 31°56′59″N 90°59′33″W
- Built: 1826
- Built by: Joshua G. Clarke
- Architectural style: Federal
- MPS: Port Gibson MRA
- NRHP reference No.: 79003418
- Added to NRHP: July 22, 1979

Claremont in Port Gibson, Mississippi is a historic Federal-style 1 1/2-story house that was listed on the National Register of Historic Places in 1979.

It is a center hall plan house with a gallery to the rear. It is surrounded by live oak trees with Spanish moss.

It was built in 1826 by Judge Joshua G. Clarke (d. 1828), who was the first judge appointed to the Mississippi Supreme Court.

It has been described as a "fine example of the late Federal style applied to a moderately sized country house".

Clarke's descendant J. Cavitt Clarke III wrote: "As a sign of his success, about 1826, Judge Clarke built Claremont, among the first of the larger homes near Port Gibson." (citing Ed Polk Douglas, ed., Architecture in Claiborne County, Mississippi: A Selective Guide (Jackson: Mississippi Dept. of Archives and History, 1974), page 72. )
