= J. Morgan Stevens =

American judge

Associate Justice of the Supreme Court of Mississippi
- In office May 27, 1915 – September 19, 1920

Personal details
- Born: May 27, 1876 Old Augusta, Mississippi, U.S.
- Died: November 7, 1951 (aged 75) Jackson, Mississippi, U.S.
- Party: Democratic Party
- Children: 7

John Morgan Stevens (May 27, 1876 – November 7, 1951) was an American lawyer and politician. He was a justice of the Supreme Court of Mississippi from 1915 to 1920.

== Early life ==
John Morgan Stevens was born on May 27, 1876, in Old Augusta, Mississippi. He was the son of Benjamin Stevens, a Captain in the Confederate States Army, and Lorena Annette (Breland) Stevens. Stevens attended the public schools of Augusta, and then attended Millsaps College. He graduated from the University of Mississippi with a B. A. in 1898 as the valedictorian of his class.

== Career ==
Stevens passed the Mississippi State Bar Examination, and then moved to Lexington, Mississippi, where he formed a law firm with L. M. Southworth. He moved to Hattiesburg in 1901, and formed a law partnership with his brother, H. Stuart Stevens. In 1912, Stevens was appointed to be the Chancellor of Mississippi's 8th District. After the Elective Judiciary Act was passed by the Mississippi Legislature in 1914, Stevens was put into an election for that office, which he won. On May 27, 1915, Stevens was appointed to a full term to the Mississippi Supreme Court by Governor Earl Brewer. Stevens resigned from the Court on September 19, 1920. After leaving the Court, Stevens continued practicing law, joining the Wells, Stevens, and Jones law firm in Jackson, Mississippi. In 1929, Stevens was chosen to be a member of a committee to recodify all of Mississippi's laws. In 1930, Stevens founded a law firm, known as Stevens and Stevens, with his son, John Morgan Stevens, Jr. After the younger Stevens' death in 1946, the firm became known as Stevens and Cannada.

== Personal life and death ==
Stevens married Ethel Featherstun on June 7, 1905. They had seven children, named John Morgan Jr. (1906 or 1907- 1946), Emily White (Stevens) McLachlan (1908-?), Joseph Johnston (1909-1911), Stuart Featherstun (died 1922), Ethelwyn Featherstun (Stevens) Hart (1915-2009), Phineas Nicholas (1917-2016), and Francis Bigelow (1921-2008). Stevens died on November 7, 1951, at 2 PM, at the Baptist Hospital in Jackson.

Political offices
| Preceded by Richard F. Reed | Justice of the Supreme Court of Mississippi; 1915–1920 | Succeeded by William Henry Cook |
