= Walter M. Denny =

American politician (1853–1926)

Member of the U.S. House of Representatives from Mississippi's 6th district
- In office March 4, 1895 – March 3, 1897
- Preceded by: T. R. Stockdale
- Succeeded by: William F. Love

Personal details
- Born: Walter McKennon Denny; October 28, 1853 Moss Point, Mississippi, U.S.
- Died: November 5, 1926 (aged 73) Pascagoula, Mississippi, U.S.
- Resting place: Machpelah Cemetery, Pascagoula, Mississippi, U.S.
- Party: Republican
- Other political affiliations: Democratic
- Education: Roanoke College; University of Mississippi School of Law
- Profession: Politician, lawyer

Walter McKennon Denny (October 28, 1853 – November 5, 1926) was a U.S. Representative from Mississippi.

Born in Moss Point in Jackson County, Mississippi, Denny attended the common schools and then Roanoke College in Salem, Virginia. In 1874, he graduated from what is now the University of Mississippi School of Law at Oxford. He was admitted to the bar and commenced practice in Pascagoula, the Jackson County seat of government on the Mississippi Gulf Coast. He served as clerk of the circuit and chancery courts of Jackson County from November 1883 until January 1, 1895. He was a delegate to the Mississippi Constitutional Convention of 1890.

Denny was elected as a Democrat to the Fifty-fourth Congress (March 4, 1895 – March 3, 1897) and was an unsuccessful candidate for renomination in 1896. He then switched to the Republican Party.

He resumed the practice of law in Pascagoula and for fifteen years was legal adviser to the Jackson County Board of Supervisors. He died in Pascagoula and is interred there at Machpelah Cemetery.

U.S. House of Representatives
Preceded by T. R. Stockdale	Member of the U.S. House of Representatives from Mississippi's 6th congressional district 1895–1897	Succeeded by William F. Love
