= Eugene O. Sykes =

American judge (1876–1945)

Eugene Octave Sykes Jr.
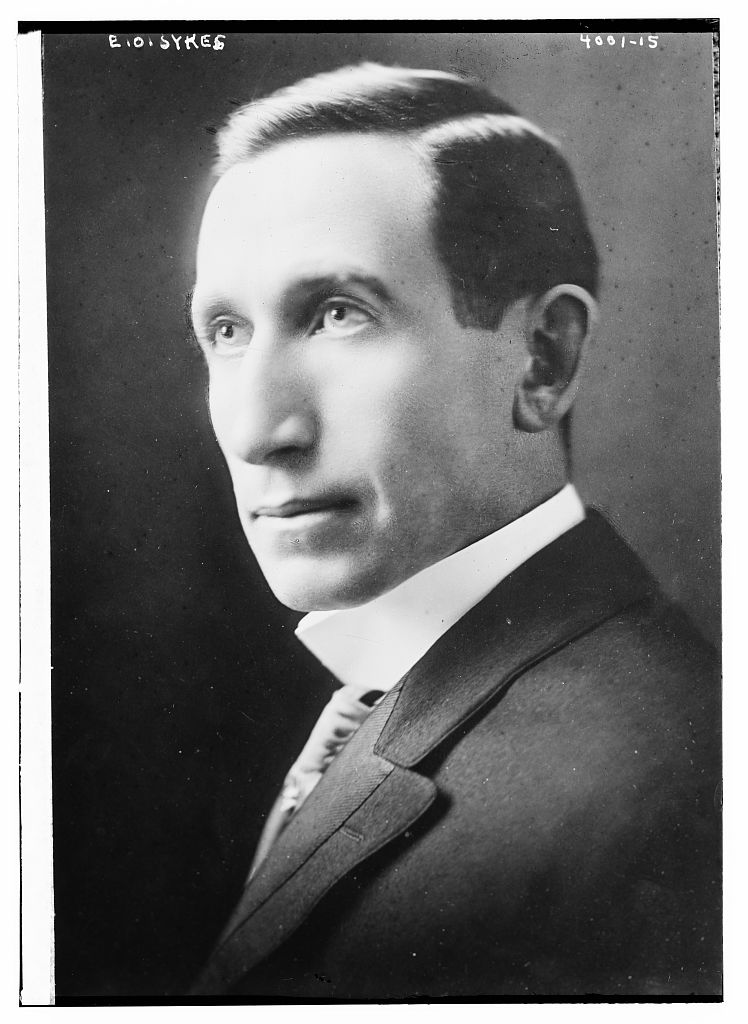
- Sykes in 1916

Mississippi Supreme Court Justice
- In office 1916–1924
- Appointed by: Theodore Bilbo

1st Chairman of the Federal Communications Commission
- In office July 11, 1934 – March 8, 1935
- President: Franklin Roosevelt
- Preceded by: Position Established
- Succeeded by: Anning S. Prall

Personal details
- Born: July 16, 1876 Aberdeen, Mississippi, U.S.
- Died: June 21, 1945 (aged 68) Washington, D.C., U.S.
- Party: Democratic
- Spouse: Malvina Scott (m. 1903)
- Children: 3
- Education: St. John's College High School; United States Naval Academy; University of Mississippi

Eugene Octave Sykes Jr. (July 16, 1876 – June 21, 1945) was a justice on the Mississippi Supreme Court. He served as the first chairman of the Federal Communications Commission from 1934 to 1935.

== Early life ==
Eugene Octave Sykes was born in Aberdeen, Mississippi, on July 16, 1876, to Eugene Octave Sykes Sr. and India Rogers. He attended St. John's College High School and the United States Naval Academy, and the University of Mississippi for his graduate degree.

== Career ==
Sykes served on the Mississippi Supreme Court from 1916 to 1924, appointed by Theodore Bilbo. Calvin Coolidge appointed him to the Federal Radio Commission in 1927. In 1932, he was chairman of the American delegation to the International Radio Conference in Madrid. In 1933, he was chairman of the delegation to the North American Radio Conference in Mexico City. He served as the first chairman of the Federal Communications Commission from 1934 to 1935. In 1939, he resigned from the commission.

Sykes then worked as a member of the Spearman, Sykes & Robinson law firm in Washington, D.C.

== Personal life ==
In 1903, Sykes married Malvina Scott. They had three children.

Sykes died of a heart attack on June 21, 1945, in Washington, D.C.

Political offices
Preceded by Newly established seat	Justice of the Supreme Court of Mississippi; 1916–1925	Succeeded by James G. McGowen
