= George H. Ethridge =

American judge (1871–1957)

George Hamilton Ethridge (February 26, 1871 – November 26, 1957) was a justice of the Supreme Court of Mississippi from 1917 to 1941. He lived in Meridian, Mississippi.

== Life and career ==
Born in Kemper County, Mississippi, Ethridge attended the Iron Springs Institute in Neshoba County, Mississippi, and Linden Academy in Linden, Tennessee, and taught school while reading law from 1892 to 1894. He gained admission to the bar in Mississippi, served in the Mississippi House of Representatives representing Kemper County from 1904 to 1908, and was thereafter an assistant attorney general until 1916, when he declared his candidacy for a seat on the state supreme court. Ethridge lead the vote in the August 15 Democratic primary, and won the September 5 runoff by a more substantial margin. Ethridge ran unopposed for reelection in 1924 and 1932, but in 1940, at the age of 69, faced a challenge from a younger opponent who highlighted Ethridge's age. Ethridge campaigned little, and was soundly defeated in the election. After leaving the court, Ethridge was again an assistant attorney general for several years.

Ethridge also wrote poetry, publishing a volume in 1919, and another in 1924.

== Personal life ==
On September 28, 1904, Ethridge married Lula Tann, with whom he had three sons and three daughters. Ethridge died in Jackson, Mississippi, at the age of 86, and was interred at Lakewood Memorial Park.

William N. Ethridge, who later served on the court, was the son of Ethridge's cousin.

Political offices
Preceded by Clayton D. Potter	Justice of the Supreme Court of Mississippi; 1917–1941	Succeeded by Julian P. Alexander
