= Statue of James Z. George =

Statue in the U.S. Capitol

James Zachariah George
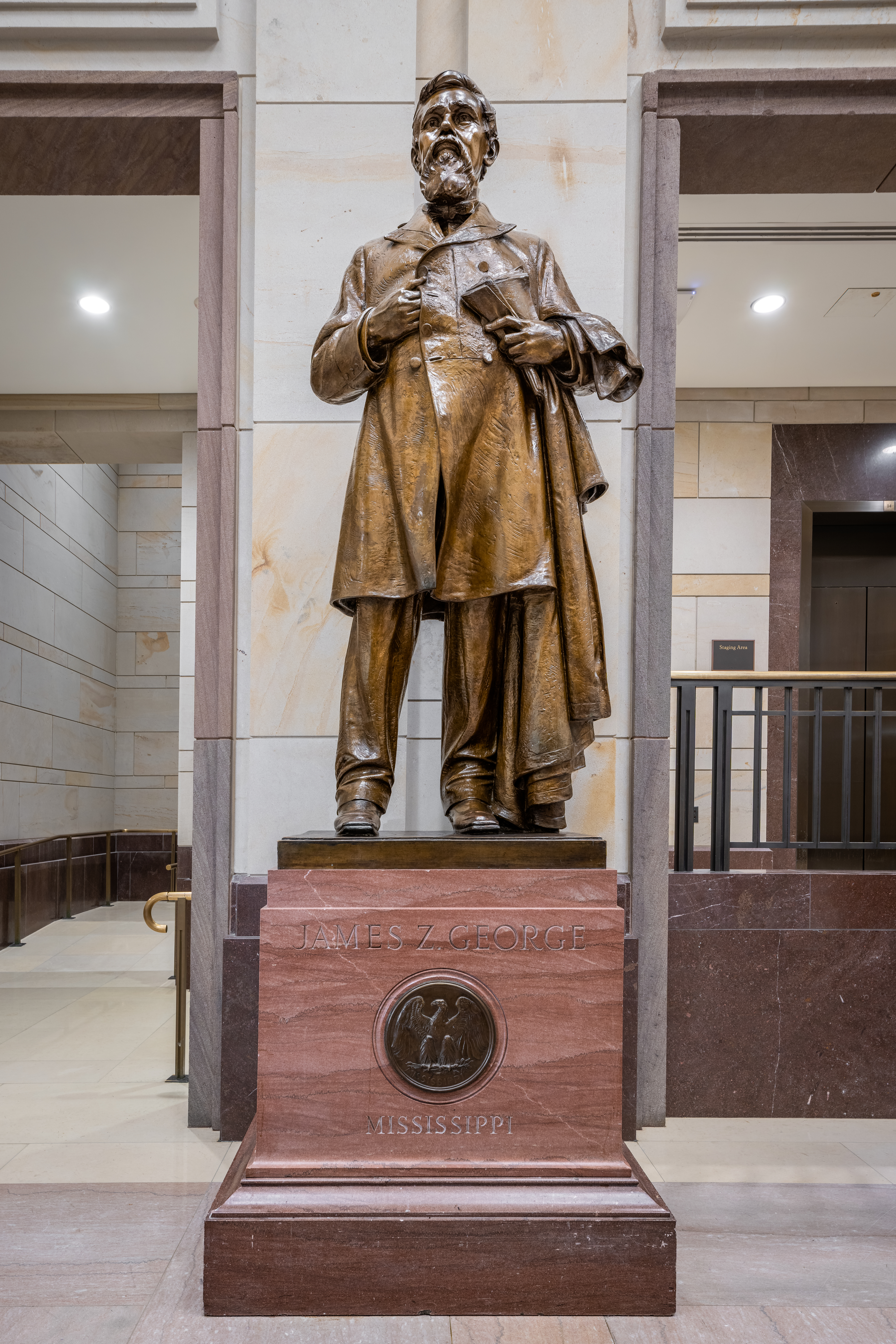
- The statue at the United States Capitol Visitor Center in 2023
- Artist: Henry Augustus Lukeman
- Medium: Bronze sculpture
- Subject: James Z. George
- Location: Washington, D.C., United States

James Zachariah George is a bronze sculpture depicting the politician and military officer of the same name by Henry Augustus Lukeman, installed at the United States Capitol's Visitor Center, in Washington, D.C., as part of the National Statuary Hall Collection. The statue was gifted by the U.S. state of Mississippi in 1931.

== See also ==
- 1931 in art
