= James M. Arnold =

American judge (1838–1897)

James Mason Arnold (October 21, 1838 – July 9, 1897) was an associate justice of the Supreme Court of Mississippi from 1885 to 1887, and chief justice from 1887 to 1889.

== Early life, education, and career ==
Born in Elbert County, Georgia to Wilton Jackson Arnold and Edna Ann Beall Arnold, the family moved to a Mississippi farm during Arnold's infancy. Initially educated at a free church-based school at Concord Church, Arnold gained the support of a teacher at a private high school who allowed Arnold to attend in exchange for Arnold teaching primary school classes there. The following year, he returned to Concord Church to teach, thereafter attended the University of Mississippi from 1855 until his graduation in 1858. Arnold then returned to teaching at Concord Church until the beginning of the American Civil War, when he enlisted in the Confederate States Army.

== Military, legislative, and judicial service ==
Arnold "served as a private in the Columbus Riflemen, Company K, Fourteenth Mississippi Regiment, throughout the war, except during the period of his imprisonment at Camp Douglas, Chicago, after the fall of Fort Donelson". In 1863, he was elected to represent Lowndes County, Mississippi, in the Mississippi House of Representatives, though he refused a proffered exemption from military service for members, continuing to serve in the army when the legislature was not in session. Following the war, he was elected to a second term in the legislature, and gained admission to the bar in Columbus, Mississippi.

Entering the practice of law, Arnold was reported to be "an able member of the Columbus bar". Arnold was the circuit judge of the first judicial district for a number of years, and according to one source, "bore the reputation of being one of the best the State ever had". On January 7, 1885, Governor Robert Lowry appointed Arnold to the state supreme court, and in 1887, Arnold became chief justice. He served in that capacity until October 1, 1889, when he resigned to resume the practice of law. After leaving the bench he settled in Birmingham, Alabama, and continued in practice until his death.

== Personal life and death ==
Arnold married Orline Lowry, daughter of Colonel Robert Lowry of Baldwyn, Mississippi, with whom he had two daughters. After Orline's death, Arnold married her sister, Florence Lowry, with whom he had two daughters and three sons, one of whom died in infancy.

Arnold died in Birmingham in the summer of 1897, at the age of 58, after a long illness. His remains were brought to Columbus, Mississippi, for interment.

Political offices
Preceded by H. H. Chalmers	Justice of the Supreme Court of Mississippi; 1889–1889	Succeeded by Thomas H. Woods
