= Alexander Montgomery (Mississippi lawyer) =

American judge (died 1878)

Alexander Montgomery (died September 7, 1878) was a Mississippi lawyer who served as a justice of the Supreme Court of Mississippi from 1831 to 1833.

Born in Natchez, Adams County, Mississippi, Montgomery was the son of a pioneers also named Alexander Montgomery, who had been chosen by President John Adams to serve on the Territorial council of Mississippi prior to statehood. The younger Montgomery was a pupil of George Poindexter and Edward Turner, and established a law practice in partnership with Samuel S. Boyd, a native of Maine; their firm "was for many years one of the leading ones of the State". Following the resignation of Judge Joshua Child from the state supreme court, Montgomery was one of several candidates put forth for the seat. Upon his election by the legislature to the circuit and supreme court of the state in November, 1831, defeating William L. Sharkey for that position "by a considerable majority", Montgomery became the first native Mississippian on the bench. His term upon the bench was cut short by the adoption of a new constitution and judicial system, which went into effect in 1833. After the end of his judicial service, he resumed the practice of the law in Vicksburg, Mississippi.

Montgomery appeared as a witness in an 1840 controversy, where he was described as "a distinguished and influential Whig, who adheres to the maxim that 'the private station is the post of honor'". In 1845, he was appointed to a committee of five jurists asked to prepare resolutions commemorating the death of U.S. Supreme Court justice Joseph Story.

Montgomery "was an active practitioner to a very advanced age", and died at the home of a Dr. Nailer, a relative, in Vicksburg, Warren County, Mississippi, when "far advanced in years".

== See also ==
- List of justices of the Supreme Court of Mississippi
- Selsertown, Mississippi

Political offices
Preceded by Joshua Child	Justice of the Supreme Court of Mississippi; 1831–1833	Succeeded by Court abolished
