= Tim E. Cooper =

American judge (1843–1928)

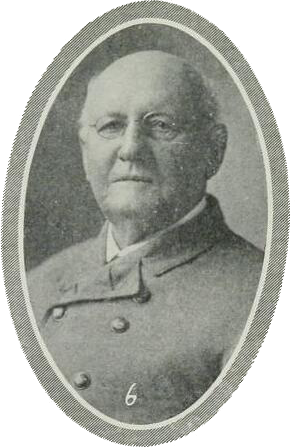
- Cooper in a 1914 publication
- Born: July 5, 1843; Copiah County, Mississippi, U.S.
- Died: February 7, 1928 (aged 84); Jackson, Mississippi, U.S.
- Education: University of North Carolina at Chapel Hill
- Occupations: Lawyer; judge

Tim E. Cooper (July 5, 1843 – February 7, 1928) was a justice of the Supreme Court of Mississippi from 1881 to 1896, serving stints as chief justice from 1885 to 1888 and from 1894 to 1896.

Born in Copiah County, Mississippi, Cooper entered the University of North Carolina at Chapel Hill. His studies were interrupted by the American Civil War, and aged seventeen he enlisted in the Confederate States Army. After the war, he studied law in the office of Judge Yerger and then with Messrs. King and Mayes at Gallatin. He was admitted to the bar at the in Gallatin in 1866. He moved to Crystal Springs and had successful practice until 1872 when he removed to Hazelhurst. There he developed "a large and lucrative practice", and was appointed to the supreme court in 1881, succeeding Chief Justice George. In 1896, he resigned his place, and moved to Memphis.

Cooper died at his home in Jackson, Mississippi, at the age of 86, following a year of declining health.

Political offices
Preceded by James Z. George	Justice of the Supreme Court of Mississippi; 1881–1896	Succeeded by Thomas R. Stockdale
