= William Dozier Anderson =

American judge (1862–1952)

Justice of the Supreme Court of Mississippi
- In office 1920–1944
- In office April 16, 1910 – October 1, 1911

Member of the Mississippi State Senate from the 39th district
- In office January 1908 – January 1912 Serving with George J. Leftwich

Personal details
- Born: July 20, 1862 Pontotoc County, Mississippi, Confederate States of America
- Died: January 6, 1952 (aged 89)

William Dozier Anderson (July 20, 1862 – January 6, 1952) was a mayor, state legislator, and judge in Mississippi. He served as a justice of the Supreme Court of Mississippi from 1910 to 1911 and from 1920 to 1944. He also served as a member of the Mississippi House of Representatives and the Mississippi State Senate. He was mayor of Tupelo, Mississippi from 1898 to 1906.

== Early life ==
William Dozier Anderson was born on July 20, 1862, in Pontotoc County, Mississippi. He was the son of Charles Wesley Anderson and Rebecca Ann (Dozier) Anderson. Anderson received his early education in Birmingham, Lee County, Mississippi. He then studied at Central University in Richmond, Kentucky and studied law at the University of Mississippi from 1881 to 1882. Anderson was admitted to the bar in 1883. He then moved to Tupelo, Mississippi, to practice law.

== Professional career ==
Anderson served as a City and County Attorney as well as an Attorney for the Mobile and Ohio Railroad. In 1897, Anderson was elected to replace the deceased A. N. Wilson representing the Lee and Itawamba Counties floater district in the Mississippi House of Representatives for the 1898 session. Anderson was an Alderman of Tupelo for one term, and he was its mayor from 1899 to 1907. He was appointed to be a Special Judge in the Mississippi Circuit Court in 1906.

In November 1907, Anderson was elected to represent the 38th District in the Mississippi State Senate for the 1908-1912 term. During this term, he was the chairman of the Senate's Judiciary committee. In 1910, he was a candidate to succeed Anselm J. McLaurin in the United States Senate, and received 23 votes from the legislature before withdrawing. On April 16, 1910, Governor Edmond Noel appointed Anderson to the Supreme Court of Mississippi. He resigned from this post on October 1, 1911, and continued practicing law in Tupelo. Then, he was a counsel to the Mobile & Ohio as well as the Cumberland Telephone and Telegraph Company. In 1920, Anderson was elected to the Supreme Court of Mississippi for the 1921-1929 term.

He and his fellow justices appear in a photo montage in the 1931-1933 Mississippi Blue Book.

== Personal life ==
Anderson married Lena Bell Clayton on January 27, 1886. They had 5 children, named Clayton, John Russell, Mary Agnes, Lena Bell, and Charles.

== See also ==
- List of justices of the Supreme Court of Mississippi

Political offices
Preceded by Albert H. Whitfield; Sam C. Cook	Justice of the Supreme Court of Mississippi; 1910–1911; 1920–1944	Succeeded by William Campbell McLean; Lemuel Augustus Smith
