= Thomas Shackelford =

American judge (died 1877)

Thomas G. Shackelford (died December 19, 1877) was an American judge. He was chief justice of the Supreme Court of Mississippi from 1868 to 1870.

He graduated from the law school at Transylvania University and settled in Mississippi. He was appointed to the bench in 1868 by General Adelbert Ames, military commandant. On February 25, 1868, General Alvan Cullem Gillem, who had been given post-Civil War command over a region including Mississippi, named Shackelford to the state supreme court, along with Elza Jeffords and Ephraim G. Peyton.

Elza Jeffords, of Issaquena County, also sat by appointment under military rule in 1868. The opinions of this tribunal are found in the forty-second volume of the Mississippi reports. Later justices criticized a case cited in that volume, Lusby v. Railroad Co., describing them "utterances of a tribunal appointed by a military satrap who then ruled in a prostrate commonwealth, and have no other binding authority upon us than that each case therein must be regarded as res adjudicata!"

He was circuit judge for several years after his retirement from the supreme bench. He died at the New Orleans, Louisiana, home of his son-in-law, Colonel George Mooreman, and his body was returned by special train car to Canton, Mississippi, for burial.

Political offices
Preceded by William Littleton Harris	Justice of the Supreme Court of Mississippi; 1867–1870	Succeeded by Jonathan Tarbell
