= William Joel Blass =

American judge

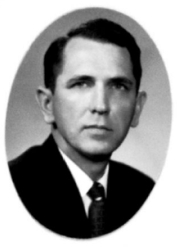
- William Joel Blass, State Representative in Mississippi Legislature, 1953-60.
- Born: October 19, 1917; Clinton, Mississippi, U.S.
- Died: October 23, 2012 (aged 95); Pass Christian, Mississippi, U.S.

William Joel Blass (October 19, 1917 – October 23, 2012) was an American war veteran, jurist, attorney, educator, and politician.

== Early life ==
Joel Blass was born in Clinton, Mississippi and was educated in Mississippi and Louisiana during the Great Depression. He graduated from Louisiana State University (LSU) School of Law in 1940 and received a commission as second lieutenant in the U.S. Army Infantry through the LSU ROTC program. During World War II, Blass served with the Third Army in Europe through VE Day. He received the Bronze Star and attained the rank of major. Blass returned to military service during the Korean War.

Blass moved to Wiggins in Stone County, Mississippi with his wife and daughters in 1947 to work in an established law practice, but soon started his own law firm. In 1953, Blass was elected to Stone County's legislative seat and served two terms, during the turbulent years of the racist White Citizen's Council, which he opposed. He retired from the State legislature in 1960. Blass continued with his law practice in Wiggins and also maintained a law office in Gulfport, MS.

== Teaching and judicial careers ==
During the 1960s, Blass served on the faculty at the University of Mississippi School of Law in Oxford, MS for 6 years. During that tenure, he was named Fellow in the American College of Trial Lawyers in 1965, and was awarded the Teacher's Excellence Award in 1969. After leaving the University, he settled into the practice of law on the Mississippi Gulf Coast. In 1989, Blass was appointed by the Governor of Mississippi to fill an unexpired term on the Supreme Court of Mississippi, but was defeated in a 1990 election for a full term on the Court.

Blass returned to the University of Mississippi School of Law in the Spring of 1992 to serve one semester in the Whitten Chair of Law and Government as distinguished lecturer on Admiralty law.

In 1995, a Mississippi Gulf Coast Chapter of the American Inns of Court was organized and named for three distinguished jurists, including Justice Blass, who "...typify the high ethical, professional, and personal lives that members of the bar would aspire to emulate". For the years 1999-2000, Justice Blass received the Mississippi State Bar Association's Lifetime Achievement Award.

== Personal life and death ==
Joel Blass has five children, nine grandchildren, and 26 great grandchildren.

He is buried in Saint Paul Catholic Cemetery, Pass Christian, Mississippi.

Political offices
Preceded by Ruble Griffin	Justice of the Supreme Court of Mississippi; 1989–1991	Succeeded by Chuck McRae
