= Stokes Robertson Jr. =

Mississippi Supreme Court justice (1913–2006)

Stokes V. Robertson Jr. (1913 – July 19, 2006) was a justice of the Supreme Court of Mississippi from 1966 to 1982.

Born in Jackson, Mississippi, Robertson received his undergraduate degree from Millsaps College in 1933.

In 2003, retired "state Supreme Court Justice Stokes Robertson of Jackson, now 90" reflected on the history of rambunctious justices serving on the court.

Stokes' nephew, Eugene Fair, was sworn in as a judge of the Mississippi Court of Appeals in January 2012, and wore one of Stokes' old robes following the ceremony.

Political offices
Preceded by Percy Mercer Lee	Justice of the Supreme Court of Mississippi; 1966–1982	Succeeded by Dan M. Lee
