= Joshua Child (judge) =

American judge (d. 1834

Joshua Child (1784 or 1785 – March 1, 1834) was a justice of the Supreme Court of Mississippi from 1825 to 1831.

Child was born in Lincoln, Massachusetts. Child was "well educated in the various schools of science before entering upon the study of law". He moved to Mississippi around the time of the organization of the state in 1817. He practiced law in Natchez, Mississippi, quickly gaining an excellent reputation, until his appointment to the state supreme court in 1825.

His opinions from the bench "were delivered in a lucid, terse, and forcible manner, free from all prolixity or effort at display, and resting upon the authority of the court rather than upon an array of reported decisions". As a justice, however, "he began to yield to a propensity to drink, which his sociability and natural ardor of temperament greatly aggravated". Various incidents were reported as arising from this. On one occasion it was said that "while under the influence of drink he became angry with some of the members of the bar, and to vent his rage, at the close of the term he ordered an adjournment, mounted his horse, and rode away without signing the minutes of the court". In September 1825 at Woodville, he engaged in a duel with General John B. Joor, "in which both parties were severely wounded". In 1828, the legislature convened a committee "to investigate the possibility of impeaching Child", but this did manifest any results. Ultimately, he "fell into habits of dissipation and resigned". Following Child's resignation from the court, Alexander Montgomery, William L. Sharkey, and Josiah C. Smith were put forth as candidates put forth for the seat, with Montgomery winning the vote.

Child never married, and "strongly manifested the peculiarities usually belonging to those who grow old in celibacy". He died aged 49 on March 1, 1834, not long after his resignation from the bench. He was buried in the Wintergreen Cemetery in Port Gibson, Mississippi. In 1844, the Mississippi Legislature enacted a personal bill to permit a "free man of color" named Berry, identified as "formerly the confidential body servant of the late Judge Joshua Child", to remain in that status in Hinds County, Mississippi.

== See also ==
- List of justices of the Supreme Court of Mississippi

Political offices
Preceded by Richard Stockton	Justice of the Supreme Court of Mississippi; 1825–1831	Succeeded by Alexander Montgomery
