= James G. McGowen =

American judge (1870–1940)

James Greer McGowen (September 19, 1870 – December 26, 1940) was a justice of the Supreme Court of Mississippi from 1925 until his death in 1940.

== Early life ==
James Greer McGowen was born on September 19, 1870, in Nesbitt, DeSoto County, Mississippi. He was the son of James Greer McGowen and Mary (Dean) McGowen. He attended public schools. He attended the University of Mississippi with a scholarship but did not graduate. He also attended Leddins' Business College for a year. After reading law, McGowen was admitted to the bar on August 11, 1893.

== Career ==
McGowen was an accountant and store manager in Eudora, Mississippi, before moving to Water Valley, Mississippi, in February 1894. In 1903, McGowen was elected to represent Yalobusha County as a Democrat in the Mississippi House of Representatives, and he served from January 1904 to January 1908.

He was the City Attorney of Water Valley, Mississippi, from 1906 to 1913. He was appointed to the office of Chancellor of Mississippi's 3rd Chancery Court district in 1913, was re-elected in 1914. He was re-elected without opposition in 1918 and 1922.

In 1916, Chancellor James G. McGowen, and District Attorney Rush H. Knox, of Houston challenged Justice Eugene O. Sykes, of Aberdeen. Sykes was appointed by Governor Bilbo to a new seat in January. McGowen came in a distant third in the August 15, 1916 primary. However, McGowan was elected to succeed Sykes in 1924, and was thereafter twice reelected.

== Personal life and death ==
McGowen married Lucia Lamar Richmond, with whom he had two sons and one daughter. He died following a stroke at the age of 70.

Political offices
Preceded by Eugene O. Sykes	Justice of the Supreme Court of Mississippi; 1925–1940	Succeeded by William G. Roberds
