= Judge Cook =

Judge Cook may refer to:

- Deborah L. Cook (born 1952), judge of the United States Court of Appeals for the Sixth Circuit
- George W. F. Cook (1919–2009), magistrate judge of the United States DIstrict Court for the District of Vermont
- H. Dale Cook (1924–2008), judge of the United States District Courts for the Eastern, Northern, and Western Districts of Oklahoma
- Julian A. Cook (1930–2017), judge of the United States District Court for the Eastern District of Michigan
- Marcia G. Cooke (1954–2023), judge of the United States District Court for the Southern District of Florida

== See also ==
- Justice Cook (disambiguation)
