= George W. Smyth (Mississippi judge) =

American judge

George W. Smyth (died 1832) was a justice of the Supreme Court of Mississippi in 1832.

Smyth graduated from Trinity College Dublin in Ireland.

He succeeded Harry Cage and served only during the December term of 1832, when the court was reorganized under the revised constitution. According to John Francis Hamtramck Claiborne, he was "on the threshold of a distinguished career when he died.

His death was announced to a meeting of the Mississippi Hibernian Society on December 19, 1832.

Political offices
Preceded by Harry Cage	Justice of the Supreme Court of Mississippi; 1832–1832	Succeeded by Court reorganized
