= James L. Robertson (Mississippi judge) =

American judge (1940–2023)

Associate Justice of the Supreme Court of Mississippi
- In office 1983–1992
- Preceded by: Robert Perkins Sugg
- Succeeded by: James L. Roberts Jr.

Personal details
- Born: James Lawton Robertson; July 30, 1940 Greenwood, Mississippi, U.S.
- Died: December 10, 2023 (aged 83) Jackson, Mississippi, U.S.
- Education: University of Mississippi (B.A.); Harvard Law School (J.D.)
- Profession: Lawyer, Judge

James Lawton Robertson (July 30, 1940 – December 10, 2023) was an American lawyer and judge who was a justice of the Supreme Court of Mississippi from 1983 to 1992.

== Biography ==
Robertson was born in Greenwood, Mississippi, and grew up in Greenville, Mississippi. He received a Bachelor of Arts degree from the University of Mississippi in 1962 and a law degree from Harvard Law School in 1965.

Robertson wrote Heroes, Rascals, and the Law. He taught at the University of Mississippi. He was appointed to the state supreme court by Mississippi governor William Winter.

Robertson died December 10, 2023, at the age of 83.

Political offices
Preceded by Robert Perkins Sugg	Justice of the Supreme Court of Mississippi; 1983–1992	Succeeded by James L. Roberts
