= Justice Coke =

Justice Coke may refer to:

- James Leslie Coke (1875–1957), associate justice of the Supreme Court of Hawaii
- Richard Coke (1829–1897), associate justice of the Supreme Court of Texas

== See also ==
- Justice Cook (disambiguation)
