= Francis S. Bowling =

American judge (1916–1997)

Justice of the Supreme Court of Mississippi
- In office August 1, 1977 – December 31, 1984
- Preceded by: Robert G. Gillespie
- Succeeded by: Reuben V. Anderson

Personal details
- Born: 1916
- Died: July 13, 1997 (aged 80–81)
- Cause of death: Suicide by gunshot
- Education: University of Mississippi
- Occupation: Judge

Military service
- Allegiance: United States
- Branch/service: United States Army
- Battles/wars: World War II

Francis S. Bowling (1916 – July 13, 1997) was a justice of the Supreme Court of Mississippi from 1977 to 1984.

Raised in Newton, Mississippi, Bowling received his undergraduate degree from the University of Mississippi and a law degree from the University of Mississippi School of Law.

He served in the U.S. Army during World War II in the Judge Advocate General department. He opened his law practice in Jackson in 1944.

Bowling served as chairman of the Mississippi Game and Fish Commission during Gov. Bill Waller's tenure. Waller also appointed him circuit judge of the 7th Judicial District, and in 1977 he was appointed to the Mississippi Supreme Court by Gov. Cliff Finch where he served until 1985.

== Judicial service ==
After Gillespie resigned, on August 1, 1977, Circuit Judge Francis Bowling of Jackson was appointed by Governor Finch. Bowling was unopposed in the election to fill the remaining two years of the term, and he ran unopposed for reelection to a full term in 1978. He resigned effective December 31, 1984.

He was succeeded by Reuben V. Anderson, the first African American to serve on the Mississippi Supreme Court.

== Death ==
Bowling died at his home of a self-inflicted gunshot wound at the age of 80.

Political offices
Preceded by Robert G. Gillespie	Justice of the Supreme Court of Mississippi; 1977–1984	Succeeded by Reuben V. Anderson
