= S. S. Calhoon =

American judge (1838–1908)

Justice of the Supreme Court of Mississippi
- In office 1900–1908
- Preceded by: Thomas H. Woods
- Succeeded by: Robert Virgil Fletcher

Personal details
- Born: Solomon Soladin Calhoon; January 2, 1838 near Brandenburg, Kentucky, U.S.
- Died: November 10, 1908 (aged 70) Jackson, Mississippi, U.S.
- Spouse: Margaret McWillie (m. 1865)
- Education: Cumberland University; University of Mississippi
- Occupation: Judge, attorney

Military service
- Allegiance: Confederate States of America
- Branch/service: Confederate States Army
- Rank: Lieutenant colonel
- Unit: 9th Mississippi Infantry Regiment
- Battles/wars: American Civil War

Solomon Soladin "S. S." Calhoon (January 2, 1838 – November 10, 1908) was an American judge and attorney. He was a justice of the Supreme Court of Mississippi from 1900 to 1908.

== Early life ==
Calhoon was born January 2, 1838, near Brandenburg, Kentucky, to parents Louisiana and George Calhoon. He went to school in Canton, Mississippi and attended Cumberland University in Tennessee.

He attended the University of Mississippi, graduating in 1867. While there, he was a member of the Fraternity of Delta Psi (aka St. Anthony Hall).

== Career ==
In 1857, he was the private secretary of Mississippi governor William McWillie. The year after, he was the secretary for the Mississippi Senate. From 1858 to 1859, he was a newspaper editor of the Yazoo Democrat and the States' Right Democrat.

During the American Civil War Calhoon served in the Confederate Army, eventually becoming lieutenant colonel of the 9th Mississippi Infantry Regiment.

In 1867, he was granted admission to the bar in Mississippi. He was the president of the 1890 constitutional convention, which created the 1890 Constitution of Mississippi. He became a justice of the Supreme Court of Mississippi from 1900 to 1908. He succeeded Thomas H. Woods, the previous Justice.

== Personal life ==
On December 21, 1865, he married Margaret McWillie. Calhoon died in Jackson, Mississippi, on November 10, 1908.

Political offices
Preceded by Thomas H. Woods	Justice of the Supreme Court of Mississippi; 1900–1908	Succeeded by Robert Virgil Fletcher
