= Fred Lotterhos =

American judge (1900–1954)

Fred Lotterhos Sr. (1900 – January 1954) was a justice of the Supreme Court of Mississippi from January 1953 to January 1954.

In January 1953, Lotterhos, from Hinds County, Mississippi, was appointed by Governor Hugh L. White to a seat on the state supreme court vacated by the death of Julian P. Alexander. Lotterhos himself died in January 1954, at the age of 54, and was replaced on the court by Robert G. Gillespie.

Political offices
Preceded by Julian P. Alexander	Justice of the Supreme Court of Mississippi; 1953–1954	Succeeded by Robert G. Gillespie
