= Johnny Morgan =

American politician (1947–2023)

Member of the Mississippi Senate from the 9th district
- In office January 1984 – January 1992
- Preceded by: Edgar Overstreet
- Succeeded by: Kay B. Cobb

Personal details
- Born: February 20, 1947 Jackson, Mississippi
- Died: May 17, 2023 (aged 76)
- Party: Democratic
- Education: University of Mississippi

Johnny Morgan (February 20, 1947 – May 17, 2023) was an American politician from Mississippi. He was a Mississippi State Senator from 1983 to 1991 serving as a member of the Democratic Party. He also served as a Lafayette County supervisor for eight years from 2003 to 2011

== Family and education ==
John Jordan "Johnny" Morgan was born on February 20, 1947, in Jackson to parents Eddie Mack and Beryl Jordan Morgan. He also had a brother named Chip Morgan.

He graduated from Oxford High School in 1965 and graduated from the University of Mississippi with a degree in Business Administration.

== Career ==
Morgan co-founded the Oxford based insurance company Morgan White Insurance in 1987. He also served in the North Mississippi Industrial Development Association and was affiliated with the Mississippi Board of Economic Development.

He also served as President of the Oxford-Lafayette County Chamber of Commerce, CEO of Johnny Morgan & Associates Realty Firm, as well as Vice President of Binswanger National.

== Career in politics ==
Morgan served two terms as state senator representing Calhoun, Lafayette, and Yalobusha counties from 1983 to 1991.

In 2003 he also served two terms as a member of the Lafayette County Board of Supervisors.

== Death ==
Morgan died in a plane crash in Washington County, Arkansas on May 17, 2023, at the age of 76.
