= William F. Love =

American politician (1850–1898)

Member of the U.S. House of Representatives from Mississippi's 6th district
- In office March 4, 1897 – October 16, 1898
- Preceded by: Walter M. Denny
- Succeeded by: Frank A. McLain

Member of the Mississippi State Senate
- In office 1889–1896

Member of the Mississippi House of Representatives
- In office 1884–1888
- In office 1878–1882

Personal details
- Born: William Franklin Love; March 29, 1850 Amite County, Mississippi, U.S.
- Died: October 16, 1898 (aged 48) Gloster, Mississippi, U.S.
- Resting place: Gloster Cemetery, Gloster, Mississippi, U.S.
- Party: Democratic
- Education: University of Mississippi
- Profession: Politician

William Franklin Love (March 29, 1850 – October 16, 1898) was a U.S. representative from Mississippi.

Born near Liberty in Amite County, Mississippi, Love attended the common schools and the University of Mississippi at Oxford. He engaged in agricultural pursuits. He served as member of the Mississippi House of Representatives from 1878 to 1882 and from 1884 to 1888. He served in the Mississippi State Senate from 1889 to 1896. He served as delegate to the State constitutional convention in 1890.

Love was elected as a Democrat to the Fifty-fifth Congress and served from March 4, 1897, until his death in Gloster, Mississippi, October 16, 1898. He was interred in Gloster Cemetery.

== See also ==
- List of members of the United States Congress who died in office (1790–1899)

U.S. House of Representatives
Preceded by Walter M. Denny	Member of the U.S. House of Representatives from Mississippi's 6th congressional district 1897–1898	Succeeded by Frank A. McLain
