= Jonathan Tarbell =

American judge (1820–1888)

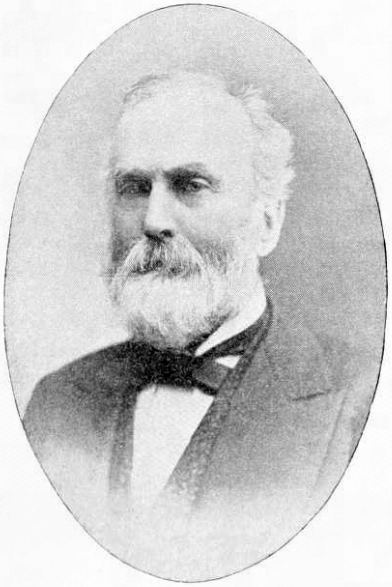

Justice of the Supreme Court of Mississippi
- In office 1870 – May 10, 1876

Personal details
- Born: c. 1820 Moriah, New York, US
- Died: March 13, 1888 Washington, D.C., US
- Political party: Republican
- Occupation: Lawyer, newspaper editor, military officer

Jonathan Tarbell (c. 1820 – March 13, 1888) was an American lawyer, newspaper editor, and military officer from New York who moved to Mississippi after the American Civil War and served as a justice of the Supreme Court of Mississippi from 1870 to May 10, 1876. He served as a Republican.

== Early life and career ==
Born and raised in Moriah, New York, Tarbell was the son of Daniel Tarbell, a Vermont-born landowner and operator of a large sawmill. Tarbell trained as a lawyer but pursued a career at newspapers, purchasing the Oswego Daily Times on September 3, 1836. Tarbell hired James N. Brown as editor of the paper, and sold the paper to Brown on August 23, 1854. Tarbell kept the printing equipment, however, and ran a printing shop at what had been the offices of the newspaper until 1861.

During the American Civil War, Tarbell enlisted as a private with the 24th New York Volunteer Infantry Regiment, but was quickly made a major. He was transferred to the 91st New York Volunteer Infantry, where he was critical of his commander Jacob Van Zandt, with whom he feuded and eventually succeeded in command of the regiment. Towards the end of the war, he was breveted brigadier general.

== Judicial and political service ==
He settled in Mississippi as a "political adventurer" during the Reconstruction era. Under the Mississippi state constitution of 1869, the state supreme court was reconfigured, with judges appointed by the governor with the advice and consent of the Mississippi Senate. Tarbell was appointed to the court by Governor James L. Alcorn, and "[t]he first bench thus constructed consisted of Chief Justice Peyton, Jonathan Tarbell and Horatio F. Simrall, associate justices". Tarbell served from the date of his appointment in 1870 until 1876, when the Democrats resumed control of the state, and Tarbell "left Mississippi on account of political persecution". He was succeeded on the court by a Democratic former Confederate officer, Josiah Abigail Patterson Campbell. Tarbell returned to Washington, D.C., and resumed the practice of law. In August 1876, he was appointed deputy comptroller of the United States Department of the Treasury by President Ulysses S. Grant.

Tarbell remained in Washington, D.C. until his death. He is buried at Arlington National Cemetery.

Political offices
| Preceded by Thomas Shackelford | Justice of the Supreme Court of Mississippi; 1870–1876 | Succeeded by Josiah Abigail Patterson Campbell |
