= William Henry Cook =

American judge (1874–1937)

William Henry Cook (September 15, 1874 – October 5, 1937) was a justice of the Supreme Court of Mississippi from 1920 to 1937.

== Early life, education, and career ==
Born in Philadelphia, Neshoba County, Mississippi, Cook attended the public schools of Neshoba County, and Lexington Normal College, before receiving his A.B. from the University of Mississippi in 1896, thereafter teaching for a time at St. Thomas Academy in Holly Springs, Mississippi. He received an LL.B. from the University of Mississippi in 1898, and entered the practice of law at Hattiesburg, Mississippi, with William H. Hardy, where Cook remained until his appointment to a seat on the twelfth circuit court district in May 1906. In the 1912 United States presidential election, Cook was a presidential elector for the Democratic Party, and later served as a district attorney for the twelfth circuit court district.

== Judicial service ==
On October 1, 1920, Governor Lee M. Russell appointed Cook to a seat on the state supreme court vacated by the early retirement of Justice J. Morgan Stevens. Cook's first appearance on the bench was in the fall term, on October 11, 1920. Cook was reelected to a full term in 1922 "by a very large majority", and ran unopposed for reelection again in 1932. He thereafter remained on the court until his death.

== Personal life ==
Cook married Bertha Bagby Beardslee, a descendant of Alabama Governor Arthur P. Bagby, on June 14, 1904, with whom he had a son and two daughters.

Cook died of a coronary thrombosis at his home in Jackson, Mississippi, at the age of 63.

Political offices
Preceded by J. Morgan Stevens	Justice of the Supreme Court of Mississippi; 1920–1937	Succeeded by Harvey McGehee
