= Kay B. Cobb =

American politician and judge (1942–2023)

Justice of the Supreme Court of Mississippi
- In office April 1, 1999 – May 1, 2007
- Appointed by: Kirk Fordice
- Preceded by: James L. Roberts Jr.
- Succeeded by: Ann Hannaford Lamar

Member of the Mississippi State Senate from the 9th district
- In office January 7, 1992 – January 2, 1996
- Preceded by: Johnny Morgan
- Succeeded by: Gray Tollison

Personal details
- Born: Kay Beevers Cobb; February 28, 1942 Cleveland, Mississippi, U.S.
- Died: May 26, 2023 (aged 81) Lenoir City, Tennessee, U.S.

Kay Beevers Cobb (February 28, 1942 – May 26, 2023) was an American politician and judge who served as a justice of the Supreme Court of Mississippi. She also served in the Mississippi Senate.

Raised on a farm in Cleveland, Mississippi, Cobb graduated from Cleveland High School before graduating from Mississippi University for Women in 1963. As her husband was in the U.S. Air Force, she then taught elementary school to children of military personnel for three years. She later worked for the Texas Employment Commission for five years as a job placement counselor for the handicapped and for people recently released from prison.

In 1975, Cobb enrolled in the University of Mississippi School of Law in Oxford, Mississippi, where she earned a Juris Doctor degree in 1978.

Cobb represented Mississippi's 9th senatorial district in the Mississippi Senate from January 1992 to January 1996. A Republican, she lived in Oxford and represented Lafayette County.

On April 1, 1999, Cobb was appointed to the Supreme Court of Mississippi by Governor Kirk Fordice, to complete the unexpired term of former Justice James L. Roberts Jr. Cobb was elected to a full term on the court in November 2000, and served until her retirement on May 1, 2007.

Cobb died at her home in Lenoir City, Tennessee, on May 26, 2023, at the age of 81.
