= Lenore L. Prather =

American judge (1931–2020)

Lenore Loving Prather (September 17, 1931 – April 11, 2020) was the Supreme Court of Mississippi’s first female justice and chief justice. Prather began her law career as an attorney and city court judge throughout the 1960s. After working as a Chancery judge in the 1970s, she became a Supreme Court judge for Mississippi in 1982. Prather was later promoted to Chief Justice in 1998 and held this position until 2001.

== Early life and education ==
Prather was born on September 17, 1931, in West Point, Mississippi, to Bryon Herald Loving, Esq. and Hattie Morris. She completed her post-secondary education at the Mississippi University for Women and graduated from the University of Mississippi Law School in 1955.

== Career ==
Upon earning her Juris Doctor, Prather joined her father's law practice. She then worked as an attorney with her husband Robert Brooks Prather, Esq. (whom she married in 1957) before her appointment as a Municipal Court Judge of West Point, Mississippi, in 1965. In 1971, Prather became the first female in the state to be appointed as a Chancery Judge (14th Chancery District). She was later appointed a justice of the Supreme Court of Mississippi by Governor William F. Winter, taking office on July 15, 1982. Prather was the first female to fulfill such a role, and she later achieved another historical feat by becoming the first female Chief Justice in 1998. She served in the aforementioned position during the duration of her time on the bench. In November 2000, Prather was defeated in her reelection campaign by Charles Easley, and she left office on January 5, 2001.

== Awards and honors ==
Prather was named to the University of Mississippi Alumni Hall of Fame in 1986 and the University of Mississippi School of Law in 2012. A portrait of her was included in the Supreme Court of Mississippi in 2011.

== See also ==
- Supreme Court of Mississippi
- List of justices of the Supreme Court of Mississippi
- List of first women lawyers and judges in Mississippi

Political offices
Preceded by Lemuel Augustus Smith Jr.	Justice of the Supreme Court of Mississippi; 1982–2001	Succeeded by Charles Easley
