= Sam C. Cook =

American judge (1855-1924)

Associate Justice of the Supreme Court of Mississippi
- In office May 10, 1912 – 1921

Member of the Mississippi House of Representatives from the Coahoma County district Panola County (1886-1888)
- In office January 1890 – January 1896
- In office January 1886 – January 1888

Personal details
- Born: January 13, 1855 Oxford, Mississippi, U.S.
- Died: February 15, 1924 (aged 69)
- Party: Democratic
- Children: 4

Sam C. Cook (July 13, 1855 – February 15, 1924) was a judge and state legislator in Mississippi. He served as a justice of the Supreme Court of Mississippi from 1912 to 1921.

== Early life ==
Sam C. Cook was born on July 13, 1855, in Oxford, Mississippi. He was the son of Milas J. Cook and Martha (Bumpass) Cook. Cook attended the public schools of Oxford, and graduated from the University of Mississippi with a Bachelor of Laws degree in 1878. He then began practicing law in Holmes County, Mississippi, before moving to Batesville, Mississippi, in 1880, and continuing to practice law there.

== Career ==
In 1885, Cook was elected to represent Panola County as a Democrat in the Mississippi House of Representatives and served in the 1886 session. In 1888, he moved to Clarksdale, Mississippi. Cook represented Coahoma County in the House in the 1890, 1892, and 1894 sessions. He was appointed attorney for the Yazoo Mississippi delta levee board in 1900 and served two years. He was appointed circuit Judge of the Eleventh district by former Governor Andrew H. Longino in 1902 and was reappointed by Governors James K. Vardaman Jr. and Edmond Noel.

He was appointed to Mississippi's supreme court by Mississippi governor Earl L. Brewer in 1912 after serving in the state legislature and for two terms as a circuit judge. In 1920, Brewer was challenged in his bid for reelection by William Dozier Anderson. In the closing days of the election, Anderson accused Cook of having become lazy and careless in his opinion writing, and defeated Cook in the primary.

== Personal life ==
Cook was a Methodist. He married Elizabeth Murphy on October 25, 1882, and they had four children, named Charles, Edwin, Marjorie, and Sam Jr.

== See also ==
- List of justices of the Supreme Court of Mississippi

Political offices
Preceded by William Campbell McLean	Justice of the Supreme Court of Mississippi; 1912–1921	Succeeded by William Dozier Anderson
