= Samuel H. Terral =

American judge (1835–1903)

Member of the Mississippi House of Representatives
- Governor: Robert Lowry

Justice of the Mississippi Supreme Court
- Governor: Anselm J. McLaurin
- Preceded by: Thomas R. Stockdale
- Succeeded by: James H. Price

Personal details
- Born: February 4, 1835 Jasper County, Mississippi, U.S.
- Died: March 20, 1903 (aged 68) Quitman, Mississippi, U.S.

Military service
- Allegiance: Confederate States of America
- Rank: Major
- Unit: Company C of the 37th Mississippi Regiment
- Battles/wars: American Civil War

Samuel Heidelberg Terral (February 4, 1835 – March 20, 1903) was a justice of the Mississippi Supreme Court from 1897 until his death in 1903.

== Early life and education ==
Born in Jasper County, Mississippi, Terral was educated in the county schools and graduated from the University of Mississippi and its law school. While there, he was a member of the Fraternity of Delta Psi (aka St. Anthony Hall). Terral held 2 people as slaves in 1860.

== Career ==
In January 1861 Terral attended the Mississippi Secession Convention, representing Clarke County where the state delegates would pass an Ordinance of Secession from the U.S.

Terral fought for the Confederates against the U.S. during the American Civil War, enlisting in Company C of the 37th Mississippi Regiment and served as its captain until 1863, when he was promoted to the rank of major. After the war he settled permanently at Quitman, Mississippi where he engaged in the practice of law, including working as a district attorney.

In 1882, after the end of Reconstruction, Terral became a member of the Mississippi House of Representatives. He then served as a circuit court judge until his 1897 elevation to the Supreme Court, by appointment of Governor Anselm J. McLaurin.

== Personal life ==
He died at Quitman on March 21, 1903.
