= Hamilton Henderson Chalmers =

American judge (1833–1885)

Hamilton Henderson Chalmers (1833 – January 4, 1885) was a justice of the Supreme Court of Mississippi from 1876 until his death in 1885. He was chief justice from 1881 to 1882.

Born in Halifax County, Virginia, Chalmers graduated from the University of Mississippi in 1853, and entered the practice of law in DeSoto County, Mississippi.

Chalmers was appointed to the supreme court in 1876 and reappointed at the end of his term. He died in 1885.

Political offices
Preceded by Ephraim G. Peyton	Justice of the Supreme Court of Mississippi; 1876–1885	Succeeded by James M. Arnold
