= Julian P. Alexander =

American judge

Justice of the Supreme Court of Mississippi
- In office 1941–1953
- Preceded by: George H. Ethridge
- Succeeded by: Fred Lotterhos Sr.

Personal details
- Born: Julian Power Alexander; December 7, 1887 Jackson, Mississippi, U.S.
- Died: January 1, 1953 (aged 65) New Orleans, Louisiana, U.S.
- Education: Princeton University (AB); University of Mississippi School of Law (LLB)

Julian Power Alexander (December 7, 1887 – January 1, 1953) was an American attorney and an associate justice on the Mississippi Supreme Court, where he served from 1941 until his death.

== Biography ==
Julian Alexander was the son of Charlton Henry Alexander and Matilda Macmillan Alexander. He received his secondary education in Jackson, Mississippi and attended Millsaps College and Southwestern Presbyterian University. He received an AB degree from Princeton University in 1908, and an LL.B. from the University of Mississippi School of Law in 1910.

In 1913, Julian married Corabel Wharton Roberts, with whom he had three children.

=== Political offices ===
- Assistant U.S. Attorney for the Southern District of Mississippi (1916-1919)
- U.S. Attorney for the Southern District of Mississippi (1919-1922)
- Circuit Court judge for the seventh District of Mississippi (1934-1939)
- Associate justice for the Mississippi Supreme Court (1941-1953)

=== Legal author ===
- Alexander, Julian P. 1953. Mississippi Jury Instructions. St. Paul: West Publishing Company.

== Death and legacy ==
Alexander died from coronary thrombosis in New Orleans, Louisiana, on January 1, 1953, while attending the Sugar Bowl football game at Tulane Stadium. He was interred at Cedar Lawn Cemetery in Jackson, Mississippi.

Alexander's portrait is part of the Mississippi Hall of Fame located in the Old Capitol Museum to honor his significant contributions to the state of Mississippi.
