= Joseph Ruble Griffin =

American judge (1923–1988)

Joseph Ruble Griffin (July 4, 1923 – December 29, 1988) was a justice of the Supreme Court of Mississippi from 1986 to 1988.

Born in Woodland, Mississippi, Griffin received a B.A. from the University of Mississippi, followed by a J.D. from the University of Mississippi School of Law in 1936. He served in the United States Army during World War II, from 1943 to 1946.

In 1972, Griffin was appointed to a seat on the state circuit court vacated by the elevation of Justice Harry G. Walker to the state supreme court. In 1986, Griffin ran for a seat on the state supreme court, winning the primary race 39,586 votes to opponent Jon Swartzfager's 36,480. Shortly thereafter, on June 30, 1986, Chief Justice Neville Patterson resigned, and Governor William Allain elevated Griffin by appointment to the vacant seat. Griffin died two years into his term.

Political offices
Preceded by Neville Patterson	Justice of the Supreme Court of Mississippi; 1986–1988	Succeeded by William Joel Blass
