= Harvey McGehee =

American judge (1887–1965)

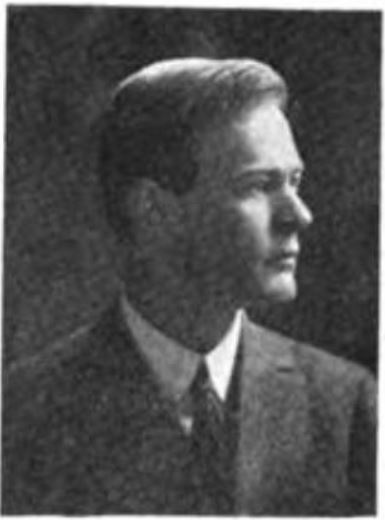
- c. 1917

Justice of the Supreme Court of Mississippi
- In office 1937–1964

Member of the Mississippi Senate from the 8th district
- In office January 1916 – January 1920

Personal details
- Born: June 11, 1887 Little Springs, Mississippi
- Died: November 2, 1965 (aged 78) Yazoo City, Mississippi
- Party: Democrat

Elijah Harvey McGehee (June 11, 1887 – November 2, 1965) was an American lawyer, jurist, and politician. He was a justice of the Supreme Court of Mississippi from 1937 to 1964. He also was a Democratic Mississippi state senator from 1916 to 1920.

== Biography ==
Elijah Harvey McGehee was born on June 11, 1887, in Little Springs, Mississippi. He was the son and ninth child of John Hiram McGehee, a Mississippi state senator, and Alice Katherine (Ford) McGehee. McGehee attended the schools of Little Springs, graduating from its high school in 1906. He graduated from the University of Mississippi School of Law and began practicing law in Monticello, Mississippi, in 1909. He served in the Mississippi Senate, representing the state's 8th senatorial district as a Democrat, from 1916 to 1920. In October 1937, Governor Hugh L. White appointed McGehee to a seat on the Supreme Court of Mississippi vacated by the sudden death of Justice William Henry Cook. He later served as chief justice of the court. After retiring in 1964, McGehee died on November 2, 1965, in Yazoo City.

Political offices
Preceded by William Henry Cook	Justice of the Supreme Court of Mississippi; 1937–1964	Succeeded by Neville Patterson
