= Joshua G. Clarke =

American judge (c. 1780-1828)

Joshua G. Clarke (c. 1780-1828) was one of the first justices on the Supreme Court of Mississippi.

Born c. 1780 in Maryland, and raised in Pennsylvania, Clarke was a member of the territorial legislature and of the constitutional convention as the representative of Claiborne county.

Clarke served on the Supreme Court of Mississippi from its first session in June 1818 until 1821. Among other rulings, Clarke judged that killing a slave was murder because slaves were "reasonable creatures", and voted that slaves became freedmen by having lived in the Northwest Territory under the Ordinance of 1787. In 1821, he resigned his position on the Supreme Court to become the first chancellor of the Mississippi Chancery Courts, serving until his death in 1828.

His home, Claremont (Port Gibson, Mississippi), built by him in 1826, is listed on the U.S. National Register of Historic Places.

== See also ==
- List of justices of the Supreme Court of Mississippi

Legal offices
Preceded by William Bayard Shields	Justice of the Supreme Court of Mississippi; 1818–1822	Succeeded by Richard Stockton
