= Armis E. Hawkins =

American judge (1920-2006)

Justice of the Supreme Court of Mississippi
- In office 1980–1995
- Preceded by: Kermit R. Cofer
- Succeeded by: Michael P. Mills

Personal details
- Born: Armis Eugene Hawkins; November 11, 1920
- Died: February 28, 2006 (aged 85)
- Children: 3
- Profession: Judge

Armis Eugene Hawkins (November 11, 1920 – February 28, 2006) was an American judge who served as a justice of the Supreme Court of Mississippi from 1980 to 1995.

== Life ==
He lived in Houston, Mississippi and graduated from its high school. He married and had two daughters and one son.

== Legacy ==
A section of road was named in his honor.

== See also ==
- List of justices of the Supreme Court of Mississippi

Political offices
Preceded by Kermit R. Cofer	Justice of the Supreme Court of Mississippi; 1980–1995	Succeeded by Michael P. Mills
