= Robert G. Gillespie =

American judge (1903–1983)

Robert Gill Gillespie (January 17, 1903 – January 31, 1983) was an FBI agent who participated in the capture of bank robber John Dillinger, and who later became a justice of the Mississippi Supreme Court.

Born in Madison, Alabama, Gillespie was raised in Mississippi. He briefly attended the University of Alabama Law School, but was unable to afford the program, instead dropping out and reading law to be admitted to practice in Mississippi, in 1927. He spent less than a year in the FBI, from 1934 to 1935, but during that time he participated in the ambush leading to the death of infamous bank robber John Dillinger. He left the FBI after contracting tuberculosis, from which he recuperated in Mississippi.

Gillespie practised law in Meridian, Mississippi with Thomas L. Bailey, and was appointed to the Mississippi Supreme Court in 1954, by Governor Hugh L. White, following the death of Fred Lotterhos Sr., who had himself been appointed upon the death of Julian G. Alexander. Gillespie became chief justice in 1971, holding that office until his retirement from the court on August 1, 1977. He was succeeded on the court by Francis S. Bowling. After his retirement from the court, Gillespie taught at the Mississippi College School of Law until 1981.

== Sources ==
- Mary Libby Payne, In Memoriam: Judge Robert G. Gillespie, Miss. C. L. Rev. vii (1983–1984)
