= Harry Cage =

American judge

Member of the U.S. House of Representatives from Mississippi's at-large district
- In office March 4, 1833 – March 3, 1835
- Preceded by: District created
- Succeeded by: David C. Dickson

Justice of the Supreme Court of Mississippi
- In office 1827–1832
- Succeeded by: George W. Smyth

Personal details
- Born: Henry Cage; April 5, 1795 Sumner County, Tennessee, U.S.
- Died: December 31, 1858 (aged 63) New Orleans, Louisiana, U.S.
- Resting place: Mississippi, U.S.
- Party: Jacksonian
- Spouse: Catharine N. Stewart
- Relatives: Harry T. Hays (nephew); John Coffee Hays (nephew)
- Profession: Politician, lawyer, judge

Henry Cage (April 5, 1795 – December 31, 1858) was an American lawyer and politician who served one term as a U.S. representative from Mississippi from 1833 to 1835.

== Biography ==
Born at Cages Bend of the Cumberland River, Sumner County, Tennessee, he moved to Wilkinson County, Mississippi, in early youth. He studied law and was admitted to the bar and commenced practice in Woodville, Mississippi. Harry married Catharine N. Stewart (1804–1829), the fourth child of Lieutenant Governor Duncan Stewart. He served as judge of the Supreme Court of Mississippi, from 1829 to 1832.

=== Congress ===
Cage was elected as a Jacksonian to the Twenty-third Congress (March 4, 1833 – March 3, 1835).

=== Retirement and death ===
He retired from the practice of law and settled on Woodlawn plantation in the parish of Terrebonne, near the town of Houma, in Louisiana.

He died while visiting in New Orleans, on December 31, 1858. His remains were interred in the cemetery of the Stewart family in Mississippi.

== See also ==
- Harry T. Hays, his nephew
- John Coffee Hays, another nephew
- List of justices of the Supreme Court of Mississippi

U.S. House of Representatives
Preceded by Seat created	Member of the U.S. House of Representatives from Mississippi's at-large congressional district March 4, 1833 – March 3, 1835	Succeeded by David Dickson
Political offices
Preceded by	Justice of the Supreme Court of Mississippi; 1827–1832	Succeeded by George W. Smyth
