= Josiah A. P. Campbell =

American judge (1830–1917)

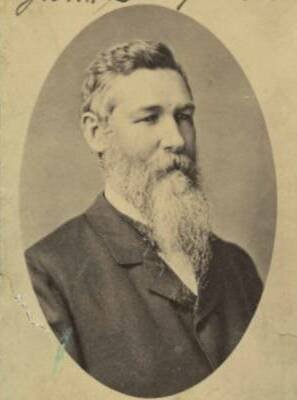

Deputy from Mississippi to the Provisional Congress of the Confederate States
- In office February 4, 1861 – February 17, 1862
- Preceded by: New constituency
- Succeeded by: Constituency abolished

Chief Justice of the Mississippi Supreme Court
- In office 1891–1894
- Succeeded by: Albert H. Whitfield

Associate Justice of the Mississippi Supreme Court
- In office 1876–1891
- Preceded by: Jonathan Tarbell

Speaker of the Mississippi House of Representatives
- In office 1859–1860

President pro tempore of the Provisional Congress of the Confederate States
- In office 1861–1861
- In office 1862–1862

Personal details
- Born: March 2, 1830 Lancaster District, South Carolina, U.S.
- Died: January 10, 1917 (aged 86) Hinds County, Mississippi, U.S.
- Resting place: Greenwood Cemetery, Jackson, Mississippi, U.S.
- Spouse: Eugenia Nash

Military service
- Allegiance: Confederate States
- Branch/service: Confederate States Army
- Years of service: 1861–1865
- Rank: Colonel
- Unit: 40th Mississippi Infantry; 1st Corps, Army of Tennessee
- Battles/wars: American Civil War

Josiah Abigail Patterson Campbell (March 2, 1830 – January 10, 1917) was an American politician and lawyer who served as the Chief Justice of the Supreme Court of Mississippi, and was previously a Speaker of the Mississippi House of Representatives and Deputy from Mississippi to the Provisional Congress of the Confederate States from 1861 to 1862.

== Biography ==
Josiah Abigail Patterson Campbell was born in Lancaster District, South Carolina, the son of a Presbyterian minister and the daughter of a wealthy plantation owner. His family was of Scottish descent.

He learned to read at four years old. He was educated at Davidson College in North Carolina, thereafter moving to Madison County, Mississippi at the age of fifteen.

He was admitted to the bar at Kosciusko, Mississippi on June 12, 1847, at the age of seventeen, making him the youngest lawyer in Mississippi, where he opened a law office and "conducted a large and profitable practice". He was elected to the state legislature in 1851 and 1859. He was the Speaker of the Mississippi House of Representatives from 1859 to 1860.

In the buildup to the American Civil War, Campbell served as a delegate to Mississippi's state secession convention in January, 1861. The convention chose him to serve as one of the state's representatives to the Provisional Congress of the Confederate States. He was a President pro tempore of the Provisional Congress for two days in 1861 and again for one day in 1862, becoming one of the original signers of the Confederate Constitution. He was defeated in his bid for election to the first regular session of Congress, so he enlisted in the Confederate States Army as captain of Company K, 40th Mississippi Infantry Regiment. Campbell was promoted to lieutenant colonel and slightly wounded at the Second Battle of Corinth. Later he was promoted to a colonel of cavalry and served as a staff officer until the end of the war.

After the war, he was elected circuit judge for the Fifth Circuit and served until 1868, when he was forced out of office for not swearing allegiance to the United States. In 1870, he was one of the commissioners who framed the code of 1871, and in 1879, he similarly worked on the code of 1880. In 1876, he became one of the chief organizers of the Mississippi Plan, which ended the era of Republican rule in Mississippi. He was appointed to a seat on the Supreme Court of Mississippi vacated by the resignation of Jonathan Tarbell in 1876, and served as Chief Justice from 1891 to 1894. He became one of the drafters of the 1890 Mississippi Constitution, which enforced legal white supremacy. In 1895, he declined re-appointment, and returned to private practice. He was succeeded on the court by Albert H. Whitfield.

Campbell was active in Confederate veterans' organizations before official formation of the United Confederate Veterans club. In 1892, for example, about eighteen months after the Mississippi Constitution of 1890 went into effect, he gave a lengthy speech at the state capitol to a group of Confederate veterans. A copy of that nearly 8,000-word speech appeared in a number of newspapers, including the Jackson Clarion, dated July 14, 1892. As Chief Justice of the Mississippi Supreme Court, he made blatantly racist statements to Confederate veterans assembled in Jackson for a reunion. He informed his audience that African Americans would forever remain as an "inferior race" and would forever be dominated by whites since it was God's plan to establish white supremacy. He characterized federal power as "coercive" and trampling upon the rights of white citizens by granting citizenship to African Americans. He also considered the federal government as interference with local control and the rights of states to freely discriminate against people.

James Meredith, the first Black student at the University of Mississippi maintained that Campbell was his great-grandfather, and Campbell was also the "father of White supremacy in Mississippi". Campbell was a supporter of legal equality of court testimony between races, but insisted throughout his career that obstacles for voting be carefully guarded so that "radical misrule" did not overtake the state's system of government.

Campbell died on January 10, 1917, aged 86, in Canton, Mississippi, and lay in state at the Mississippi Capitol Rotunda as per Governor Bilbo's request. At the time of his death, he was the last living member of the first Confederate Congress and last living signer of the Confederate Constitution. He was buried at Greenwood Cemetery.

Political offices
New constituency	Deputy from Mississippi to the Provisional Congress of the Confederate States; 1861–1862	Constituency abolished
