= Elza Jeffords =

American politician (1826–1885)

United States Representative from Mississippi's 3rd congressional district
- In office March 4, 1883 – March 3, 1885
- Preceded by: Hernando D. Money
- Succeeded by: Thomas C. Catchings

Personal details
- Born: May 23, 1826 Ironton, Lawrence County; Ohio, USA
- Died: March 19, 1885 (aged 58) Vicksburg, Warren County, Mississippi
- Resting place: Cedar Hill Cemetery near Vicksburg, Mississippi
- Party: Republican
- Children: Harry R. Jeffords
- Occupation: Lawyer

Military service
- Branch/service: United States Army: Army of the Tennessee
- Rank: Clerk of Quartermaster's Department
- Battles/wars: American Civil War

Elza Jeffords (May 23, 1826 – March 19, 1885) was a U.S. Representative from Mississippi's 3rd congressional district.

Jeffords was born near Ironton in Lawrence County, Ohio, on May 23, 1826. He grew up in Portsmouth, Ohio, where he attended public schools before apprenticing as a clerk in a law office. Jeffords read law during his apprenticeship and was admitted to the bar in 1847. After his admission to the legal profession he practiced in Portsmouth.

During the American Civil War, Jeffords served as a clerk in the Quartermaster's Department of the Army of the Tennessee from June 1862 to December 1863. Following the war he moved to Mayersville, Issaquena County, Mississippi. On February 25, 1868, General Alvan Cullem Gillem, who had been given post-Civil War command over a region including Mississippi, named Jeffords to the state supreme court, along with Thomas Shackelford and Ephraim G. Peyton. He was a delegate to the 1872 Republican National Convention, which renominated U.S. President Ulysses S. Grant.

Jeffords was elected as a Republican to the 48th United States Congress, carrying nearly 70% of the vote. He served a single term and was unsuccessful during his 1884 reelection campaign. Jeffords died on March 19, 1885, in Vicksburg, Mississippi. He was interred at Cedar Hill Cemetery near Vicksburg.

Eighty years passed before another Republican represented Mississippi in the U.S. House, Prentiss Walker of Mize in Smith County, represented the 4th district for a single term from 1965 to 1967. He forfeited the seat to make an unsuccessful race against U.S. Senator James O. Eastland.

U.S. House of Representatives
Preceded by Hernando D. Money	Member of the U.S. House of Representatives from Mississippi's 3rd congressional district 1883-1885	Succeeded by Thomas C. Catchings
