= John P. Hampton =

1st Chief justice of Mississippi Supreme court

John Preston Hampton (died January 31, 1829) was the first chief justice of the Supreme Court of Mississippi from 1818 until his death in 1829.

John Preston Hampton grew up in Columbia (now Appling), Georgia. He and his brother, Benjamin Franklin Hampton, entered Yale College as sophomores in November 1801. Both brothers graduated from Yale in 1804. Hampton then studied law and was admitted to the bar in Columbia, South Carolina, on April 22, 1807. Hampton moved to the Mississippi Territory some time prior to the organization of the State Government, and was one of the first justices of the Supreme Court of Mississippi, having taken his seat at the opening of the court, in the spring of 1818.

He was noted for his opinion in the case of Frazer v. Davis, where he held that the purchaser's failure to communicate to the seller a rumor of peace between the United States and Great Britain, calculated materially to affect the price of cotton (the commodity sold), vitiated the sale. The correctness of the decision is controverted by the reporter in a note, and the Supreme Court of the United States came to a contrary opinion in a case arising in neighboring Louisiana, Laidlaw v. Organ. Another noted decision the case of Stark's heirs vs. Mather, addressing conflicting tenures arising under different grants, one of which was made by Spain and the other by the Government of the United States. The court held that if the prior Spanish grant was a nullity for want of power on the part of the Spanish Government to effectuate it, yet, being embraced in the confirmatory provisions of the Georgia Cession, it was valid, and that consequently the subsequent patentee claiming under the United States was merely a trustee of the former grant. As a judge, Hampton "was accused of trying to enforce a standard of pure morality too lofty for practical use in the ordinary affairs of life".

Hampton died in 1829 at his home near Woodville, Mississippi, and was succeeded by Edward Turner.

== See also ==
- List of justices of the Supreme Court of Mississippi

Political offices
Preceded by Newly established court	Chief Justice of the Supreme Court of Mississippi; 1818–1829	Succeeded by Edward Turner
