= Horatio F. Simrall =

American judge

Horatio F. Simrall (February 6, 1818 – August 15, 1901) was an attorney in Kentucky and Mississippi who served as chief justice of the Mississippi Supreme Court under the 1869 constitution. Some accounts also indicate that he served as lieutenant governor of Kentucky's Confederate government.

== Early life ==
Simrall was born near Shelbyville in Shelby County, Kentucky. He attended a select school at Shelbyville and, at the age of seventeen, entered Hanover College in Indiana. He then tutored at the school at Shelbyville, and in connection with his work, studied law. In 1838 he attended the law school of Transylvania University, and later obtained his license at Frankfort. In 1839 he settled at Woodville, Mississippi, where he enjoyed a large practice. He was a member of the Mississippi Legislature from 1846 to 1848. In 1857 he accepted the chair of law in the University of Louisville and filled it until the beginning of the American Civil War.

== Russellville Convention ==
The Civil War "created a dilemma for Simrall, who was committed to the social order of the slaveholding South, but was a Unionist at heart". Some accounts indicate that Simrall was elected lieutenant governor of Kentucky's Confederate government at the Russellville Convention in 1861. He fled to his plantation in Wilkinson County, Mississippi shortly thereafter to escape Federal authorities. In 1861 he returned to Vicksburg and continued the practice of law with success. He defended many persons who were under prosecution in the court martial over which Gen. Adelbert Ames, afterwards governor of the State, was the presiding officer.

== Post-Civil War politics ==
Following the end of the Civil War, Simrall was appointed to the Mississippi Supreme Court in 1870. He was elevated to chief justice in 1876 and served until 1879. Under the constitution of 1869, judges were selected by appointment of the governor with the advice and consent of the Senate. The first bench thus constructed consisted of Chief Justice Peyton, with Simrall and Jonathan Tarbell as associate justices.

In 1870 he was appointed one of the trustees of the University of Mississippi by Governor James L. Alcorn. In 1881 that institution conferred upon him the degree of LL.D.
