= 2023 Mississippi gubernatorial election =

- November 7, 2023
- Turnout: 42.6%
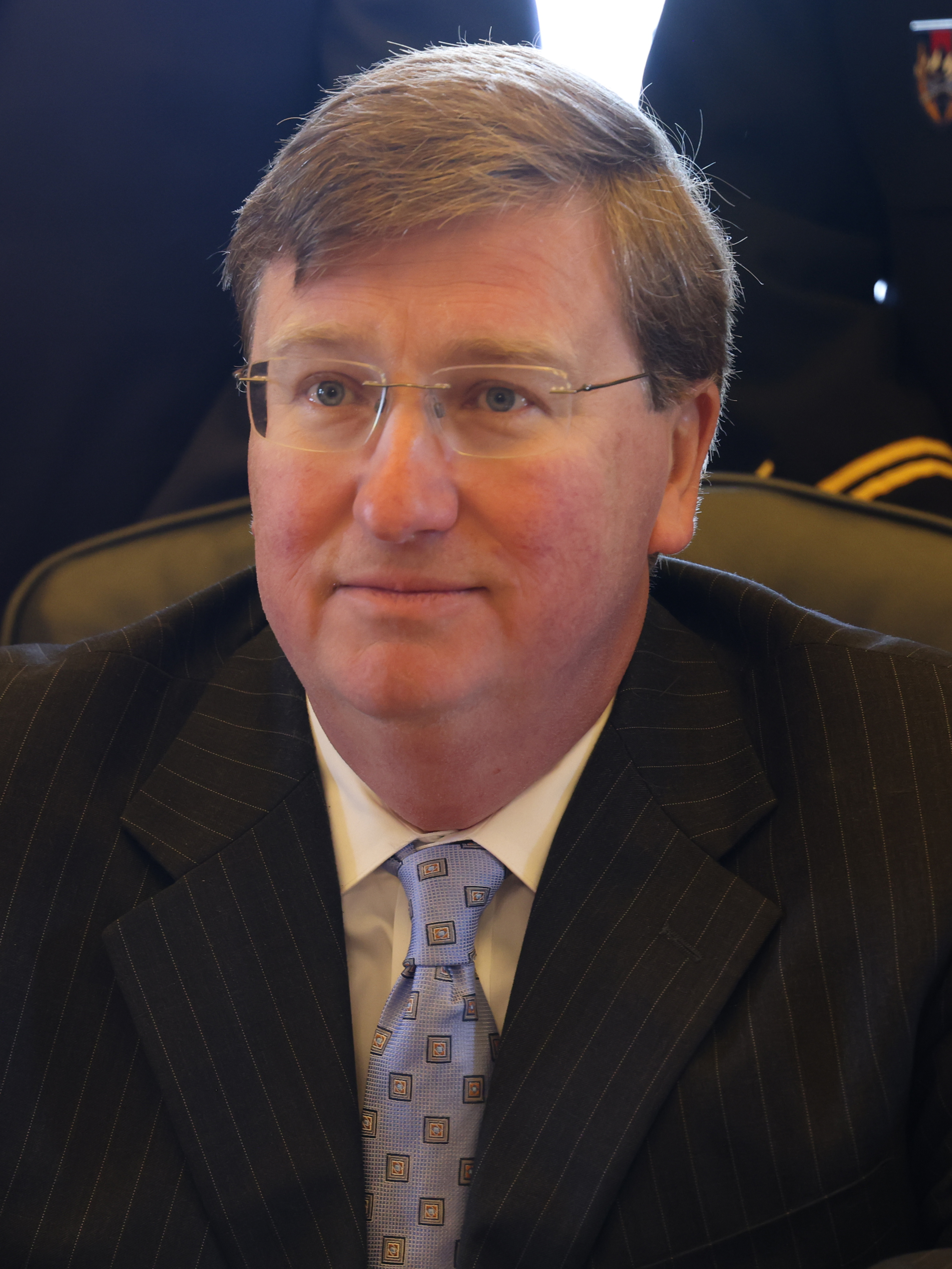

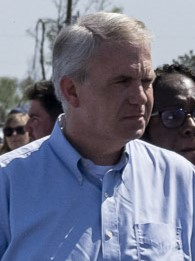
Nominee	Tate Reeves	Brandon Presley
Party	Republican	Democratic
Popular vote	418,233	391,614
Percentage	50.94%	47.70%
- Reeves: 40–50% 50–60% 60–70% 70–80% 80–90% >90% Presley: 40–50% 50–60% 60–70% 70–80% 80–90% >90% Tie: 40–50% 50% No data
Governor before election
Tate Reeves
Republican
Elected Governor
Tate Reeves
Republican

The 2023 Mississippi gubernatorial election was held on November 7, 2023, to elect the governor of Mississippi. Incumbent Republican Governor Tate Reeves won re-election to a second term, defeating Democratic nominee, Public Service Commissioner Brandon Presley. This was the sixth consecutive time that a Republican was elected governor of Mississippi.

Primary elections were held on August 8. Reeves won the Republican nomination, while Presley won the Democratic nomination unopposed.

The race was considered to be competitive, with Reeves moderately favored. Despite Reeves winning re-election, this was the worst performance for a winning Republican, the best for a losing Democrat, and the closest Mississippi gubernatorial election since 1999. It was also the closest ever gubernatorial election in the state won by a Republican, and the closest gubernatorial election in the 2023 cycle.

According to Split Ticket estimates, Reeves won 76% of White voters while Presley won 96% of Black voters in the state.

== Background ==
This was the first Mississippi gubernatorial election since a 2020 referendum altered the election process. Previously, under a provision crafted as part of the 1890 Constitution of Mississippi, a candidate needed a majority of voters across the state and a majority of voters in a majority of state House of Representatives districts; if no candidates achieved such a result, the state House of Representatives would choose between the top two finishers, something that only happened in 1999.

This structure was referred to as Mississippi's version of the electoral college; it was originally crafted, in the words of the Mississippi Historical Society, as part of "the legal basis and bulwark of the design of white supremacy". In the 21st century, because the state House districts favor Republican candidates, the provision was seen as helping Republican gubernatorial candidates as well. Under the new law, any candidate who receives a majority of statewide votes will be elected; if no candidate receives more than 50% of the vote, a statewide runoff election between the top two candidates will be held.

A socially conservative Southern state, Mississippi is considered safely Republican at the federal and state levels, with both of its U.S. senators, all but one of its U.S. representatives and all statewide executive officers currently belonging to the Republican Party. In the 2020 presidential election, Donald Trump comfortably carried Mississippi by 17 percentage points. Incumbent governor Tate Reeves was first elected in 2019, narrowly defeating then-attorney general Jim Hood, who was the only Democrat elected to hold statewide office in Mississippi at the time.

Most analysts considered Reeves to be a favorite to win reelection, given the state's partisan lean and incumbency advantage. Nonetheless, the race was considered to be unusually competitive throughout the Fall as polling showed the race within the margin of error. Weaknesses for Reeves included his narrow victory four years prior, the heavy criticism he has faced for his handling of the Jackson water crisis, and for his ties to a welfare corruption scandal, both of which led him to have the lowest approval ratings of any Republican governor in the country. The Democratic nominee, Brandon Presley, was considered to be a strong general election candidate; he represented the Northern district on the Mississippi Public Service Commission since 2008, despite that district having a strong Republican bend, and held relatively moderate views on social issues, thus being closer to fitting the state.

Mississippi has the highest rate of disenfranchisement in the United States and around 16% of the African American voting age population is disenfranchised.

== Republican primary ==
=== Candidates ===
==== Nominee ====
- Tate Reeves, incumbent governor

==== Eliminated in primary ====
- David Grady Hardigree, U.S. Army veteran
- John Witcher, physician

==== Declined ====
- Lynn Fitch, Mississippi attorney general (ran for re-election)
- Robert Foster, former state representative and candidate for governor in 2019 (ran for the DeSoto County Board of Supervisors)
- Andy Gipson, Mississippi commissioner of agriculture and commerce (ran for re-election)
- Philip Gunn, speaker of the Mississippi House of Representatives
- Bill Waller Jr., former chief justice of the Mississippi Supreme Court, son of former governor Bill Waller, and candidate for governor in 2019
- Michael Watson, Mississippi secretary of state (ran for re-election)
- Shad White, Mississippi state auditor (ran for re-election)

=== Polling ===
Poll source	Date(s) administered	Sample size (Note: Key: A – all adults RV – registered voters LV – likely voters V – unclear)	Margin of error	David Hardigree	Tate Reeves	John Witcher	Other	Undecided
Mississippi Today/Siena College	Jun 4–7, 2023	646 (RV)	± 4.8%	0%	59%	0%	8% (Note: "Someone else" with 8%)	33%
American Strategies (Note: This poll was sponsored by the National Apartment Association and the National Association of Realtors. The poll was never officially released, and was instead leaked by the Magnolia Tribune in June 2023.)	May 22–24, 2023	646 (LV)	± 3.9%	2%	70%	4%	-	24%

Hypothetical polling

Tate Reeves vs. Bill Waller Jr.

Poll source	Date(s) administered	Sample size	Margin of error	Tate Reeves	Bill Waller Jr.	Undecided
Mississippi Today/Siena College	January 3–8, 2023	821 (RV)	± 4.6%	52%	29%	19%

=== Results ===
Results by county: Reeves: >90%; 80–90%; 70–80%; 60–70%

Republican primary results
Party	Candidate	Votes	%
Republican	Tate Reeves (incumbent)	281,213	74.7
Republican	John Witcher	66,698	17.7
Republican	David Grady Hardigree	28,561	7.6
Total votes		376,472	100.0

== Democratic primary ==
=== Candidates ===
==== Nominee ====
- Brandon Presley, Mississippi Public Service commissioner for the Northern District

==== Disqualified ====
- Bob Hickingbottom, political consultant and Constitution nominee for governor in 2019
- Gregory Wash, songwriter and candidate for governor in 2019

==== Declined ====
- Shuwaski Young, political organizer and nominee for Mississippi's 3rd congressional district in 2022 (ran for secretary of state)

=== Fundraising ===
Campaign finance reports as of June 9, 2023
Candidate	Raised	Spent	Cash on hand
Brandon Presley	$1,760,057	$773,134	$1,714,455

=== Results ===
Democratic primary results
Party	Candidate	Votes	%
Democratic	Brandon Presley	196,307	100.0
Total votes		196,307	100.0

== Independents ==
=== Candidates ===
==== Withdrawn ====
- Gwendolyn Gray, nonprofit executive (endorsed Presley, remained on ballot)

==== Declined ====
- George Flaggs Jr., mayor of Vicksburg and former Democratic state representative
- Bill Waller Jr., (Note: Waller is a Republican, but media sources speculated that he might run as an independent.) former chief justice of the Mississippi Supreme Court, son of former Governor Bill Waller, and candidate for governor in 2019

== General election ==
=== Predictions ===
Source	Ranking	As of
The Cook Political Report	Lean R	October 23, 2023
Inside Elections	Lean R	September 1, 2023
Sabato's Crystal Ball	Likely R	October 16, 2023
Elections Daily	Likely R	November 7, 2023

=== Debate ===
Dates	Location	Presley	Reeves	Link
November 1, 2023	WAPT Studios; Jackson	Participant	Participant	YouTube

=== Endorsements ===
Tate Reeves (R)

Executive branch officials

- Donald Trump, 45th president of the United States (2017–2021)

State senators

- Charles Younger, state senator from the 17th district (2014–present)

State representatives

- Angela Cockerham, state representative from the 96th district (2006–present) (Independent)

Local officials

- George Bass, mayor of Long Beach (2017–present)
- Nancy Depreo, mayor of Diamondhead (2020–present)
- Mike Favre, mayor of Bay St. Louis (2017–present)
- James Rafferty, mayor of Pass Christian (2021–present)
- Jay Trapani, mayor of Waveland (2023–present)

Organizations

- Gulf Coast Business Council
- Mississippi Associated General Contractors
- Mississippi Association of Realtors
- National Federation of Independent Business
- National Rifle Association of America Political Victory Fund
- Susan B. Anthony Pro-Life America
Brandon Presley (D)

Executive branch officials

- Robert Martinez Jr., President's Export councillor (2023–present) and international president of the International Association of Machinists and Aerospace Workers (2016–present)

U.S. representatives

- Michael Parker, former U.S. representative from Mississippi's 4th congressional district (1989–1999) and Republican nominee for governor in 1999 (Republican)
- Bennie Thompson, U.S. representative from Mississippi's 2nd congressional district (1993–present)

Statewide officials

- John Bel Edwards, governor of Louisiana (2016–2024)
- Dick Molpus, former secretary of state of Mississippi (1984–1996) and Democratic nominee for governor in 1995
- Phil Murphy, governor of New Jersey (2018–2026)
- Gavin Newsom, governor of California (2019–present)

State senators

- Kelvin Butler, state senator from the 38th district (2021–present)
- Robert Jackson, state senator from the 11th district (2004–present)
- Derrick Simmons, Mississippi Senate minority leader (2017–present) from the 12th district (2011–present)

State representatives

- Otis Anthony, state representative from the 31st district (2018–present)
- Bryant Clark, state representative from the 47th district (2004–present)
- John Faulkner, state representative from the 5th district (2014–present)
- John Grisham, state representative from the 7th district (1983–1990)
- Timaka James-Jones, state representative-elect from the 51st district (2023–present)
- Daryl Porter Jr., state representative from the 98th district (2020–present)
- Robert Sanders, state representative from the 29th district (2021–present)

Local officials

- Phillip Baulch, mayor of Nettleton (2022–present)
- Hosea Bogan, Monroe County supervisor
- Jackie Bradford, Scott County supervisor
- Leah Brown, mayor of Sturgis (2021–present)
- James Dunn, Tunica County supervisor
- Debra Mabry, Holmes County supervisor
- Fred Magee, Holmes County supervisor
- Reggie Moore, Leflore County supervisor
- Buddy Palmer, councilman for Ward 5 of Tupelo (Republican)
- Johnny Thomas, mayor of Glendora (1982–present)
- Orlando Trainer, Oktibbeha County supervisor
- Chip Wood, alderman for Ward 3 of Corinth (Republican)
- Roderick Woullard, Forrest County supervisor

Individuals

- James Barksdale, executive
- Morgan Freeman, actor
- Gwendolyn Gray, nonprofit executive and former 2023 gubernatorial candidate (Independent)
- Margaret Huang, human rights and racial justice advocate
- Karla Jurvetson, vice chair of EMILY's List
- Richard Scruggs, former lawyer and brother-in-law of former Republican U.S. Senator Trent Lott

Labor unions

- Central South Regional Council of Carpenters
- International Brotherhood of Electrical Workers
- Mississippi AFL-CIO
- Mississippi Education Association
- Mississippi Hospital Association
- Mississippi State Council of Machinists

Newspapers and other media

- The Commercial Dispatch
- The Daily Mississippian
- The Greenwood Commonwealth
- Northeast Mississippi News

Organizations

- Democrats for Life of America
- Southern Poverty Law Center Action Fund

=== Polling ===
Aggregate polls

Source of poll aggregation	Dates administered	Dates updated	Tate Reeves (R)	Brandon Presley (D)	Other (Note: Calculated by taking the difference of 100% and all other candidates combined.)	Margin
RealClearPolitics	August 20 – October 2, 2023	October 5, 2022	51.5%	42.0%	6.5%	Reeves +9.5%

Poll source	Date(s) administered	Sample size	Margin of error	Tate Reeves (R)	Brandon Presley (D)	Other	Undecided
Public Policy Polling (D) (Note: This poll was sponsored by the Democratic Governors Association)	October 19–20, 2023	601 (V)	± 4.0%	46%	45%	–	10%
Magnolia Tribune/Mason-Dixon	September 27 – October 2, 2023	625 (LV)	± 4.0%	51%	43%	–	6%
Mississippi Today/Siena College	August 20–28, 2023	650 (LV)	± 4.0%	52%	41%	1% (Note: "Someone else" with 1%)	6%
Impact Research (D) (Note: This poll was sponsored by Presley's campaign)	August 6–9, 2023	600 (LV)	± 4.0%	46%	46%	–	8%
OnMessage Inc. (R) (Note: This poll was sponsored by Reeves' campaign)	July 7, 2023	–	–	49%	32%	–	19%
Impact Research (D)	April 24–27, 2023	600 (LV)	± 4.0%	47%	44%	–	9%
Mississippi Today/Siena College	April 16–20, 2023	783 (RV)	± 4.3%	49%	38%	7% (Note: "Not going to vote" with 6%; "Someone else" with 1%)	6%
Magnolia Tribune/Mason-Dixon	March 6–10, 2023	625 (LV)	± 4.0%	46%	39%	–	15%
Mississippi Today/Tulchin Research (Note: This poll was sponsored by the Southern Poverty Law Center)	January 21–25, 2023	500 (RV)	± 4.4%	43%	47%	–	10%
Mississippi Today/Siena College	January 3–8, 2023	821 (RV)	± 4.6%	43%	39%	2% (Note: "Some other candidate" with 2%)	14%
Impact Research (D)	December 2022	600 (LV)	± 4.0%	49%	42%	–	9%

Hypothetical polling

Tate Reeves vs. generic opponent

Poll source	Date(s) administered	Sample size	Margin of error	Tate Reeves (R)	Generic opponent	Undecided
Mississippi Today/Siena College	April 16–20, 2023	783 (RV)	± 4.3%	36%	60%	4%
Mississippi Today/Siena College	January 3–8, 2023	821 (RV)	± 4.6%	33%	57%	10%

=== Results ===
2023 Mississippi gubernatorial election
Party	Candidate	Votes	%	±%
Republican	Tate Reeves (incumbent)	418,233	50.94%	–0.97%
Democratic	Brandon Presley	391,614	47.70%	+0.87%
Independent	Gwendolyn Gray (withdrawn)	11,153	1.36%	N/A
Total votes		821,000	100.00%	N/A
Republican hold				

==== By county ====
County	Tate Reeves Republican		Brandon Presley Democratic		Gwendolyn Gray Independent		Margin		Total
County	#	%	#	%	#	%	#	%	Total
Adams	3,516	37.29%	5,782	61.33%	130	1.38%	-2,266	-24.03%	9,428
Alcorn	6,138	72.48%	2,205	26.04%	125	1.48%	3,933	46.45%	8,468
Amite	2,946	57.97%	2,025	39.85%	111	2.18%	921	18.12%	5,082
Attala	2,984	50.41%	2,858	48.28%	78	1.32%	126	2.13%	5,920
Benton	1,632	56.55%	1,187	41.13%	67	2.32%	445	15.42%	2,886
Bolivar	2,405	28.68%	5,886	70.19%	95	1.13%	-3,481	-41.51%	8,386
Calhoun	2,836	62.56%	1,631	35.98%	66	1.46%	1,205	26.58%	4,533
Carroll	2,235	58.45%	1,539	40.25%	50	1.31%	696	18.20%	3,824
Chickasaw	2,404	42.55%	3,184	56.35%	62	1.10%	-780	-13.81%	5,650
Choctaw	1,786	63.29%	981	34.76%	55	1.95%	805	28.53%	2,822
Claiborne	380	12.25%	2,672	86.17%	49	1.58%	-2,292	-73.91%	3,101
Clarke	3,575	60.05%	2,266	38.06%	112	1.88%	1,309	21.99%	5,953
Clay	2,509	35.21%	4,547	63.81%	70	0.98%	-2,038	-28.60%	7,126
Coahoma	1,196	22.71%	3,994	75.85%	76	1.44%	-2,798	-53.13%	5,266
Copiah	4,010	42.93%	5,205	55.72%	126	1.35%	-1,195	-12.79%	9,341
Covington	3,541	56.14%	2,658	42.14%	108	1.71%	883	14.00%	6,307
DeSoto	21,378	57.75%	15,171	40.99%	466	1.26%	6,207	16.77%	37,015
Forrest	8,999	48.95%	9,134	49.68%	251	1.37%	-135	-0.73%	18,384
Franklin	1,884	58.53%	1,270	39.45%	65	2.02%	614	19.07%	3,219
George	3,884	82.50%	737	15.65%	87	1.85%	3,147	66.84%	4,708
Greene	2,472	71.32%	869	25.07%	125	3.61%	1,603	46.25%	3,466
Grenada	3,649	45.57%	4,241	52.96%	118	1.47%	-592	-7.39%	8,008
Hancock	7,503	71.07%	2,896	27.43%	158	1.50%	4,607	43.64%	10,557
Harrison	24,216	56.19%	18,301	42.46%	582	1.35%	5,915	13.72%	43,099
Hinds	13,634	19.99%	54,006	79.19%	562	0.82%	-40,372	-59.19%	68,202
Holmes	834	14.33%	4,918	84.53%	66	1.13%	-4,084	-70.20%	5,818
Humphreys	691	22.18%	2,382	76.47%	42	1.35%	-1,691	-54.29%	3,115
Issaquena	192	44.76%	229	53.38%	8	1.86%	-37	-8.62%	429
Itawamba	5,170	74.91%	1,631	23.63%	101	1.46%	3,539	51.27%	6,902
Jackson	17,685	61.97%	10,446	36.60%	407	1.43%	7,239	25.37%	28,538
Jasper	2,538	42.41%	3,334	55.72%	112	1.87%	-796	-13.30%	5,984
Jefferson	296	10.91%	2,385	87.91%	32	1.18%	-2,089	-77.00%	2,713
Jefferson Davis	1,474	34.38%	2,762	64.41%	52	1.21%	-1,288	-30.04%	4,288
Jones	13,333	65.03%	6,718	32.76%	453	2.21%	6,615	32.26%	20,504
Kemper	1,316	35.02%	2,393	63.68%	49	1.30%	-1,077	-28.66%	3,758
Lafayette	7,671	51.45%	7,044	47.24%	195	1.31%	627	4.21%	14,910
Lamar	11,456	68.24%	5,079	30.25%	254	1.51%	6,377	37.98%	16,789
Lauderdale	10,066	55.47%	7,847	43.24%	235	1.29%	2,219	12.23%	18,148
Lawrence	2,504	56.06%	1,897	42.47%	66	1.48%	607	13.59%	4,467
Leake	3,563	54.21%	2,905	44.20%	104	1.58%	658	10.01%	6,572
Lee	13,024	55.68%	10,186	43.55%	180	0.77%	2,838	12.13%	23,390
Leflore	1,442	20.00%	5,695	78.98%	74	1.03%	-4,253	-58.98%	7,211
Lincoln	7,109	62.64%	4,067	35.84%	173	1.52%	3,042	26.80%	11,349
Lowndes	8,127	45.86%	9,382	52.95%	211	1.19%	-1,255	-7.08%	17,720
Madison	19,704	50.69%	18,909	48.65%	255	0.66%	795	2.05%	38,868
Marion	4,471	60.40%	2,825	38.17%	106	1.43%	1,646	22.24%	7,402
Marshall	4,384	47.86%	4,608	50.30%	169	1.84%	-224	-2.45%	9,161
Monroe	6,022	53.09%	5,246	46.24%	76	0.67%	776	6.84%	11,344
Montgomery	1,614	49.63%	1,597	49.11%	41	1.26%	17	0.52%	3,252
Neshoba	4,644	67.61%	2,122	30.89%	103	1.50%	2,522	36.72%	6,869
Newton	4,015	63.50%	2,202	34.83%	106	1.68%	1,813	28.67%	6,323
Noxubee	662	18.21%	2,951	81.16%	23	0.63%	-2,289	-62.95%	3,636
Oktibbeha	5,400	42.42%	7,192	56.50%	138	1.08%	-1,792	-14.08%	12,730
Panola	5,443	47.17%	5,850	50.69%	247	2.14%	-407	-3.53%	11,540
Pearl River	8,445	76.27%	2,400	21.67%	228	2.06%	6,045	54.59%	11,073
Perry	2,598	67.96%	1,138	29.77%	87	2.28%	1,460	38.19%	3,823
Pike	5,123	43.26%	6,500	54.89%	219	1.85%	-1,377	-11.63%	11,842
Pontotoc	6,420	70.82%	2,517	27.77%	128	1.41%	3,903	43.06%	9,065
Prentiss	4,082	65.90%	2,023	32.66%	89	1.44%	2,059	33.24%	6,194
Quitman	642	27.31%	1,651	70.23%	58	2.47%	-1,009	-42.92%	2,351
Rankin	29,025	65.69%	14,784	33.46%	377	0.85%	14,239	32.23%	44,186
Scott	4,018	50.81%	3,750	47.42%	140	1.77%	268	3.39%	7,908
Sharkey	366	23.25%	1,186	75.35%	22	1.40%	-820	-52.10%	1,574
Simpson	4,385	57.60%	3,138	41.22%	90	1.18%	1,247	16.38%	7,613
Smith	3,393	68.59%	1,476	29.84%	78	1.58%	1,917	38.75%	4,947
Stone	3,629	69.22%	1,505	28.70%	109	2.08%	2,124	40.51%	5,243
Sunflower	1,490	24.70%	4,443	73.64%	100	1.66%	-2,953	-48.95%	6,033
Tallahatchie	1,368	34.01%	2,595	64.52%	59	1.47%	-1,227	-30.51%	4,022
Tate	5,284	60.92%	3,193	36.82%	196	2.26%	2,091	24.11%	8,673
Tippah	3,970	69.91%	1,647	29.00%	62	1.09%	2,323	40.91%	5,679
Tishomingo	4,174	73.00%	1,416	24.76%	128	2.24%	2,758	48.23%	5,718
Tunica	496	23.56%	1,556	73.92%	53	2.52%	-1,060	-50.36%	2,105
Union	5,481	72.63%	1,993	26.41%	72	0.95%	3,488	46.22%	7,546
Walthall	2,713	53.01%	2,319	45.31%	86	1.68%	394	7.70%	5,118
Warren	6,079	45.12%	7,190	53.37%	204	1.51%	-1,111	-8.25%	13,473
Washington	2,475	23.89%	7,782	75.11%	104	1.00%	-5,307	-51.22%	10,361
Wayne	4,244	56.25%	3,118	41.33%	183	2.43%	1,126	14.92%	7,545
Webster	2,480	71.84%	936	27.11%	36	1.04%	1,544	44.73%	3,452
Wilkinson	955	31.25%	1,989	65.09%	112	3.66%	-1,034	-33.84%	3,056
Winston	3,130	48.71%	3,215	50.03%	81	1.26%	-85	-1.32%	6,426
Yalobusha	2,130	48.65%	2,173	49.63%	75	1.71%	-43	-0.98%	4,378
Yazoo	3,076	43.23%	3,934	55.29%	105	1.48%	-858	-12.06%	7,115
Totals	418,233	50.94%	391,614	47.70%	11,153	1.36%	26,619	3.24%	821,000

==== Counties that flipped from Republican to Democratic ====
- Forrest (largest city: Hattiesburg)
- Grenada (largest city: Grenada)
- Lowndes (largest city: Columbus)
- Winston (largest city: Louisville)
- Yalobusha (largest city: Water Valley)

==== Counties that flipped from Democratic to Republican ====
- Lafayette (largest city: Oxford)
- Madison (largest city: Madison)

==== By congressional district ====
Reeves won three of four congressional districts.

District	Reeves	Presley	Representative
1st	58.0%	40.7%	Trent Kelly
2nd	31.4%	67.3%	Bennie Thompson
3rd	55.7%	43.1%	Michael Guest
4th	62.3%	36.0%	Mike Ezell

== See also ==
- 2023 Mississippi elections

== Notes ==
Partisan clients
