= Cannabis in Mississippi =

Cannabis in Mississippi is legal for medical use and illegal for non-medical use. Possession of small amounts was decriminalized in 1978.

== Enforcement ==
While possession of small amounts is indeed decriminalized, it is still a misdemeanor and only decriminalized in the sense that one will not be jailed for a first offense. Under the Mississippi Code of 1979, possession of less than 30 grams (1.1 oz) of marijuana is a misdemeanor, with the first offense punishable by jail time up to 90 days and a $250 fine. However, probation is always given in lieu of a jail sentence following the 1978 decriminalization. One will likely be brought to jail when charged, but, at the discretion of the arresting officer, this can be avoided by both having acceptable identification and promising to appear in court to answer the charge. Subsequent offenses require a minimum 5 days in jail and graduating scale of fines. Possession of paraphernalia will result in up to 90 days in jail and a fine of up to $1,000.00. Again, probation is given instead of the jail sentence, and since 1978 there has never been a person sentenced to jail time for possession of paraphernalia in Mississippi. Simultaneous possession of under 30 grams and paraphernalia is punishable only with a possession of marijuana charge. In practice, if found with under 30 grams of marijuana, it is common to receive a paraphernalia charge for the container it was in, instead of a possession charge. This is done to save the state from having to pay testing costs for the marijuana.

Possession of between one and 30 grams kept in a vehicle is punishable of a fine up to $1,000 and up to 90 days in jail. This only applies to areas in the vehicle occupied by passengers and does not apply to a trunk. Additionally, any conviction will result in a 6-month suspension of driving privileges.

Possession of larger amounts are felonies, as is sale, cultivation and trafficking. For example, the sale of over 10 pounds of marijuana carries a life sentence without the possibility of parole. However, the penalty can be reduced if the person charged provides information on their supplier or other relevant persons to state authorities. Penalties for possession of hash and concentrates is more severe than for marijuana, with any amount greater than 0.1 grams a felony with mandatory sentencing on a graduating scale. First time possession of up to .1 grams can be punished as either a misdemeanor or a felony, at the discretion of the presiding judge. Possession of more than .1 gram but less than 2 grams carries a mandatory 2 years in jail. Trafficking any amount of hash or concentrates carries a mandatory 30 years in the state penitentiary.

== 2014 legalization of CBD ==
House Bill 1231 was introduced by Representative Sam C. Mims (R) and referred to Judiciary Committee on January 2, 2014. It passed in the House by a vote of 119–0 on February 6, 2014, and was transmitted to the Senate on February 7, 2014, which then passed and was amended by a vote of 52–0 on March 6, 2014. The House and the Senate signed HB 1231 on March 30, 2014, which was Sent to Governor Bryant on April 1, 2014.

In April 2014, Governor Phil Bryant signed into law HB1231, "Harper Grace's Act", following a house vote of 112-6 and Senate vote of 49–0. The Daily Chronic criticized the measure, noting that while it authorizes three research centers to produce high-CBD extracts, there is no assured means for patients to obtain the extracts.

This law allows "processed cannabis plant extract, oil or resin that contains more than fifteen percent (15%) cannabidiol (CBD) or a dilution of the resin that contains at least fifty (50) milligrams of cannabidiol per milliliter, but not more than one-half of one percent (.5%) of tetrahydrocannabinol [THC]. CBD oil may only be obtained by the order of a physician who is licensed to practice in Mississippi. Administering CBD oil to a patient must be done by or under the direction or direct supervision of a physician. The CBD oil must be obtained from or tested by the National Center for Natural Products Research at the University of Mississippi and dispensed by the Department of Pharmacy Services at the University of Mississippi Medical Center."

"Harper Grace's Law" would create more restrictive rules that exist in any of the states that currently have legal medical marijuana. House Bill 1231 only allows processed cannabis plant extract, oil or resin that contains more than 15% of cannabidiol (CBD) and no more than 0.5% THC.

== Medical use (2020) ==
On January 8, 2020, a citizen-initiated measure to legalize medical marijuana in the state qualified for the November ballot as Initiative 65. Two months later, on March 12, 2020, the state legislature voted to place a competing measure, initiative 65A, on the same ballot. Both measure 65 and measure 65A called for legalizing medical marijuana but differed in the specifics, with the citizen-initiative measure 65 seen as creating a more detailed framework for legalization than the legislatively-referred measure 65A. On the ballot, voters were asked two separate questions: The first question asked them to choose between rejecting both of the measures and approving either of the measures, and the second question asked them to choose between measure 65 and 65A. In order for a measure to pass, the "either" option would need to get more votes than the "neither" option on the first question, the measure would need to receive the majority of the votes on the second question, and the measure would need to receive over 40% of the total votes cast. Mississippians for Compassionate Care, the group behind Initiative 65, accused the state legislature of intentionally trying to confuse voters by placing a second measure on the ballot.

On November 3, 2020, voters voted to approve Initiative 65, effectively legalizing medical marijuana in the state. The initiative was overturned by the Supreme Court of Mississippi in a 6–3 majority decision released on May 14, 2021. The decision cited a fundamental flaw in the state's ballot initiative process that makes it impossible for any citizen-initiated measure to qualify for the ballot.

== Medical use (2022) ==
Senate Bill 2095, the Mississippi Medical Cannabis Act, was a follow-up to the 2020 initiative and largely followed its provisions except for reducing the monthly purchase limit from five ounces to four. It was introduced in the Senate on January 11; passed that chamber on January 16, and by the state House with amendments on January 19. The bill went to a bicameral committee for reconciliation and was passed by the Senate 46–4 and by the House 103–13 in a final vote on January 26. The bill was signed into law by state governor, Tate Reeves, on February 2, 2022. On January 25, 2023, the first legal sale of medical cannabis was made by Debbie McDermott at The Cannabis Company in Brookhaven, Mississippi. In 2022, the state of Mississippi received a total of 2311 applications for medical marijuana cards. Of those applications, 1321 were approved. 242 new cannabis businesses have opened since 2022. These businesses range from cultivation facilities to dispensaries, and they provide patients with access to medical marijuana products. For patients, registering with the state costs anywhere from $50 to $100 annually.

Patients who suffer from a qualifying condition may qualify for medical marijuana in Mississippi.
