= Tate Reeves =

Governor of Mississippi since 2020

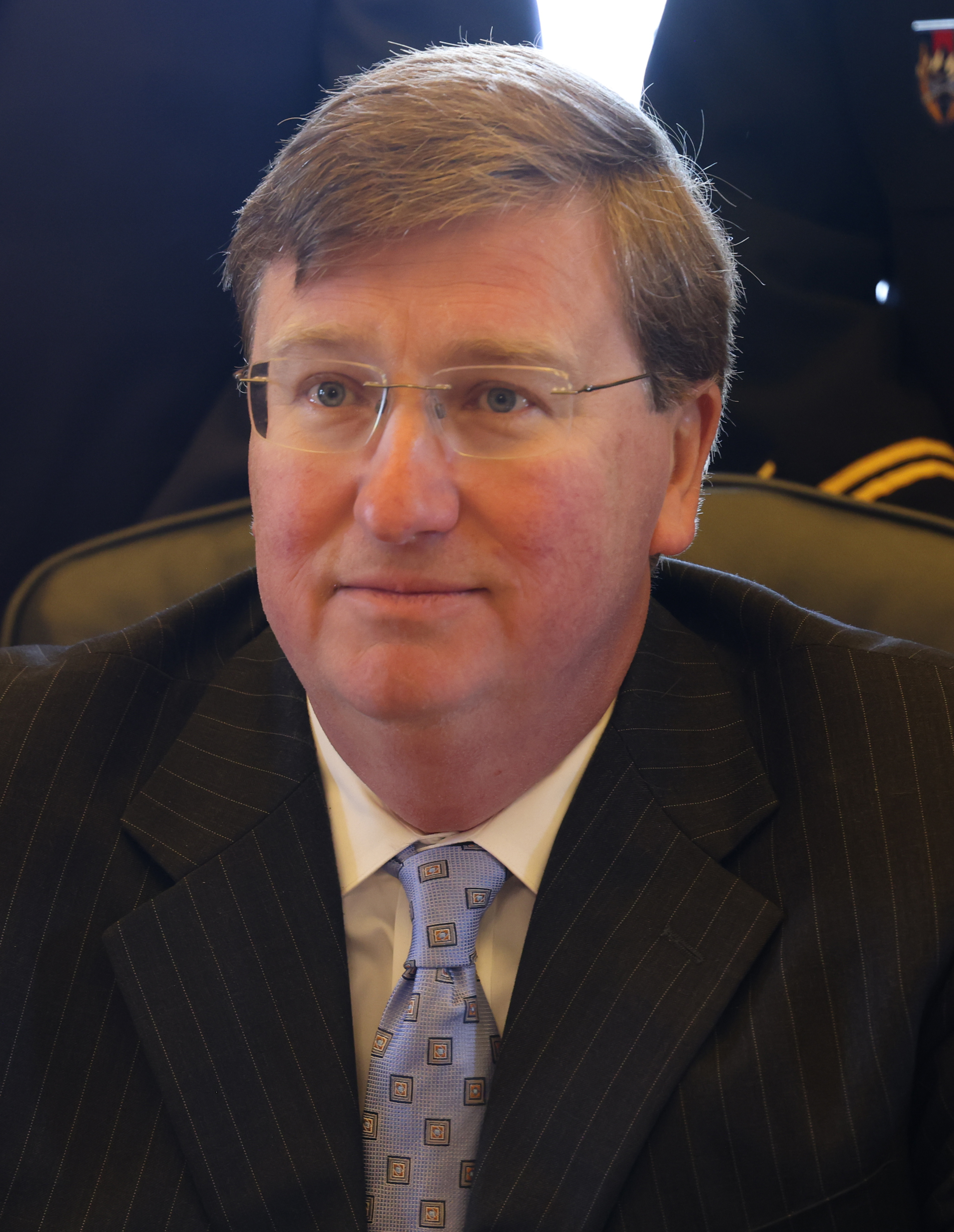
- Reeves in 2022

65th Governor of Mississippi
- Incumbent
- Assumed office January 14, 2020
- Lieutenant: Delbert Hosemann
- Preceded by: Phil Bryant

32nd Lieutenant Governor of Mississippi
- In office January 10, 2012 – January 14, 2020
- Governor: Phil Bryant
- Preceded by: Phil Bryant
- Succeeded by: Delbert Hosemann

53rd Treasurer of Mississippi
- In office January 13, 2004 – January 10, 2012
- Governor: Haley Barbour
- Preceded by: Peyton Prospere
- Succeeded by: Lynn Fitch

Personal details
- Born: Jonathan Tate Reeves; June 5, 1974 (age 52) Florence, Mississippi, U.S.
- Party: Republican
- Spouse: Elee Williams (m. 2001)
- Children: 3
- Education: Millsaps College (BA)
- Website: Office website Campaign website
- Tate Reeves's voice Tate Reeves on the response to the 2023 Rolling Fork–Silver City tornado. Recorded March 31, 2023

Jonathan Tate Reeves (born June 5, 1974) is an American politician serving since 2020 as the 65th governor of Mississippi. A member of the Republican Party, Reeves served as the 32nd lieutenant governor of Mississippi from 2012 to 2020 and as the 53rd treasurer of Mississippi from 2004 to 2012.

Born in Florence, Mississippi, Reeves graduated from Florence High School in 1992 and Millsaps College in 1996. After receiving his degree in economics, he became a Chartered Financial Analyst. He began work at Park South Corporation, leaving in 2000 to become a financial portfolio manager at Trustmark.

Reeves entered the race for Mississippi state treasurer after Democratic incumbent Marshall G. Bennett announced he would not run. In the Republican primary runoff, he defeated former Central District Transportation Commissioner Wayne Burkes. In the general election, he defeated Democratic nominee Gary Anderson. He was reelected in 2007 and went on to become lieutenant governor in 2012, holding the position until his inauguration as governor.

Reeves was chosen as his party's nominee in the 2019 Mississippi gubernatorial election, defeating former state Supreme Court Justice Bill Waller Jr. and State Representative Robert Foster. In the general election, he narrowly defeated Attorney General Jim Hood. During his tenure, Reeves signed legislation to change the state flag, removed COVID-19 restrictions earlier than many of his fellow governors, and opposed vaccine requirements and medical cannabis. He was narrowly reelected in 2023, defeating Brandon Presley.

== Early life and education ==
Tate Reeves was born on June 5, 1974. A native of Rankin County, Mississippi, he is the eldest son of Terry Reeves and Dianne Peeples. Reeves's father founded a heating and air conditioning company in 1975 that became a multi-million-dollar business. Reeves graduated from Florence High School in Florence and from Millsaps College in Jackson with a degree in economics. He played college basketball for two years before injuring his shoulder.

At Millsaps College, Reeves was a member of the Kappa Alpha Order, a fraternity that has faced accusations of racism. In 2019, yearbook photos surfaced showing members in blackface and Confederate uniforms, but it is unclear whether Reeves was involved.

== Early career ==
After graduating from college in 1996, Reeves became a Chartered Financial Analyst. He worked at Park South Corporation, a subsidiary of the Deposit Guaranty National Bank, which eventually merged into AmSouth. In 2000, Reeves moved to Trustmark National Bank, where he was a financial portfolio manager until 2003, when he resigned to run for state treasurer.

== Mississippi state treasurer (2004–2012) ==
Reeves sought the post of Mississippi state treasurer in the 2003 election. It was an open seat, as Democratic incumbent Marshall G. Bennett was retiring. In the 2003 Republican primary election, Reeves faced former Central District Transportation Commissioner Wayne Burkes of Brandon and State Representative Andrew Ketchings of Natchez. In the Republican primary, Reeves led with 49% of the vote, with Burkes in second place. Because no candidate won a majority, Reeves and Burkes had a runoff election; Reeves defeated Burkes in the runoff, which had low turnout.

In the general election, Reeves defeated Democratic nominee Gary Anderson, the state director of finance and administration, 52% to 46%. Anderson had substantially more experience than Reeves, but Reeves's campaign raised and spent substantially more money. Observers also cited racial prejudice (Anderson is African American) as a possible factor in Anderson's loss. Reeves's father contributed $115,000 to his campaign, about one-fifth of its fundraising total.

Reeves's election made him the first Republican to hold the position of Mississippi state treasurer, and the youngest official elected statewide in the modern history of the state, at 29 years old.

In 2007, Reeves won reelection with about 60% of the vote, defeating Democratic candidate Shawn O'Hara.

== Lieutenant governor of Mississippi (2012–2020) ==
In February 2011, Reeves entered the race for lieutenant governor. In the August Republican primary, he defeated Mississippi State Senate president pro tempore Billy Hewes of Gulfport, 162,857 votes to 123,389. In the November general election, he was elected lieutenant governor, succeeding Phil Bryant, who was elected to his first term as governor. Reeves ran without Democratic opposition; he received 80.35% of the vote; Reform Party candidate Tracella Lou O'Hara Hill received 19.65%.

As lieutenant governor, Reeves was president of the state Senate, and used his position to prevent Medicaid expansion from receiving a floor vote and to block an increase in the gas tax to fund repairs to roads and to Mississippi's many structurally deficient bridges.

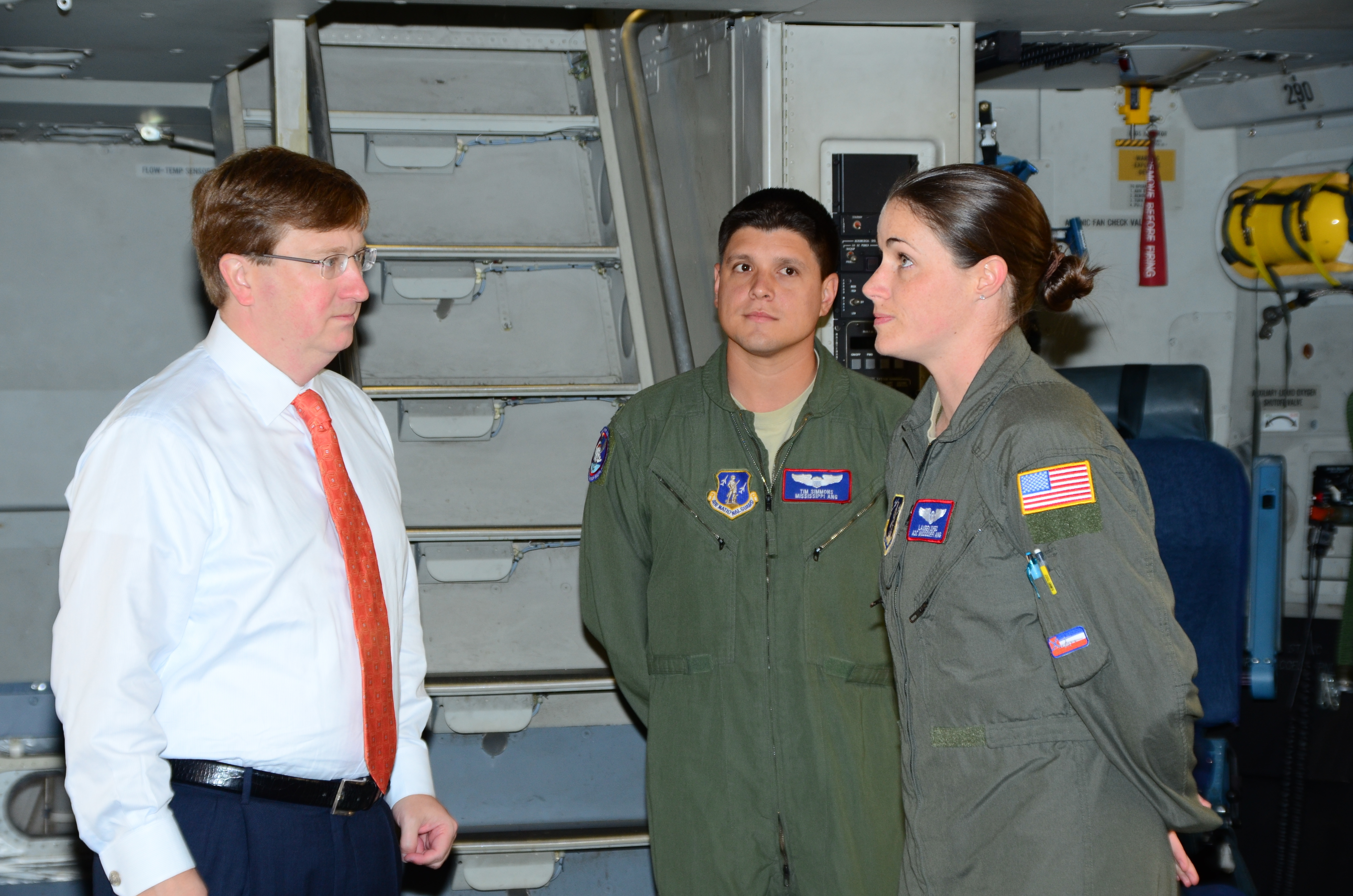
Reeves visiting the 172nd Airlift Wing in 2015

Reeves won reelection as lieutenant governor on November 3, 2015, defeating three opponents, including state Senator Timothy L. Johnson, a Republican-turned-Democrat.

== Governor of Mississippi (2020–present) ==
=== Elections ===
==== 2019 election ====
Reeves ran for governor of Mississippi in the 2019 election. He was the favorite to win the nomination. He enjoyed substantial name recognition from his 16 years in statewide office, and had a significant fundraising advantage over his rivals, former state Supreme Court Justice Bill Waller Jr. and Robert Foster, a first-term member of the state House.

During the primary race, three former state Republican party chairs endorsed Waller (who was seen as more pragmatic), while outgoing governor Phil Bryant, former governor Haley Barbour, and Chris McDaniel endorsed Reeves (who was seen as more conservative). Reeves strongly opposed Medicaid expansion under the Affordable Care Act, which he disparaged as the "Obamacare expansion." This position contrasted with that of Waller and Foster, who supported a version of Medicaid expansion to benefit Mississippi's rural hospitals, almost half of which were close to bankruptcy before the COVID-19 pandemic. Reeves also opposed increasing the gas tax to fund road and bridge repairs, while Waller supported it. Reeves said "radical liberals" were attacking "Mississippi's culture and Mississippi's values".

In the primary, Reeves and Waller finished in first and second place, respectively. Because no candidate won a majority of the vote, Reeves and Waller proceeded to a runoff election. Reeves won the nomination in the runoff by about 28,000 votes. Waller defeated Reeves in 17 counties, including Reeves's home county, Rankin, with Reeves losing his home precinct by 20 percentage points.

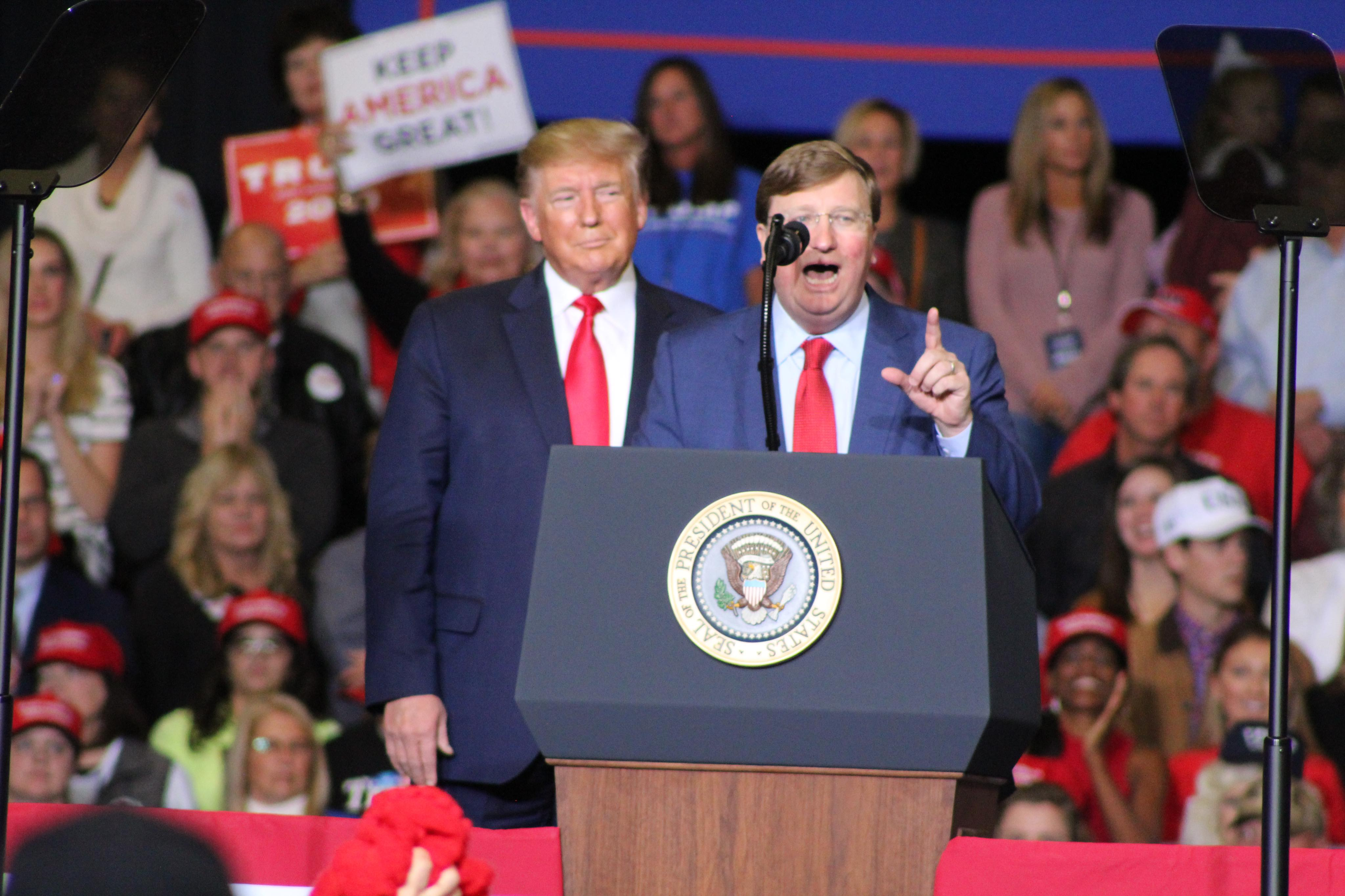
Reeves at a 2019 Trump rally in Tupelo

During his 2019 campaign for governor, Reeves touted the support of Donald Trump, who carried the state in 2016 and 2020. Reeves promised, "If I'm elected governor, I will work for President Trump." Trump, his vice president Mike Pence, and his son Donald Trump Jr. all campaigned for Reeves in Mississippi in 2019. At a rally in Tupelo days before the 2019 election, the elder Trump promoted Reeves's candidacy while assailing the impeachment inquiry against him over the Trump–Ukraine scandal.

Reeves defeated the Democratic nominee, state Attorney General Jim Hood, in the November general election. Republicans won all eight statewide offices in 2019, a first in Mississippi history. The election was Mississippi's first competitive election for governor since 2003. Reeves received 459,396 votes to Hood's 414,368. He took office on January 14, 2020.

==== 2023 election ====
On November 7, 2023, Reeves defeated the Democratic nominee, Brandon Presley, in the 2023 Mississippi gubernatorial election, winning reelection to a second term. Presley conceded to Reeves after unofficial results showed him losing.

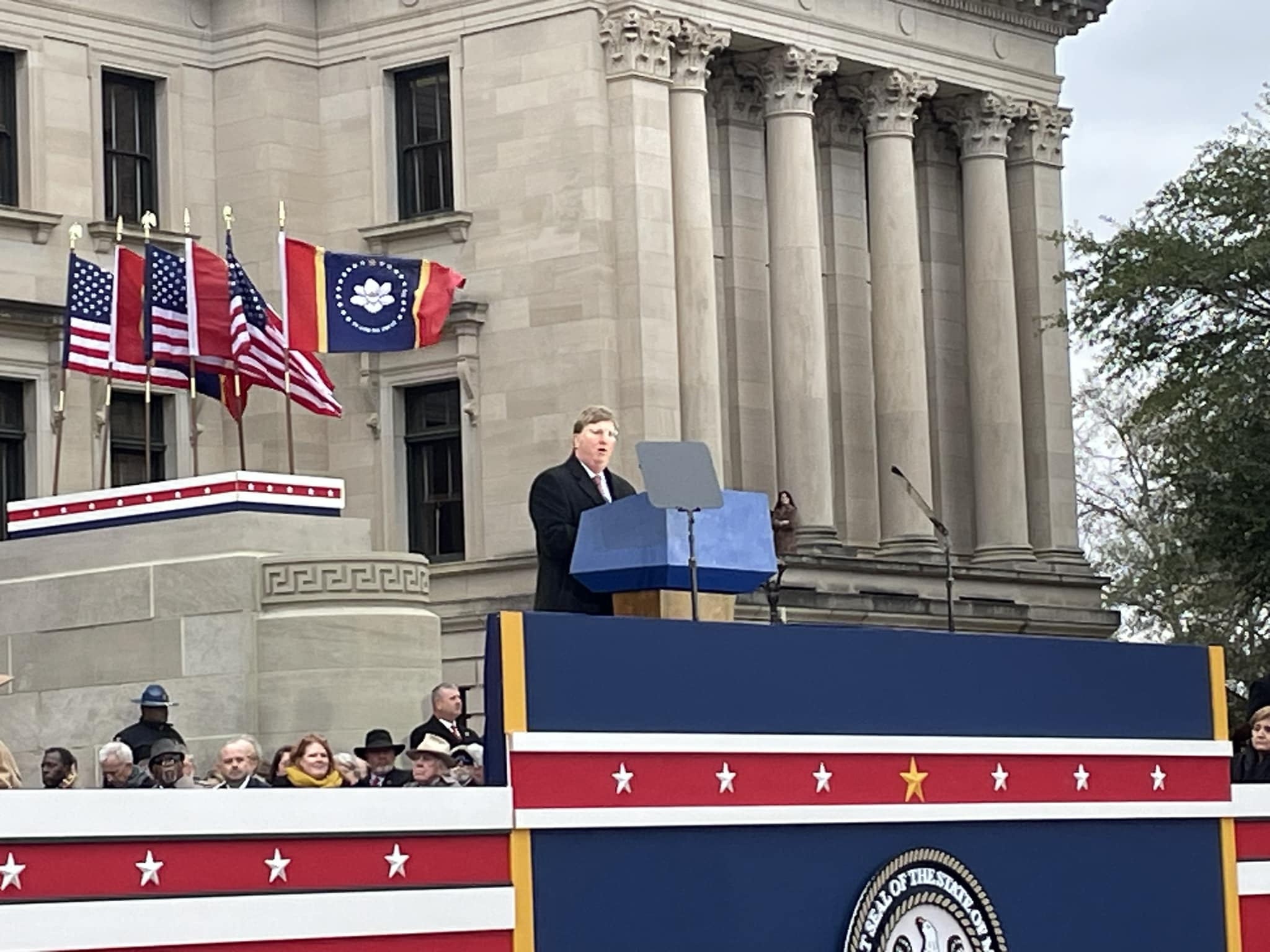
Governor Tate Reeves gives a speech at his 2024 inauguration.

=== Confederate iconography ===
In June 2020, amid the George Floyd protests, debate arose about whether to change the flag of Mississippi, which featured a Confederate insignia. Reeves initially said that the flag should be changed only by voter-approved referendum, but later reversed himself, saying that if the Mississippi legislature passed a bill to retire the flag without a referendum, he would sign it. On June 28, 2020, the legislature voted to change the flag, 91 to 23 in the House and 37 to 14 in the Senate.

=== COVID-19 ===
Amid the acceleration of the COVID-19 pandemic Reeves closed schools, declared a state of emergency, and told people to trust in the "power of prayer", but did little to combat COVID-19 transmission. In March 2020, Reeves issued an order deeming most public places to be "essential services." His order prompted substantial criticism, largely because it clashed with previously issued local orders and caused confusion as to whether the order overrode local leaders' decisions to order the closures of businesses and other public places. Leaders of many of Mississippi's largest cities and counties criticized Reeves's order. The mayor of Tupelo said that Reeves had engaged in an "abdication of leadership". Days later, Reeves issued an amended order, clarifying that his previous order was not intended to interfere with local governments' decisions.

Reeves implemented a "stay-at-home" order in April 2020, but allowed some retail businesses to reopen shortly thereafter. In early May 2020, Mississippi had its largest spike of coronavirus deaths and cases up to that point. It had another sharp uptick in COVID-19 cases and deaths in November 2020. In December 2020, although Reeves urged the public to avoid large gatherings to prevent the further spread of the virus, his office invited legislators and other officials to at least three holiday parties at the Governor's Mansion.

Except for August 4 through September 30, 2020, Reeves did not issue a statewide mask mandate in the state, setting only county-by-county mandates in locations with rapid increases in infections. Of the state's 82 counties, 16 were under a mask mandate in November 2020, when the mandates expired. Effective April 30, 2021, Reeves ended COVID-19 restrictions (with the exception of the school mask mandate) through May 31, 2021. For the 2021–2022 school year, he did not reinstate the mask mandate. At a political rally in July 2021, he called the Centers for Disease Control and Prevention's recommendations on indoor face coverings "foolish" and "harmful".

When a COVID-19 vaccine was made widely available, Reeves opposed vaccine requirements. Mississippi had one of the lowest vaccination rates among U.S. states, a fact Reeves downplayed. After President Joe Biden used his authority under the federal Occupational Safety and Health Act to require federal workers to be vaccinated against COVID-19 and to require all employers with more than 100 workers to require employees to be vaccinated against COVID-19 or receive weekly testing, Reeves called the mandate "tyranny" and an "attack on hardworking Americans." Biden responded by calling Reeves's remark "the worst kind of politics", referencing the 660,000 COVID-19 deaths in the U.S. up to that point and noting that "in Mississippi, children are required to be vaccinated against measles, mumps, rubella, chickenpox, hepatitis B, polio, tetanus and more." Reeves joined a Republican-led lawsuit against Biden's plan.

In August 2021, Reeves argued that Mississippi Christians were "less scared" because "when you believe in eternal life—when you believe that living on this earth is but a blip on the screen, then you don't have to be so scared of things."

During COVID-19, Mississippi suffered a shortage of hospital workers (in particular nurses). Reeves declined to call a special session of the legislature to allocate the state's $1.8 billion share of federal COVID-19 relief funds to address the crisis.

=== Criminal justice and prisons ===
In 2020, Reeves vetoed two criminal justice bills that would have expanded parole eligibility for Mississippi prisoners; one would have allowed nonviolent offenders to be considered for parole after serving 25% of their sentence, while the other would allow those convicted of violent crimes to be eligible for parole consideration after completing 50% of their sentence or 20 years, whichever comes first. In 2021, Reeves signed into law a narrower bill that expanded parole eligibility. He rejected calls to grant a pardon or commutation to Tameka Drummer, a Mississippi inmate serving a life without parole sentence for the possession of less than two ounces of marijuana; Drummer was sentenced in 2008 under the state's habitual-offender law.

As governor, Reeves faced significant problems with the state's prison system, especially Mississippi State Penitentiary at Parchman—including widespread, deadly violence and unsanitary, dangerous conditions. After nine prisoner deaths in one month at Parchman, Reeves acknowledged that Parchman's conditions were "terrible"; he ordered the closure of part of the complex, along with other reforms. Several hundred inmates were moved from Parchman's infamous "Unit 29" to the privately operated Tallahatchie County Correctional Facility.

=== Medical cannabis ===
In 2020, Mississippi voters approved (by 70%) a medical marijuana initiative; the state supreme court subsequently invalidated the initiative, holding that it was improperly placed on the ballot. Reeves opposed the initiative, but said he would honor "the will of the voters" who had overwhelmingly voted in favor of medical marijuana. On February 2, 2022, he signed the bill into law, making Mississippi the 37th state to legalize medical cannabis.

=== Taxation and budget ===
As governor, Reeves pushed legislation to eliminate the state income tax. The rating agency Fitch raised concerns in November 2021 that his taxation plans were fiscally unfeasible.

=== Labor unions ===
In 2024, Reeves joined five other Republican governors (Kay Ivey, Brian Kemp, Henry McMaster, Bill Lee, and Greg Abbott) in a statement opposing the United Auto Workers unionization campaign.

=== Welfare funds scandal ===
Reeves drew controversy for firing the attorney leading the state's welfare agency lawsuit. His friend Paul Lacoste, a former football player who had become a well-known fitness trainer in Mississippi, was found to have secured a $1.4 million contract for a boot camp fitness program through state welfare funds. NFL legend Brett Favre also lobbied Reeves for the construction of a volleyball stadium at the university his daughter attended, which was funded by state welfare money.

== Political positions ==
=== Contraception ===
In May 2022, Reeves repeatedly refused to deny that he would ban contraception in Mississippi when questioned by journalist Jake Tapper. He later said that Mississippi would not attempt to restrict contraception. All methods of contraception remain legal in Mississippi as of 2025.

=== Early voting ===
In November 2020, amid the COVID-19 pandemic, Reeves said he would veto any bill that expanded mail-in voting or no-excuse early voting. Mississippi has some of the most restrictive laws in the U.S. for pre-Election Day voting.

=== Education ===
Reeves used his 2020 budget proposal to appeal to the conservative base. Echoing Trump, he proposed allocating $3 million to a "Patriotic Education Fund", saying, "across the country, young children have suffered from indoctrination in far-left socialist teachings". Reeves's budget proposal recommended bonuses for schoolteachers in high-performing or improving schools, but largely ignored his 2019 campaign pledge to boost teacher pay in each year of his term. He proposed teacher raises in the 2022 budget.

=== Race ===
In April 2021, Reeves said, "There is not systemic racism in America." Earlier that month, he had declared April "Confederate Heritage Month" in Mississippi. In March 2022, Reeves declared April "Confederate Heritage Month". He has done this every year of his term.

=== 2020 presidential election ===
After Joe Biden defeated Trump in the 2020 election, and Trump refused to concede, Reeves supported Trump-backed lawsuits to throw out the election results in several states Biden won, where Trump and his allies made false claims of fraud. In March 2021, Reeves acknowledged that Biden was the president and was "duly elected" but repeatedly refused to acknowledge that Biden was "legitimately and lawfully elected" or that the 2020 election was free and fair.

== Personal life ==
Reeves is married to Elee Reeves (née Williams); they have three children. Reeves and his family attend Galloway Memorial United Methodist Church.

== Electoral history ==
2003 Mississippi Treasurer Republican primary
Party	Candidate	Votes	%
Republican	Tate Reeves	80,770	48.48
Republican	Wayne Burkes	51,745	31.06
Republican	Andrew Ketchings	33,795	20.28
Republican	Write-ins	311	0.19
Total votes		166,621	100.00

2003 Mississippi Treasurer Republican primary runoff
Party	Candidate	Votes	%
Republican	Tate Reeves	49,466	72.16
Republican	Wayne Burkes	19,047	27.78
Republican	Write-ins	39	0.06
Total votes		68,552	100.00

2003 Mississippi Treasurer election
Party	Candidate	Votes	%
Republican	Tate Reeves	447,860	51.80
Democratic	Gary Anderson	403,307	46.64
Reform	Lee Dilworth	13,507	1.56
Total votes		864,674	100.00
Republican gain from Democratic			

2007 Mississippi Treasurer election
Party	Candidate	Votes	%
Republican	Tate Reeves (incumbent)	436,833	60.53
Democratic	Shawn O'Hara	284,789	39.47
Total votes		721,622	100.00
Republican hold			

2011 Mississippi lieutenant gubernatorial Republican primary
Party	Candidate	Votes	%
Republican	Tate Reeves	162,857	56.89
Republican	Billy Hewes	123,389	43.11
Total votes		286,246	100.00

2011 Mississippi lieutenant gubernatorial election
Party	Candidate	Votes	%
Republican	Tate Reeves	644,205	80.35
Reform	Tracella Lou O'Hara	157,547	19.65
Total votes		801,752	100.00
Republican hold			

2015 Mississippi lieutenant gubernatorial Republican primary
Party	Candidate	Votes	%
Republican	Tate Reeves (incumbent)	225,192	82.50
Republican	Alisha Nelson McElhenney	47,760	17.50
Total votes		272,952	100.00

2015 Mississippi lieutenant gubernatorial election
Party	Candidate	Votes	%
Republican	Tate Reeves (incumbent)	429,990	60.45
Democratic	Timothy L. Johnson	255,657	35.94
Libertarian	Ron Williams	16,226	2.28
Reform	Rosa Williams	9,410	1.32
Total votes		711,283	100.00
Republican hold			

2019 Mississippi gubernatorial Republican primary
Party	Candidate	Votes	%
Republican	Tate Reeves	182,979	48.91
Republican	Bill Waller Jr.	124,707	33.33
Republican	Robert Foster	66,441	17.76
Total votes		374,127	100.00

2019 Mississippi gubernatorial Republican primary runoff
Party	Candidate	Votes	%
Republican	Tate Reeves	176,251	54.28
Republican	Bill Waller Jr.	148,471	45.72
Total votes		324,722	100.00

2019 Mississippi gubernatorial election
Party	Candidate	Votes	%
Republican	Tate Reeves	459,396	51.91
Democratic	Jim Hood	414,368	46.83
Independent	David Singletary	8,522	0.96
Constitution	Bob Hickingbottom	2,625	0.30
Total votes		884,911	100.00
Republican hold			

2023 Mississippi gubernatorial election
Party	Candidate	Votes	%
Republican	Tate Reeves (incumbent)	418,233	50.94
Democratic	Brandon Presley	391,614	47.70
Independent	Gwendolyn Gray	11,153	1.36
Total votes		821,000	100.00
Republican hold			

Party political offices
Vacant Title last held by J. Walter Michel; 1995	Republican nominee for Treasurer of Mississippi; 2003, 2007	Succeeded by Lynn Fitch
Preceded by Phil Bryant	Republican nominee for Lieutenant Governor of Mississippi; 2011, 2015	Succeeded by Delbert Hosemann
Preceded by Phil Bryant	Republican nominee for Governor of Mississippi; 2019, 2023	Most recent
Political offices
Preceded by Peyton Prospere	Treasurer of Mississippi; 2004–2012	Succeeded by Lynn Fitch
Preceded by Phil Bryant	Lieutenant Governor of Mississippi; 2012–2020	Succeeded by Delbert Hosemann
Preceded by Phil Bryant	Governor of Mississippi; 2020–present	Incumbent
U.S. order of precedence (ceremonial)
Preceded by JD Vance as Vice President	Order of precedence of the United States; Within Mississippi	Succeeded by Mayor of city in which event is held
Preceded by JD Vance as Vice President	Order of precedence of the United States; Within Mississippi	Succeeded by Otherwise Mike Johnson as Speaker of the House
Preceded by Mike Braun as Governor of Indiana	Order of precedence of the United States; Outside Mississippi	Succeeded by J. B. Pritzker as Governor of Illinois
