= TRMK =

TRMK may refer to:

- Trustmark, NASDAQ code of Trustmark Corporation
- TRNA (adenine22-N1)-methyltransferase, an enzyme
