= E. Grady Jolly =

American judge (1937–2026)

Grady Jolly

Senior Judge of the United States Court of Appeals for the Fifth Circuit
- In office October 3, 2017 – March 16, 2026

Judge of the United States Court of Appeals for the Fifth Circuit
- In office July 30, 1982 – October 3, 2017
- Appointed by: Ronald Reagan
- Preceded by: James P. Coleman
- Succeeded by: Cory T. Wilson

Personal details
- Born: Elbert Grady Jolly Jr. October 3, 1937 Louisville, Mississippi, U.S.
- Died: March 16, 2026 (aged 88) Jackson, Mississippi, U.S.
- Education: University of Mississippi (BA, LLB)

Elbert Grady Jolly Jr. (October 3, 1937 – March 16, 2026) was an American jurist who served as a United States circuit judge of the United States Court of Appeals for the Fifth Circuit. His chambers were in Jackson, Mississippi.

== Education and career ==
Jolly was born in Louisville, Mississippi. He received a Bachelor of Arts degree from the University of Mississippi in 1959 and a Bachelor of Laws from the University of Mississippi Law School in 1962. He was a trial attorney for the National Labor Relations Board in Winston-Salem, North Carolina from 1962 to 1964, an Assistant United States Attorney for the Northern District of Mississippi from 1964 to 1967, and a lawyer for the Tax Division of the United States Department of Justice from 1967 to 1969. In 1969, he entered private practice in Jackson, Mississippi.

== Federal judicial service ==
Jolly was nominated by President Ronald Reagan on July 1, 1982, to the United States Court of Appeals for the Fifth Circuit, to the seat vacated by Judge James P. Coleman. He was confirmed by the United States Senate on July 27, 1982, and received commission on July 30, 1982. Jolly assumed senior status on October 3, 2017. Jolly took inactive senior status in October 2025.

=== Notable cases ===
In July 1986, Jolly wrote the opinion for a unanimous three-judge panel that held Louisiana's law requiring schools to teach creationism alongside evolution was an unconstitutional violation of the Establishment Clause. The decision was affirmed by the Supreme Court in Edwards v. Aguillard.

In July 2014, Jolly wrote the 2–1 majority opinion in Jackson Women's Health Organization v. Currier, which allowed Mississippi's sole abortion clinic to remain open. Jolly stated that a state law which would have shut down the clinic because its doctors were unable to obtain privileges at a local hospital would have violated Mississippi women's rights to seek abortions within their state's borders.

== Death ==
Jolly died on March 16, 2026, at the age of 88.

Legal offices
Preceded by James P. Coleman	Judge of the United States Court of Appeals for the Fifth Circuit; 1982–2017	Succeeded by Cory T. Wilson
