= James Ellington (politician) =

American politician (born 1943)

- Ellington in 2007

Member of the Mississippi House of Representatives from the 73rd district
- In office 1988–2012
- Succeeded by: Brad Oberhousen

Personal details
- Born: December 5, 1943 (age 82)
- Party: Republican

James Ellington (born December 5, 1943) is an American Republican politician. From 1988 to 2012 he served as member of the Mississippi House of Representatives from the 73rd District.
