= Tommy Taylor (Mississippi politician) =

American politician

Member of the Mississippi House of Representatives from the 28th district
- In office January 3, 2012 – January 5, 2016
- Preceded by: David Norquist
- Succeeded by: Robert Foster

Personal details
- Born: August 2, 1948 (age 78) Cleveland, Mississippi, U.S.
- Party: Republican
- Spouse: Robbie Steed
- Education: Delta State University (BS)

Military service
- Allegiance: United States
- Branch/service: United States Army
- Rank: Specialist 5
- Battles/wars: Vietnam War
- Awards: Purple Heart

Thomas G. Taylor (born August 2, 1948) is an American politician. He was a member of the Mississippi House of Representatives from the 28th District, first elected in 2011. He is a member of the Republican party.
