= 2019 Mississippi gubernatorial election =

- November 5, 2019
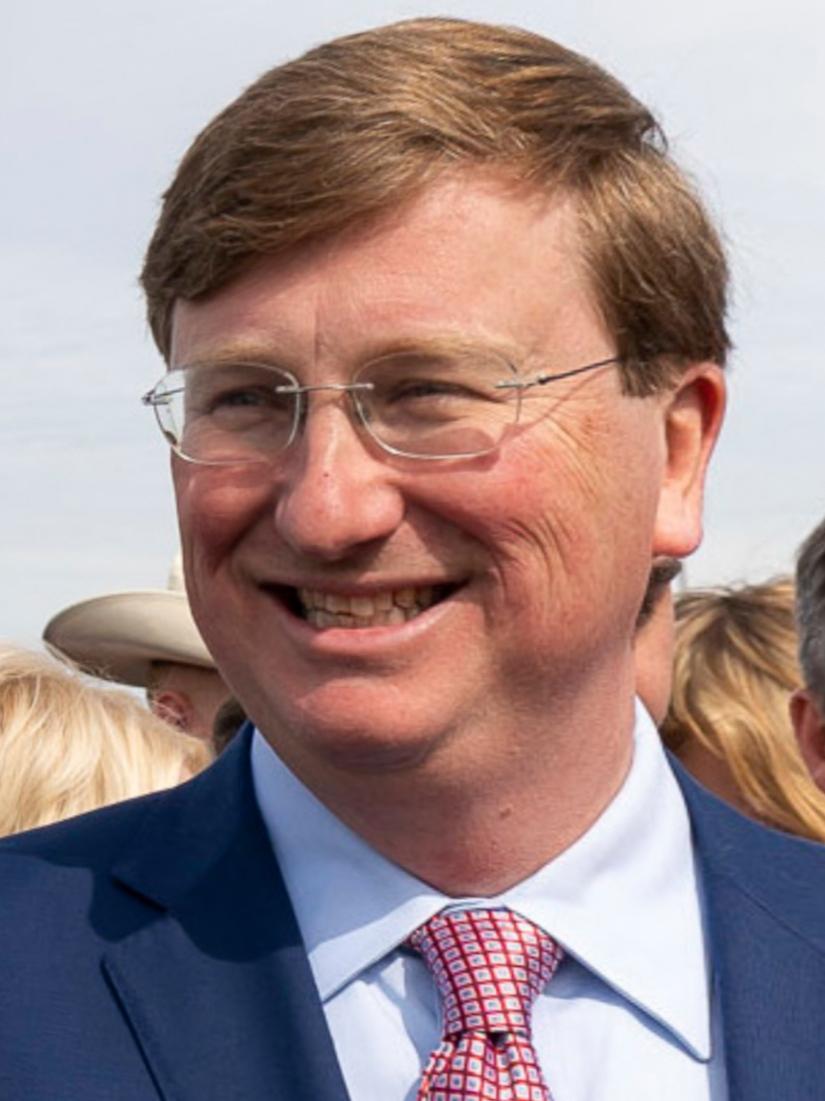

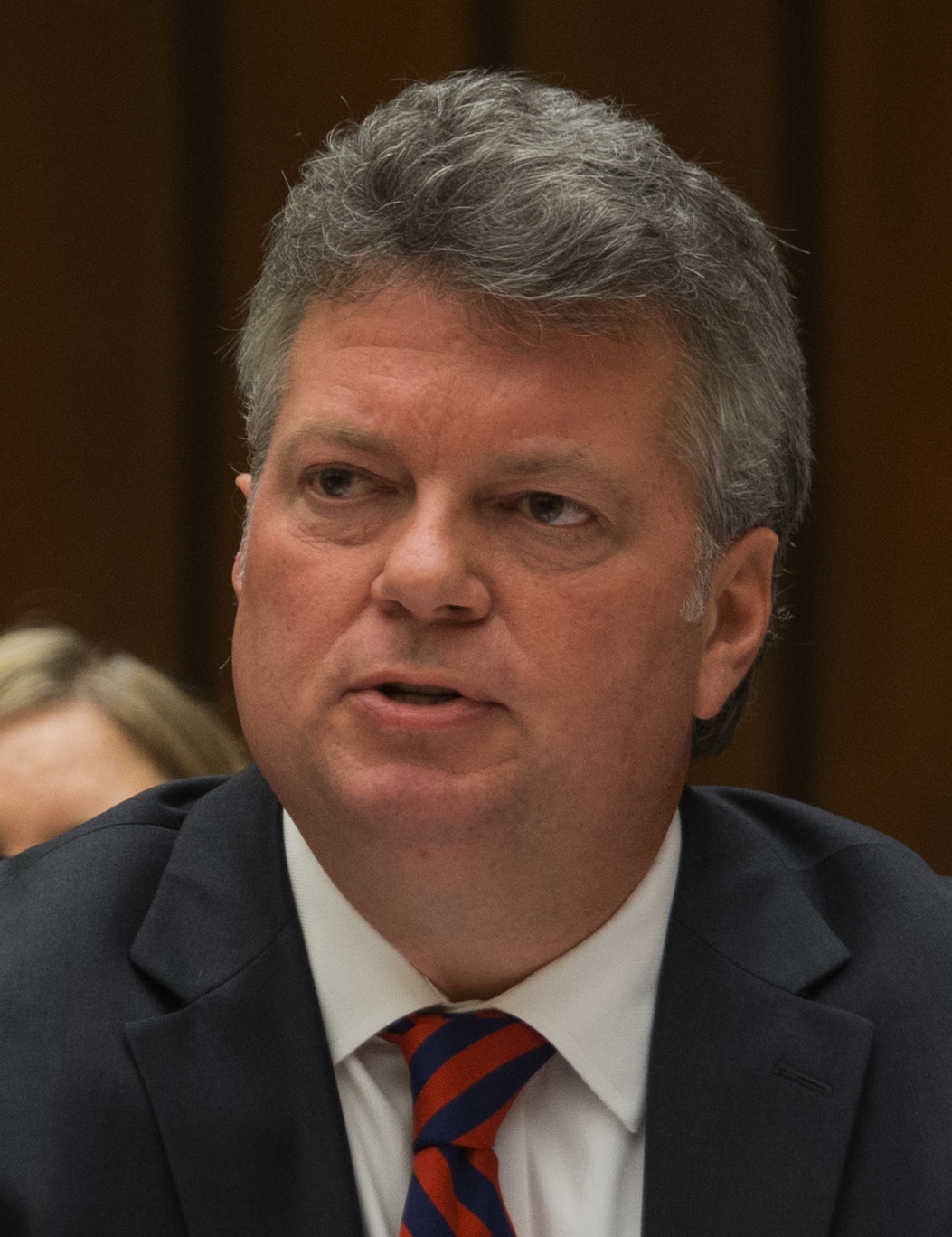
Nominee	Tate Reeves	Jim Hood
Party	Republican	Democratic
Electoral vote	73	49
Popular vote	459,396	414,368
Percentage	51.91%	46.83%
- Reeves: 40–50% 50–60% 60–70% 70–80% 80–90% >90% Hood: 40–50% 50–60% 60–70% 70–80% 80–90% >90%
Governor before election
Phil Bryant
Republican
Elected Governor
Tate Reeves
Republican

The 2019 Mississippi gubernatorial election took place on November 5, 2019, to choose the next governor of Mississippi. Incumbent Governor Phil Bryant was ineligible to run for a third term due to term limits. The Democratic Party nominated incumbent Attorney General Jim Hood, the only Democrat holding statewide office in Mississippi; the Republican Party nominated incumbent Lieutenant Governor Tate Reeves. In the general election, Reeves defeated Hood by a margin of 5.08%, with Reeves significantly underperforming Donald Trump, who won the state by 18 points in 2016. This was the last gubernatorial election to be held under the state's electoral college system, which was abolished by a 2020 referendum.

== Background ==
Situated in the Deep South as a socially conservative Bible Belt state, Mississippi is one of the most Republican states in the country. No Democrat has been elected to the governorship since Ronnie Musgrove in 1999. However, the state's Democratic Attorney General, Jim Hood, who had held his office since 2004 and had yet to lose a statewide election, put the Republicans' winning streak of four elections in a row to the test, as the race became unusually competitive. Reeves defeated Hood in the general election by a margin of 5.1%, making this the closest a Democrat had come to winning a Mississippi gubernatorial election since 1999. Hood pulled off the best performance by a Democrat since the 2003 Mississippi gubernatorial election, when fellow Democrat Ronnie Musgrove took 45.81% of the vote. Hood flipped the counties of Chickasaw, Lafayette, Madison, Panola, and Warren, which had all voted for Republican Donald Trump in the 2016 United States presidential election.

Uniquely among the states, the Constitution of Mississippi at the time established a sort of electoral college at the state level. For the election of governor. Article 5, Section 140 of the state constitution stated that each state House district was to be assigned an electoral vote, and that a candidate running for governor must receive a majority of electoral votes (essentially, they must win a majority of state House districts) in addition to winning a majority of the popular vote in order to be elected governor. Article 5, Section 141 of the state constitution stated that if no candidate won both a popular and electoral vote majority, the state House of Representatives would decide the winner, choosing from the two highest popular vote winners. This provision came into play only one time in the state's history; Democratic candidate Ronnie Musgrove in the 1999 gubernatorial election garnered a plurality, but not a majority; the House selected Musgrove.

In the lead-up to the election, controversy emerged over these constitutional provisions establishing a state system of electoral votes, with a federal lawsuit claiming the provisions were racially biased. These provisions were put in place with the 1890 Mississippi Constitution, itself established by the segregationist Redeemers and overturning the Reconstruction-era 1868 Constitution, as part of Jim Crow Era policy to minimize the power of African Americans in politics. Because of this, as well as gerrymandering that packed African Americans into a small number of districts, the plaintiffs claied the provisions should be struck down on the basis of racial bias.

On November 3, 2020, an amendment was passed removing the electoral college, with 79% of the vote.

== Republican primary ==
=== Candidates ===
==== Nominee ====
- Tate Reeves, lieutenant governor of Mississippi

==== Eliminated in runoff ====
- Bill Waller Jr., former chief justice of the Mississippi State Supreme Court and son of former Democratic Governor William "Bill" Waller. Sr (1972–1976)

==== Eliminated in primary ====
- Robert Foster, Mississippi state representative

==== Withdrawn ====
- Hal Marx, mayor of Petal (endorsed Tate Reeves)

==== Declined ====
- Thomas Duff, businessman
- Lynn Fitch, Mississippi state treasurer (running for Mississippi attorney general)
- Gerard Gibert, businessman and lottery board member
- Philip Gunn, speaker of the Mississippi House of Representatives
- Trent Lott, former U.S. senator
- Chris McDaniel, Mississippi states senator and candidate for the U.S. Senate in 2014 and 2018 (endorsed Tate Reeves)
- Mike Randolph, presiding justice of the Mississippi State Supreme Court
- Andy Taggart, former chief of staff to Governor Kirk Fordice (running for Mississippi attorney general)

=== Endorsements ===
Tate Reeves

U.S. Presidents

- Donald Trump, 45th president of the United States

U.S. Representatives

- Steven Palazzo (MS-04)

State-wide officials

- Haley Barbour, former governor of Mississippi
- Sam Britton, public service commissioner (Southern District)
- Phil Bryant, governor of Mississippi
- Pete Ricketts, governor of Nebraska

State legislators

- Chris McDaniel, Mississippi State Senator

Mayors

- Fofo Gilich, Biloxi, Mississippi
- Hal Marx, Petal, Mississippi
- Dane Maxwell, Pascagoula, Mississippi
- Chipper McDermott, Pass Christian, Mississippi
- Rusty Quave, D'Iberville, Mississippi
- Mike Smith, Waveland, Mississippi

Organizations

- Americans for Prosperity Action
- Mississippi Manufacturers Association
- Mississippi Right to Life PAC
- NRA Political Victory Fund

Individuals

- Brett Favre, Super Bowl champion
- Jake Mangum, professional baseball outfielder
Bill Waller Jr.

State legislators

- Robert Foster, former candidate for governor (endorsed in run-off election)

Individuals

- Dan Fordice, son of former Governor Kirk Fordice
- Billy Mounger, former Mississippi Republican Party chairman
- Billy Powell, former Mississippi Republican Party chairman
- Clarke Reed, former Mississippi Republican Party chairman
- Michael Retzer, former Mississippi Republican Party chairman

=== Polling ===
Poll source	Date(s) administered	Sample size (Note: Key: A – all adults RV – registered voters LV – likely voters V – unclear)	Margin of error	Robert Foster	Tate Reeves	Bill Waller Jr.	Undecided
Mason-Dixon	July 24–27, 2019	500	± 4.5%	13%	41%	31%	15%
Impact Management Group	June 10–14, 2019	354	± 5.3%	9%	50%	19%	28%
Mason-Dixon	January 30 – February 1, 2019	400	± 5.0%	9%	62%	–	29%

Hypothetical polling

Poll source	Date(s) administered	Sample size	Margin of error	Lynn Fitch	Tate Reeves	Undecided
JMC Analytics	February 15–17, 2018	500	± 4.4%	12%	21%	67%
Mason-Dixon	December 13–15, 2017	400	± 5.0%	18%	37%	45%

=== Results ===
First round results by county: Reeves: 30–40%; 40–50%; 50–60%; 60–70%; Waller: 40–50%; 50–60%; 60–70%; Foster: 40–50%

Republican primary results
Party	Candidate	Votes	%
Republican	Tate Reeves	187,312	48.9
Republican	Bill Waller Jr.	128,010	33.4
Republican	Robert Foster	67,758	17.7
Total votes		383,080	100.0

=== Runoff ===
Runoff results by county Reeves: 50–60%; 60–70%; 70–80%; 80–90%; Waller: 50–60%; 60–70%

Republican primary runoff results
Party	Candidate	Votes	%
Republican	Tate Reeves	179,623	54.1
Republican	Bill Waller Jr.	152,201	45.9
Total votes		331,824	100.0

== Democratic primary ==
=== Candidates ===
==== Nominee ====
- Jim Hood, Mississippi attorney general

==== Eliminated in primary ====
- Michael Brown
- William Bond Compton Jr., candidate for governor of Mississippi in 2007 and 2011, candidate for the U.S. Senate in 2014, nominee for the Mississippi House of Representatives in the 83rd district in 2015
- Robert J. Ray
- Robert Shuler Smith, Hinds County district attorney
- Gregory Wash
- Velesha Williams, former director for the Metro Jackson Community Prevention Coalition and former U.S. Army officer
- Albert Wilson, businessman and community organizer

==== Withdrawn ====
- Phillip West, former state representative and former mayor of Natchez (endorsed Jim Hood)

==== Declined ====
- Anthony Witherspoon, mayor of Magnolia

=== Endorsements ===
Jim Hood

U.S. Executive Branch officials

- Ray Mabus, 75th United States secretary of the Navy and former governor of Mississippi

Statewide officials
State legislators

- Earle S. Banks, Mississippi state representative
- Chris Bell, Mississippi state representative
- David Blount, Mississippi state senator
- Jarvis Dortch, Mississippi state representative
- Sollie Norwood, Mississippi state senator

=== Polling ===
Poll source	Date(s) administered	Sample size	Margin of error	Jim Hood	Robert Shuler Smith	Undecided
Triumph Campaigns	January 29, 2018	2,145	± 1.8%	36%	34%	30%

Hypothetical polling

Poll source	Date(s) administered	Sample size	Margin of error	Jim Hood	Chokwe Antar Lumumba	Undecided
Triumph Campaigns	January 29, 2018	2,145	± 1.8%	49%	27%	23%

=== Results ===
Results by county: Hood: 30–40%; 40–50%; 50–60%; 60–70%; 70–80%; 80–90%

Democratic primary results
Party	Candidate	Votes	%
Democratic	Jim Hood	208,634	69.0
Democratic	Michael Brown	33,247	11.0
Democratic	Velesha Williams	20,844	6.9
Democratic	Robert Shuler Smith	20,395	6.7
Democratic	Robert Ray	5,609	1.8
Democratic	William Bond Compton Jr.	5,321	1.8
Democratic	Albert Wilson	5,122	1.7
Democratic	Gregory Wash	3,218	1.1
Total votes		302,390	100.0

== Other candidates ==
=== Constitution Party ===
Declared

- Bob Hickingbottom

=== Independents ===
Declared

- David Singletary, U.S. Air Force veteran and former hotel owner

== General election ==
=== Predictions ===
Source	Ranking	As of
The Cook Political Report	Lean R	October 15, 2019
Inside Elections	Lean R	November 8, 2019
Sabato's Crystal Ball	Lean R	November 8, 2019

=== Debates ===
Dates	Location	Hood	Reeves	Link
October 10, 2019	University of Southern Mississippi; Hattiesburg	Participant	Participant	
October 14, 2019	WCBI Studios; Columbus	Participant	Participant	

=== Endorsements ===
Tate Reeves (R)

U.S. Executive Branch officials

- Mike Pence, 48th vice president of the United States
- Donald Trump, 45th president of the United States

Members of Congress

- Cindy Hyde-Smith, U.S. senator (R-MS)
- Trent Kelly, U.S. representative (R-MS)
- Roger Wicker, U.S. senator (R-MS)

Statewide officials

- Haley Barbour, former governor of Mississippi
- Phil Bryant, governor of Mississippi
- Jeb Bush, former governor of Florida
- Pete Ricketts, governor of Nebraska

State legislators

- Robert Foster, Mississippi state representative
- Chris Johnson, Mississippi state representative
- Chris McDaniel, Mississippi state senator
- John A. Polk, Mississippi state senator

Mayors

- Fofo Gilich, Biloxi, Mississippi
- Hal Marx, Petal, Mississippi
- Dane Maxwell, Pascagoula, Mississippi
- Chipper McDermott, Pass Christian, Mississippi
- Rusty Quave, D'Iberville, Mississippi
- Mike Smith, Waveland, Mississippi

Organizations

- Americans for Prosperity Action
- Mississippi Manufacturers Association
- Mississippi Right to Life PAC
- NRA Political Victory Fund

Individuals

- Brett Favre, Super Bowl champion
- Jake Mangum, professional baseball outfielder
Jim Hood (D)

U.S. Executive Branch officials

- Ray Mabus, 75th United States secretary of the Navy and former governor of Mississippi
- Barack Obama, 44th president of the United States

Statewide officials

- John Bel Edwards, governor of Louisiana

State legislators

- Stacey Abrams, 2018 Democratic nominee for governor of Georgia, former minority leader of the Georgia House of Representatives
- Earle S. Banks, Mississippi state representative
- Chris Bell, Mississippi state representative
- David Blount, Mississippi state senator
- Jarvis Dortch, Mississippi state representative
- Sollie Norwood, Mississippi state senator

Mayors

- Jason Shelton, mayor of Tupelo

Organizations

- Democratic Governors Association
- Mississippi Association of Educators

Individuals

- Grey DeLisle, voice actress and activist

=== Polling ===
View source data.

Poll source	Date(s) administered	Sample size	Margin of error	Tate Reeves (R)	Jim Hood (D)	David Singletary (I)	Bob Hickingbottom (C)	Undecided
NBC/Survey Monkey	October 8–22, 2019	1,002 (RV)	± 4.7%	47%	40%	7%	2%	3%
Targoz Market Research	October 13–20, 2019	384 (LV)	–	47%	46%	–	–	7%
Mason-Dixon	October 17–19, 2019	625 (LV)	± 4.0%	46%	43%	–	–	9%
Hickman Analytics	October 13–16, 2019	508 (LV)	± 4.4%	42%	46%	–	–	–
Hickman Analytics (D) (Note: Poll sponsored by the Jim Hood campaign)	September 22–26, 2019	500 (LV)	± 4.0%	42%	45%	–	–	–
Hickman Analytics (D)	August 11–15, 2019	600 (LV)	± 4.0%	42%	43%	–	–	–
NBC News/SurveyMonkey	July 2–16, 2019	1,171 (RV)	± 4.2%	51%	42%	–	–	6%
Impact Management Group	June 10–14, 2019	610 (LV)	± 4.0%	48%	36%	4%	–	12%
Hickman Analytics (D)	May 5–9, 2019	604 (LV)	± 4.0%	40%	45%	–	–	–
Mason-Dixon	January 30 – February 1, 2019	625 (RV)	± 4.0%	42%	44%	–	–	14%
OnMessage Inc. (R) (Note: Poll sponsored by the Tate Reeves campaign)	January 28–30, 2019	600 (RV)	± 3.5%	51%	36%	–	–	13%
Mason-Dixon	April 12–14, 2018	625 (RV)	± 4.0%	39%	44%	–	–	17%
Chism Strategies/Millsaps College	December 15–19, 2017	578 (RV)	± 4.1%	45%	38%	–	–	18%
Mason-Dixon	December 13–15, 2017	625 (RV)	± 4.0%	37%	43%	–	–	20%

Hypothetical polling

with Tate Reeves, Jim Hood, and Bill Waller Jr.

Poll source	Date(s) administered	Sample size	Margin of error	Tate Reeves (R)	Jim Hood (D)	Bill Waller Jr. (I)	Undecided
Mason-Dixon	January 30 – February 1, 2019	625 (RV)	± 4.0%	38%	40%	9%	13%

with Bill Waller Jr. and Jim Hood

Poll source	Date(s) administered	Sample size	Margin of error	Bill Waller Jr. (R)	Jim Hood (D)	David Singletary (I)	Undecided
NBC News/SurveyMonkey	July 2–16, 2019	1,171 (RV)	± 4.2%	53%	41%	–	6%
Impact Management Group	June 10–14, 2019	610 (LV)	± 4.0%	43%	36%	4%	17%

=== Results ===
Candidate	Party	Popular vote		Electoral vote	
Candidate	Party	Votes	%	Votes	%
Tate Reeves	Republican Party	459,396	51.91	73	59.84
Jim Hood	Democratic Party	414,368	46.83	49	40.16
David Singletary	Independent	8,522	0.96		
Bob Hickingbottom	Constitution Party	2,625	0.30		
Total		884,911	100.00	122	100.00
Source: Mississippi Secretary of State

==== By county ====
County	Tate Reeves Republican		Jim Hood Democratic		Various candidates Other parties		Margin		Total
County	#	%	#	%	#	%	#	%	Total
Adams	4,132	38.82%	6,387	60.00%	126	1.18%	-2,255	-21.18%	10,645
Alcorn	8,629	75.47%	2,649	23.17%	156	1.36%	5,980	52.30%	11,434
Amite	2,914	55.70%	2,252	43.04%	66	1.26%	662	12.65%	5,232
Attala	3,154	53.31%	2,713	45.86%	49	0.83%	441	7.45%	5,916
Benton	1,526	59.01%	1,025	39.64%	35	1.35%	501	19.37%	2,586
Bolivar	3,224	31.96%	6,761	67.01%	104	1.03%	-3,537	-35.06%	10,089
Calhoun	3,009	59.05%	2,029	39.82%	58	1.14%	980	19.23%	5,096
Carroll	2,653	63.82%	1,465	35.24%	39	0.94%	1,188	28.58%	4,157
Chickasaw	2,437	37.70%	3,987	61.68%	40	0.62%	-1,550	-23.98%	6,464
Choctaw	1,977	65.03%	1,020	33.55%	43	1.41%	957	31.48%	3,040
Claiborne	472	12.79%	3,178	86.15%	39	1.06%	-2,706	-73.35%	3,689
Clarke	3,840	59.93%	2,451	38.25%	117	1.83%	1,389	21.68%	6,408
Clay	2,801	38.38%	4,452	61.00%	45	0.62%	-1,651	-22.62%	7,298
Coahoma	1,427	29.40%	3,375	69.54%	51	1.05%	-1,948	-40.14%	4,853
Copiah	4,041	41.44%	5,643	57.87%	68	0.70%	-1,602	-16.43%	9,752
Covington	3,952	54.63%	3,169	43.81%	113	1.56%	783	10.82%	7,234
DeSoto	22,565	60.92%	13,976	37.73%	502	1.36%	8,589	23.19%	37,043
Forrest	10,380	49.60%	10,223	48.85%	326	1.56%	157	0.75%	20,929
Franklin	2,091	56.98%	1,502	40.93%	77	2.10%	589	16.05%	3,670
George	4,452	81.58%	951	17.43%	54	0.99%	3,501	64.16%	5,457
Greene	2,967	72.58%	1,039	25.42%	82	2.01%	1,928	47.16%	4,088
Grenada	3,685	50.25%	3,556	48.49%	92	1.25%	129	1.76%	7,333
Hancock	8,358	70.89%	3,278	27.80%	154	1.31%	5,080	43.09%	11,790
Harrison	25,836	58.07%	17,955	40.36%	700	1.57%	7,881	17.71%	44,491
Hinds	15,604	21.56%	56,131	77.55%	649	0.90%	-40,527	-55.99%	72,384
Holmes	1,037	16.10%	5,347	83.03%	56	0.87%	-4,310	-66.93%	6,440
Humphreys	745	25.57%	2,152	73.85%	17	0.58%	-1,407	-48.28%	2,914
Issaquena	202	40.16%	293	58.25%	8	1.59%	-91	-18.09%	503
Itawamba	5,788	77.49%	1,591	21.30%	90	1.20%	4,197	56.19%	7,469
Jackson	20,888	63.70%	11,433	34.87%	468	1.43%	9,455	28.84%	32,789
Jasper	2,591	43.15%	3,348	55.75%	66	1.10%	-757	-12.61%	6,005
Jefferson	369	11.07%	2,928	87.82%	37	1.11%	-2,559	-76.75%	3,334
Jefferson Davis	1,676	35.98%	2,946	63.25%	36	0.77%	-1,270	-27.26%	4,658
Jones	13,784	64.84%	7,123	33.51%	350	1.65%	6,661	31.34%	21,257
Kemper	1,439	34.76%	2,655	64.13%	46	1.11%	-1,216	-29.37%	4,140
Lafayette	7,122	45.98%	8,162	52.69%	207	1.34%	-1,040	-6.71%	15,491
Lamar	11,817	67.82%	5,359	30.75%	249	1.43%	6,458	37.06%	17,425
Lauderdale	11,829	55.90%	8,976	42.42%	356	1.68%	2,853	13.48%	21,161
Lawrence	2,985	57.93%	2,088	40.52%	80	1.55%	897	17.41%	5,153
Leake	3,638	52.54%	3,218	46.48%	68	0.98%	420	6.07%	6,924
Lee	14,672	58.29%	10,293	40.89%	207	0.82%	4,379	17.40%	25,172
Leflore	1,946	25.00%	5,625	72.25%	214	2.75%	-3,679	-47.26%	7,785
Lincoln	6,957	60.92%	4,342	38.02%	121	1.06%	2,615	22.90%	11,420
Lowndes	8,838	49.64%	8,822	49.55%	143	0.80%	16	0.09%	17,803
Madison	19,008	48.71%	19,670	50.40%	347	0.89%	-662	-1.70%	39,025
Marion	5,545	62.54%	3,215	36.26%	107	1.21%	2,330	26.28%	8,867
Marshall	4,197	46.03%	4,850	53.20%	70	0.77%	-653	-7.16%	9,117
Monroe	7,054	57.33%	5,149	41.84%	102	0.83%	1,905	15.48%	12,305
Montgomery	2,004	51.57%	1,821	46.86%	61	1.57%	183	4.71%	3,886
Neshoba	5,219	64.58%	2,770	34.27%	93	1.15%	2,449	30.30%	8,082
Newton	4,574	62.22%	2,618	35.61%	159	2.16%	1,956	26.61%	7,351
Noxubee	833	23.28%	2,727	76.22%	18	0.50%	-1,894	-52.93%	3,578
Oktibbeha	5,425	42.57%	7,195	56.46%	124	0.97%	-1,770	-13.89%	12,744
Panola	5,817	48.65%	5,976	49.98%	164	1.37%	-159	-1.33%	11,957
Pearl River	10,083	76.67%	2,856	21.72%	212	1.61%	7,227	54.95%	13,151
Perry	2,975	68.14%	1,327	30.39%	64	1.47%	1,648	37.75%	4,366
Pike	5,937	46.24%	6,772	52.75%	130	1.01%	-835	-6.50%	12,839
Pontotoc	6,599	68.44%	2,941	30.50%	102	1.06%	3,658	37.94%	9,642
Prentiss	5,030	64.84%	2,608	33.62%	120	1.55%	2,422	31.22%	7,758
Quitman	813	28.99%	1,937	69.08%	54	1.93%	-1,124	-40.09%	2,804
Rankin	29,861	64.01%	16,133	34.58%	660	1.41%	13,728	29.43%	46,654
Scott	4,058	51.54%	3,745	47.57%	70	0.89%	313	3.98%	7,873
Sharkey	449	27.39%	1,178	71.87%	12	0.73%	-729	-44.48%	1,639
Simpson	5,454	58.08%	3,784	40.29%	153	1.63%	1,670	17.78%	9,391
Smith	4,250	65.34%	2,158	33.18%	96	1.48%	2,092	32.16%	6,504
Stone	3,628	69.14%	1,530	29.16%	89	1.70%	2,098	39.98%	5,247
Sunflower	1,839	28.74%	4,505	70.41%	54	0.84%	-2,666	-41.67%	6,398
Tallahatchie	1,803	37.36%	2,929	60.69%	94	1.95%	-1,126	-23.33%	4,826
Tate	4,969	59.67%	3,215	38.61%	143	1.72%	1,754	21.06%	8,327
Tippah	5,205	72.15%	1,867	25.88%	142	1.97%	3,338	46.27%	7,214
Tishomingo	5,113	74.34%	1,654	24.05%	111	1.61%	3,459	50.29%	6,878
Tunica	637	27.34%	1,645	70.60%	48	2.06%	-1,008	-43.26%	2,330
Union	6,307	69.52%	2,649	29.20%	116	1.28%	3,658	40.32%	9,072
Walthall	2,657	55.01%	2,128	44.06%	45	0.93%	529	10.95%	4,830
Warren	6,709	46.84%	7,438	51.93%	176	1.23%	-729	-5.09%	14,323
Washington	3,336	27.51%	8,667	71.48%	122	1.01%	-5,331	-43.97%	12,125
Wayne	4,061	55.09%	3,211	43.56%	100	1.36%	850	11.53%	7,372
Webster	2,993	72.86%	1,077	26.22%	38	0.93%	1,916	46.64%	4,108
Wilkinson	1,057	30.23%	2,314	66.19%	125	3.58%	-1,257	-35.96%	3,496
Winston	3,342	51.07%	3,151	48.15%	51	0.78%	191	2.92%	6,544
Yalobusha	2,587	50.16%	2,486	48.21%	84	1.63%	101	1.96%	5,157
Yazoo	3,519	42.86%	4,604	56.08%	87	1.06%	-1,085	-13.22%	8,210
Totals	459,396	51.91%	414,368	46.83%	11,147	1.26%	45,028	5.09%	884,911

==== Counties that flipped from Republican to Democratic ====
- Adams (largest city: Natchez)
- Chickasaw (largest city: Houston)
- Clay (largest city: West Point)
- Copiah (largest city: Crystal Springs)
- Issaquena (largest city: Mayersville)
- Jasper (largest city: Bay Springs)
- Kemper (largest city: De Kalb)
- Lafayette (largest city: Oxford)
- Madison (largest city: Madison)
- Marshall (largest city: Holly Springs)
- Oktibbeha (largest city: Starkville)
- Panola (largest city: Batesville)
- Pike (largest city: McComb)
- Quitman (largest city: Marks)
- Sharkey (largest city: Rolling Fork)
- Tallahatchie (largest city: Charleston)
- Warren (largest city: Vicksburg)
- Yazoo (largest city: Yazoo City)

==== By congressional district ====
Reeves won three of four congressional districts.

District	Reeves	Hood	Representative
1st	59%	40%	Trent Kelly
2nd	32%	67%	Bennie Thompson
3rd	54%	45%	Michael Guest
4th	63%	35%	Steven Palazzo

== See also ==
- 2019 United States elections
- 2019 Mississippi elections

== Notes ==
Partisan clients
