= Kenny Griffis =

American judge

Associate Justice of the Mississippi Supreme Court
- Incumbent
- Assumed office February 1, 2019
- Appointed by: Phil Bryant
- Preceded by: Bill Waller Jr.

Judge of the Mississippi Court of Appeals
- In office January 1, 2003 – January 31, 2019
- Succeeded by: Cory T. Wilson

Personal details
- Born: Meridian, Mississippi, U.S.
- Education: University of Mississippi (BA, JD)

T. Kenneth Griffis Jr. is an associate justice of the Supreme Court of Mississippi. He previously served as Presiding Judge on the Mississippi Court of Appeals.

== Education and early life ==
Griffis attended Meridian Community College and Mississippi State University. He received his Bachelor of Accountancy and his Juris Doctor from the University of Mississippi. He was a certified public accountant from 1984 through 2007. Griffis has taught as an adjunct professor of law at the University of Mississippi School of Law, Mississippi College School of Law, Belhaven University and Meridian Community College.

== Judicial career ==
=== Mississippi Court of Appeals ===
Griffis was elected to the Court of Appeals in November 2002 and became a presiding judge in March 2011.

=== Supreme Court of Mississippi ===
On December 19, 2018 Governor Phil Bryant appointed Griffis to the Supreme Court to the seat vacated by William L. Waller Jr. who retired on January 31, 2019. He was sworn in on February 1, 2019.

== Personal life ==
Griffis is originally from Meridian, Mississippi. He currently resides in Ridgeland, Mississippi with his wife and five sons.

Legal offices
| Preceded by William L. Waller Jr. | Associate Justice of the Supreme Court of Mississippi; 2019–present | Incumbent |
