= Brad Oberhousen =

American politician (born 1978)

Member of the Mississippi House of Representatives from the 73rd district
- In office 2012–2016
- Preceded by: James Ellington
- Succeeded by: Cory T. Wilson

Personal details
- Born: February 22, 1978 (age 48) Jackson, Mississippi, United States
- Party: Democratic

Brad A. Oberhousen (born February 22, 1978) is an American Democratic Party politician. From 2012 to 2016 he served as a member of the Mississippi House of Representatives from the 73rd District, having been elected in 2011.
