= Ava Carroll Waller =

American preservationist and writer

Carroll Waller

First Lady of Mississippi
- In role January 18, 1972 – January 20, 1976
- Governor: Bill Waller
- Preceded by: Elizabeth Ann Wells Williams
- Succeeded by: Zelma Lois Smith Finch

Personal details
- Born: Ava Carroll Overton; August 8, 1927 McComb, Mississippi, U.S.
- Died: October 28, 2014 (aged 87) Jackson, Mississippi, U.S.
- Spouse: Bill Waller (m. 1950; died 2011)
- Children: 5, including Bill
- Education: Mississippi College

Ava Carroll Waller (August 8, 1927 – October 28, 2014) was an American preservationist, writer and former First Lady of the U.S. state of Mississippi. Waller served as the First Lady of Mississippi from 1972 to 1976 during the administration of her husband, the late Governor Bill Waller. Carroll Waller spearheaded the restoration of the Mississippi Governor's Mansion in Jackson, Mississippi. She also led the move to have the Governor's Mansion designated as a National Historic Landmark in 1975, which was only the second time that a governor's residence had been listed as an NHL in the U.S. Additionally, Waller helped to purchase and restore the Manship House in Jackson. In 1980, the Mississippi Historical Society awarded Carroll Waller its Award of Merit for her work in historic preservation in the state.

Carroll Waller was the mother of William L. Waller Jr., who has served as the Chief Justice of the Supreme Court of Mississippi since 2009. she died of a stroke on October 28, 2014, in Jackson Mississippi at age 87.

Waller was born Ava Carroll Overton in McComb, Mississippi, on August 8, 1927, to Dr. Clayton Justice Overton and Edith Watkins Overton. She graduated from Central High School in Jackson, Mississippi, and received a degree from Mississippi College in Clinton. She worked as an instructor at Belhaven College (now Belhaven University) and a salesperson at the House of Overton in Jackson early in her career.
