= Cory T. Wilson =

American judge (born 1970)

Cory Wilson

Judge of the United States Court of Appeals for the Fifth Circuit
- Incumbent
- Assumed office July 3, 2020
- Appointed by: Donald Trump
- Preceded by: E. Grady Jolly

Judge of the Mississippi Court of Appeals
- In office February 15, 2019 – July 3, 2020
- Appointed by: Phil Bryant
- Preceded by: Kenny Griffis
- Succeeded by: John Emfinger

Member of the Mississippi House of Representatives from the 73rd district
- In office January 5, 2016 – February 14, 2019
- Preceded by: Brad Oberhousen
- Succeeded by: Jill Ford

Personal details
- Born: Cory Todd Wilson; August 8, 1970 (age 56) Pascagoula, Mississippi, U.S.
- Party: Republican
- Education: University of Mississippi (BBA); Yale University (JD)

Cory Todd Wilson (born August 8, 1970) is an American attorney and jurist serving as a United States circuit judge of the United States Court of Appeals for the Fifth Circuit. He was appointed by President Donald Trump in 2020. A member of the Republican Party, Wilson was previously a judge on the Mississippi Court of Appeals and a member of the Mississippi House of Representatives.

== Early life and education ==
Wilson was born in 1970 in Pascagoula, Mississippi. He graduated from the University of Mississippi in 1992 with a Bachelor of Business Administration, summa cum laude, and also received the Taylor Medal in Economics, awarded to the top student in the department. He then attended Yale Law School, where he was a member of the Yale Law Journal and an Olin Fellow in Economics. He graduated in 1995 with a Juris Doctor.

== Legal and legislative career ==
Upon graduation from law school, Wilson served as a law clerk to Judge Emmett Ripley Cox of the United States Court of Appeals for the Eleventh Circuit. He also served as a White House Fellow in the Department of Defense as a Special Assistant to Secretary of Defense Donald Rumsfeld. Before serving in the Mississippi legislature, Wilson served as Senior Advisor and Counsel in the Mississippi State Treasurer's Office and as Deputy Secretary of State in the Mississippi Secretary of State's Office.

Wilson has been an intermittent member of the Federalist Society, including while at Yale Law School from 1992 to 1995, and then joining the Mississippi chapter from 1996 to 2005 and again since 2019.

=== Mississippi House of Representatives ===
Wilson served as a member of the Mississippi House of Representatives from 2016 to 2019.

== Judicial career ==
=== State judicial service ===
In December 2018, Wilson was appointed to the Mississippi Court of Appeals to the seat vacated by Kenny Griffis, who was elevated to the Mississippi Supreme Court. He was sworn into office on February 15, 2019. His service as a state judge ended on July 2, 2020, when he was elevated as a Circuit Judge to the Fifth Circuit Court.

=== Federal judicial service ===
==== Withdrawn nomination to district court ====
On August 28, 2019, President Donald Trump announced his intent to nominate Wilson to serve as a United States district judge for the United States District Court for the Southern District of Mississippi. On October 15, his nomination was sent to the Senate. President Trump nominated Wilson to the seat vacated by Judge Louis Guirola Jr., who assumed senior status on March 23, 2018. On January 3, 2020, his nomination was returned to the President under Rule XXXI, Paragraph 6 of the United States Senate. On January 6, 2020, his renomination was sent to the Senate. On January 8, 2020, the Senate Judiciary Committee held a hearing on his nomination. During his confirmation hearing, some senators asked about Wilson's past comments on social media about President Barack Obama, Hillary Clinton and Alexandria Ocasio-Cortez, as well as his previous positions, as a state legislator, on abortion, LGBT rights, the Affordable Care Act, and voting rights. His district-court nomination—which stalled as the first impeachment trial of President Trump was consuming the Senate and as the COVID-19 pandemic was beginning—was withdrawn on May 4, 2020, when he was nominated to the Fifth Circuit.

==== Court of appeals service ====
On March 30, 2020, President Donald Trump announced his intent to nominate Wilson to serve as a United States circuit judge for the United States Court of Appeals for the Fifth Circuit, to fill the seat vacated by Judge E. Grady Jolly, who assumed senior status on October 3, 2017. On May 4, 2020, his nomination was sent to the Senate. On May 18, 2020, the American Bar Association rated Wilson as "well qualified," its highest rating. On May 20, 2020, the Senate Judiciary Committee held a hearing on Wilson's nomination. On June 11, 2020, Wilson's nomination was reported out of committee by a 12–10 vote. On June 22, 2020, the Senate invoked cloture on Wilson's nomination by a 51–43 vote. On June 24, 2020, Wilson's nomination was confirmed by a 52–48 vote. Wilson's confirmation marked the 200th confirmation of a federal judge nominated by Donald Trump. Wilson was the sixth judge nominated by Trump to be confirmed to the Fifth Circuit. Wilson received his judicial commission on July 3, 2020.

In October 2022, with Wilson writing for a unanimous panel, the Fifth Circuit held that "Congress's cession of its power of the purse to the [Consumer Financial Protection] Bureau violates the Appropriations Clause and the Constitution's underlying structural separation of powers." The Supreme Court reversed the decision in Consumer Financial Protection Bureau v. Community Financial Services Ass'n of America, Ltd. (2024), because "[t]he statute that provides the Bureau’s funding" "authorizes expenditures from a specified source of public money for designated purposes." Justices Alito and Gorsuch dissented, disagreeing "that the Appropriations Clause is satisfied by any law that authorizes the Executive to take any amount of money from any source for any period of time for any lawful purpose."

In February 2023, with Wilson again writing for a unanimous panel, the Fifth Circuit held that—though the federal statute that prohibits the possession of firearms by people subject to domestic-violence restraining orders (after civil, rather than criminal, proceedings) "embodies salutary policy goals meant to protect vulnerable people in our society"—the statute is unconstitutional in light of the Supreme Court's decision in New York State Rifle & Pistol Association, Inc. v. Bruen. The Fifth Circuit concluded that the statute at issue failed Bruen's history-and-tradition test because, "[w]here the [historical] surety laws imposed a conditional, partial restriction on the Second Amendment right, [the statute] works an absolute deprivation of the right, not only publicly to carry, but to possess any firearm." The Supreme Court reversed the decision in United States v. Rahimi (2024), on the general ground that "our Nation’s firearm laws have included provisions preventing individuals who threaten physical harm to others from misusing firearms." Justice Thomas, the author of Bruen, dissented.

== See also ==
- Donald Trump judicial appointment controversies

Legal offices
Preceded by E. Grady Jolly	Judge of the United States Court of Appeals for the Fifth Circuit; 2020–present	Incumbent
