= TRNA (adenine22-N1)-methyltransferase =

TRNA (adenine^{22}-N^{1})-methyltransferase

Identifiers
- EC no.: 2.1.1.217

Databases
- IntEnz: IntEnz view
- BRENDA: BRENDA entry
- ExPASy: NiceZyme view
- KEGG: KEGG entry
- MetaCyc: metabolic pathway
- PRIAM: profile
- PDB structures: RCSB PDB PDBe PDBsum
Search
- PMC: articles
- PubMed: articles
- NCBI: proteins

TRNA (adenine^{22}-N^{1})-methyltransferase (EC 2.1.1.217, TrmK, YqfN, Sp1610 (gene), tRNA: m1A22 methyltransferase) is an enzyme with systematic name S-adenosyl-L-methionine:tRNA (adenine^{22}-N^{1})-methyltransferase. This enzyme catalyses the following chemical reaction

S-adenosyl-L-methionine + adenine^{22} in tRNA $\rightleftharpoons$ S-adenosyl-L-homocysteine + N^{1}-methyladenine^{22} in tRNA

The enzyme specifically methylates adenine^{22} in tRNA.
