= Bill Waller Jr. =

American judge

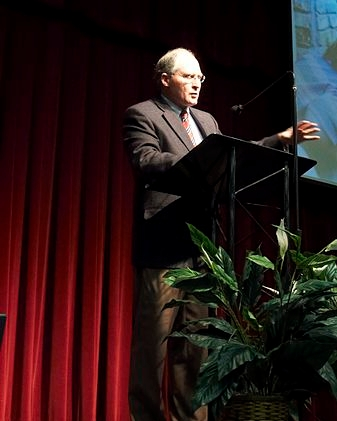

Chief Justice of the Mississippi Supreme Court
- In office January 5, 2009 – January 31, 2019
- Preceded by: James W. Smith Jr.
- Succeeded by: Michael K. Randolph

Justice of the Mississippi Supreme Court
- In office January 1998 – January 31, 2019
- Preceded by: Dan Lee
- Succeeded by: Kenny Griffis

Personal details
- Born: William Lowe Waller Jr. February 9, 1952 (age 74) Jackson, Mississippi, U.S.
- Party: Republican
- Spouse: Charlotte Brawner
- Parents: Bill Waller; Carroll Overton
- Education: Mississippi State University (BA); University of Mississippi (JD)

Military service
- Allegiance: United States
- Branch/service: United States Army
- Rank: Brigadier General
- Unit: Mississippi Army National Guard

William Lowe Waller Jr. (born February 9, 1952) is an American judge who served on the Supreme Court of Mississippi from 1998 to 2019. A member of the Republican Party, he was chief justice for his last decade in office. Waller was a candidate for the Republican nomination of Governor of Mississippi in the 2019 election, but was defeated by Lieutenant Governor Tate Reeves.

== Early life and education ==
Waller, a native and current resident of Jackson, Mississippi, is the son of William "Bill" Waller. Sr., the Governor of Mississippi from 1972 to 1976, and Carroll Waller. The junior Waller graduated from Murrah High School and Mississippi State University in 1974, where he was a member of the Sigma Phi Epsilon fraternity. He received his Juris Doctor from the University of Mississippi School of Law in 1977.

== Career ==
Waller practiced law with the firm of Waller and Waller in Jackson for over 20 years and served as a Municipal Judge for the City of Jackson. Waller was elected to the Mississippi Supreme Court in November 1996, for a term beginning in January 1998. He won reelection in November 2004. He served as a Presiding Justice from January 2004 until December 2008, and assumed the position of Chief Justice in January 2009.

Waller has sought to bring reforms in the administration of justice. He supported adoption by the Supreme Court of mediation rules for civil litigation and served as chairman of the Mississippi Public Defender Task Force from 2000 to 2005. Waller was principal architect of what became legislation that created the Office of Capital Post Conviction Counsel, the Office of Indigent Appeals and the Comprehensive Electronic Court Systems Fund. Waller served as chairman of the Supreme Court Rules Committee from 2001 to 2008. In 2012, he led efforts that resulted in the passage of judicial compensation reform legislation.

In March 2018, Chief Justice Waller and Justice King dissented when the majority of the Mississippi Supreme Court found that sentencing a juvenile to life without parole did not violate Miller v. Alabama (2012).

Waller is a member of the Stennis Institute Advisory Board at Mississippi State University. He is an Eagle Scout and serves on the advisory board of the Andrew Jackson Council, Boy Scouts of America. Justice Waller serves on the adjunct faculty of the Mississippi College School of Law.

=== 2019 gubernatorial candidacy ===
Waller was a candidate for Governor of Mississippi in the 2019 primary election. Failing to achieve 50 percent of the vote in the primary, two candidates – Waller and lieutenant governor Tate Reeves – were forced into a runoff, where Reeves won with 54 percent.

== Military career ==
Presently assigned to the Retired Reserve, Justice Waller attained the rank of Brigadier General while serving as commander of the 66th Troop Command, Mississippi Army National Guard, Jackson, Mississippi.

== Awards and recognition ==
- Judicial Innovation Award (2003–2004) by the Hinds County Bar Association and the Jackson Young Lawyers Association
- Chief Justice Award (2005) for his work as chairman of a special study committee to develop a statewide e-filing and docket management system
- Mississippi State University Pre-Law Society’s Distinguished Jurist award (2009)
- Judicial Excellence Award (2011–2012) from the Capital Area Bar Association and the Jackson Young Lawyers Association.
- Honorary Doctor of Laws degree (2012) from Mississippi College School of Law

== Personal life ==
Waller and his wife, Charlotte, have three children and are members of First Baptist Church Jackson, where he has served as chairman of the deacons.

Legal offices
| Preceded by Dan M. Lee | Justice of the Mississippi Supreme Court; 1998–2019 | Succeeded by Kenny Griffis |
| Preceded by James W. Smith Jr. | Chief Justice of Mississippi Supreme Court; 2009–2019 | Succeeded by Michael K. Randolph |
