= Robert Foster (politician) =

American politician

Robert Dolton Foster

Member of the Mississippi House of Representatives from the 28th district
- In office January 5, 2016 – January 7, 2020
- Preceded by: Tommy Taylor
- Succeeded by: Jerry Darnell

Personal details
- Born: April 8, 1983 (age 43) Memphis, Tennessee, U.S.
- Party: Republican
- Spouse: Heather Hartfield
- Education: University of Mississippi (BBA)
- Website: governor.ms

Robert Dolton Foster (born April 8, 1983) is an American politician from the state of Mississippi. A Republican, he served in the Mississippi House of Representatives. He was an unsuccessful candidate for governor of Mississippi in the 2019 election.

== Political career ==
Foster was first elected to the Mississippi House in November 2015. In 2017, Foster authored the current Mississippi death penalty law, which allows for executions by gas chamber, electrocution, and firing squad. Foster also introduced legislation in 2017 that would have “remove[d] affirmative action, multiculturalism and sanctuary of illegal alien students” from public universities in the state, though the bill didn't pass.

Foster runs Cedar Hill Farm, an agritourism business in DeSoto County, Mississippi. During the 2019 Mississippi gubernatorial election, Foster portrayed himself as a conservative outsider aligned with Donald Trump.

As a gubernatorial candidate, Foster's support for Medicaid expansion received criticism from fellow Mississippi Republican Chris McDaniel. Foster explained his support by arguing:

"We're sticking our head in the sand because we don't like the policy of Obamacare. I think it's bad policy. The ACA is bad policy that had a lot of flaws, but it is the law of the land, and Mississippi is going to have to do what's in our best interest until that law is changed in Washington."

== Controversies ==
=== 2019 journalist controversy ===
Foster received national attention in July 2019 when he refused to allow a female journalist from Mississippi Today to interview him alone, which she said constituted sexism. Foster said that his position was grounded in a fear that he could be accused of being in an "inappropriate relationship" if he was seen alone with a woman other than his wife, something he called the Billy Graham rule.

=== 2022 call to execute trans rights supporters ===
On March 24, 2022, Foster tweeted that trans rights supporters should be executed by firing squad. When confronted by fellow Republican Spencer Ritchie, he called him a RINO who has conceded power to communists. Foster also said that executing trans rights supporters would be an early divine judgment.
