= Trustmark (bank) =

American bank holding company

Trustmark Corporation

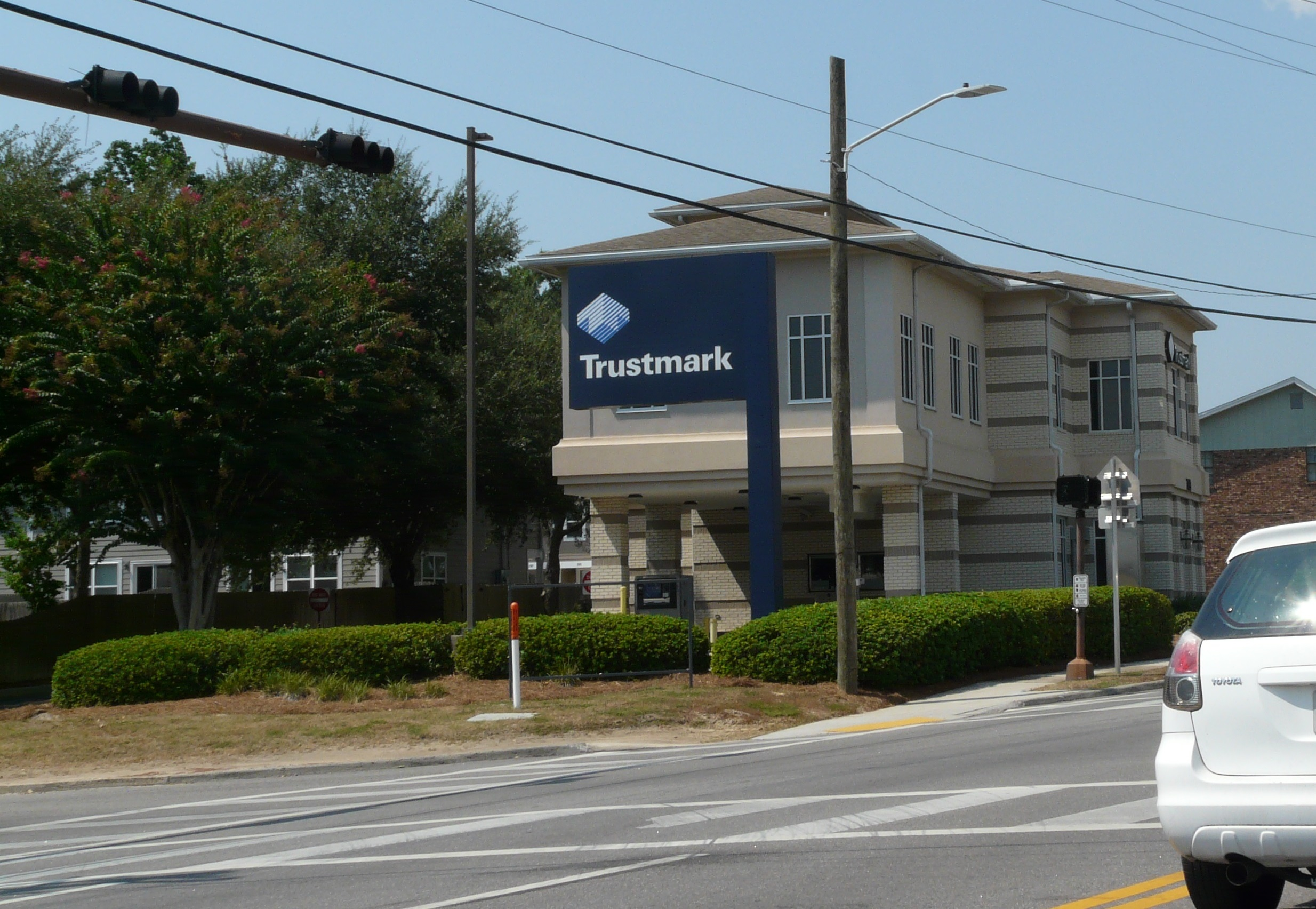
- Branch in Niceville, Florida
- Type: Public company
- Traded as: Nasdaq: TRMK; S&P 600 component Russell 2000 Index component
- Industry: Banking; Financial services
- Predecessors: The Jackson Bank; Jackson State National Bank; First National Bank; First Capital Corporation
- Founded: November 14, 1889; 136 years ago (as The Jackson Bank); 1949; 77 years ago (as First National Bank of Jackson); 1968; 58 years ago (as First Capital Corporation); September 17, 1985; 41 years ago (as Trustmark National Bank)
- Headquarters: Jackson, Mississippi, U.S.
- Area served: Mississippi; Alabama; Florida; Tennessee; Texas
- Key people: Gerard R. Host, President and CEO; Duane A Dewey, COO; William G. Yates, Director
- Products: Retail banking Commercial bank Credit cards Mortgage loans
- Revenue: ▲$878 million (2023)
- Net income: ▲$165 million (2023)
- Total assets: ▲$18.722 billion (2023)
- Total equity: ▲$1.661 billion (2023)
- Number of employees: 2,757 (2023)
- Website: www.trustmark.com

Trustmark Corporation is an American bank holding company headquartered in Jackson, Mississippi. It provides banking services and wealth management services. The bank serves Mississippi, Alabama, the Florida Panhandle, Memphis, and Houston. As of December 31, 2023, the bank operated 163 full-service branches, 7 limited-service branches, and 131 ATMs.

== History ==
The bank traces its roots to The Jackson Bank, which was chartered by the State of Mississippi in December 1889 with cash capital of $100,000. Its first president was P.W. Peeples.

In 1998, the company acquired Bottrell Insurance.

In 2011, the bank acquired Heritage Banking Group in a transaction facilitated by the Federal Deposit Insurance Corporation.

In 2012, the bank acquired Bay Bank & Trust Co.

In 2017, Trustmark acquired Reliance Bank.

In 2022, the company sold its corporate trust business.

In 2024, the company sold Fisher Brown Bottrell Insurance to Marsh McLennan for $345 million.
