= 2020 Mississippi elections =

Mississippi state elections in 2020 were held on Tuesday, November 3, 2020. Its primaries were held on March 10, 2020, with runoffs taking place on June 23.

In addition to the U.S. presidential race, Mississippi voters elected the Class II U.S. senator from Mississippi, all of Mississippi's seats to the House of Representatives, and four of nine seats on the Mississippi Supreme Court. They also voted on three ballot measures.

== Federal offices ==
=== President of the United States ===
Mississippi has six electoral votes in the Electoral College.

=== United States House of Representatives ===
Three U.S. Representatives in Mississippi were up for election, in addition to one open seat.

== State judiciary ==
All four incumbents whose seats were up for reelection were running again.

== Ballot measures ==
=== Legalization of medical marijuana ===
Ballot Measure 1 Legalization of medical marijuana
- 3 November 2020
- 65: Should Mississippi allow qualified patients with debilitating medical conditions, as certified by Mississippi licensed physicians, to use medical marijuana? 65A: Shall Mississippi establish a program to allow the medical use of marijuana products by qualified persons with debilitating medical conditions?
- Website: https://www.sos.ms.gov/Elections-Voting/Pages/2020-General-Election.aspx

Results
For approval of either Initiative 65 or 65A	61.65%
Against both Initiative 65 or 65A	28.32%
Choice: For Initiative 65	57.89%
Choice: For Initiative 65A	20.68%
For
80%–90%
70%–80%
60%–70%
50%–60%
Against
50%–60%

Legalization of medical marijuana comes with two choices for voters. The first vote is for the approval of either initiative or neither. The following choice is between either 65 or 65A. Voting for Initiative 65 supports approving the medical marijuana amendment as provided by Initiative 65, which would allow medical marijuana treatment for 22 specified qualifying conditions, allow individuals to possess up to 2.5 ounces of marijuana at one time, and tax marijuana sales at the current state sales tax rate of 7%. Voting for Alternative 65A supports approving the legislature's alternative medical marijuana amendment, which would restrict smoking marijuana to terminally ill patients; require pharmaceutical-grade marijuana products and treatment oversight by licensed physicians, nurses, and pharmacists; and leave tax rates, possession limits, and certain other details to be set by the legislature.

Initiative 65 would legalize possession of up to 2.5 ounces (71 g) of medical marijuana for people with 22 kinds of pre-existing conditions. It would also implement a tax for medical marijuana, allow its consumption in all but public places, cap the cost for medical marijuana ID cards at $50 per card, issue these cards by August 15, 2021, and delegate administration of medical marijuana to the state Department of Health. Alternative 65A would legalize possession of an as-of-yet unspecified amount of medical marijuana for terminally ill patients with as-of-yet unspecified pre-existing conditions, would not necessarily delegate responsibility for administration to the state Department of Health, would not cap costs for medical marijuana ID cards, would not set a tax rate for the substance and would not set a deadline by which cards had to be issued.

Initiative 65	Alternative 65A
Introduced by petition	Introduced by legislature
22 specified diseases	No specified diseases
Allows all specified diseases to smoke	Only terminally ill patients can smoke, others in other forms such as pills
Start date: August 2021	No specified start date
Free market	Limited license cap
Tax capped at 7%	Allows legislature to set sales tax rate, potentially at higher levels such as alcohol or tobacco
Regulated by Mississippi State Department of Health	State agency to be named

==== Polling ====
On Initiative 65 and Alternative 65A (collectively, Measure 1)

Poll source	Date(s) administered	Sample size (Note: Key: A – all adults RV – registered voters LV – likely voters V – unclear)	Margin of error	For Initiative 65	For Alternative 65A	For Both	For Neither	Undecided
FM3 Research	May 24–31, 2020	602 (LV)	± 4%	52%	23%	5%	6%	14%

On Whether Medical Marijuana Should Be Legal

Poll source	Date(s) administered	Sample size	Margin of error	Yes	No
Millsaps College/Chism Strategies	January 2–4, 2019	687 (LV)	± 3.4%	67%	24%

==== Results ====
Option	Votes	
Option	Num.	%
Approval of Initiative 65 or Alternative 65A
For approval of either Initiative 65 or Alternative 65A	816,107	61.65
Against both Initiative 65 or Alternative 65A	374,931	28.32
Blank/invalid votes	132,803	10.03
Total	1,323,841	100.00
Adoption of either Initiative 65 or Alternative 65A
For Initiative 65	766,478	57.89
For Alternative 65A	273,805	20.68
Blank/invalid votes	283,755	21.43
Total	1,324,038	100.00
Source: Mississippi Secretary of State

=== Elimination of state electoral college ===
Ballot Measure 2 Elimination of statewide electoral college
- 3 November 2020
- This amendment provides that to be elected Governor, or to any other statewide office, a candidate must receive a majority of the votes in the general election. If no candidate receives a majority of the votes, then a runoff election shall be held as provided by general law. The requirement of receiving the most votes in a majority of Mississippi House of Representative's districts is removed.

Results
Choice	Votes	%
Yes	984,788	79.28%
No	257,314	20.72%
For
80%–90%
70%–80%
60%–70%

A "yes" vote supports the following: removing the requirement that a candidate for governor or elected state office receive the most votes in a majority of the state's 122 House of Representatives districts (the electoral vote requirement), removing the role of the Mississippi House of Representatives in choosing a winner if no candidate receives majority approval, and providing that a candidate for governor or state office must receive a majority vote of the people to win and that a runoff election will be held between the two highest vote-getters if no candidate receives a majority vote.

A "no" vote opposes this amendment to establish runoff elections for governor and state offices, thereby maintaining the electoral vote requirement and that the House of Representatives will vote for a winner if no candidate receives a majority or in the event of a tie.

==== Polling ====
Poll source	Date(s) administered	Sample size	Margin of error	For Measure 2	Against Measure 2	Undecided
Civiqs/Daily Kos	October 23–26, 2020	507 (LV)	± 5.3%	54%	25%	21%

==== Results ====
Option	Votes	
Option	Num.	%
Yes (eliminate statewide electoral college)	984,788	74.38
No (retain statewide electoral college)	257,314	19.43
Blank/invalid votes	81,885	6.19
Total	1,323,987	100.00
Source: Mississippi Secretary of State

=== Approval of new state flag design ===
Ballot Measure 3 Approval of new state flag design
- 3 November 2020

Results
Choice	Votes	%
Yes	943,918	72.98%
No	349,522	27.02%
For
80%–90%
70%–80%
60%–70%
50%–60%
Against
50%–60%

Voters may vote either yes to adopt the new flag or no to oppose adopting the new state flag. If the new proposed flag is rejected by voters, the Commission to Redesign the Mississippi State Flag will reconvene, design another flag, and allow voters to approve or reject it at a special election in November 2021.

==== Polling ====
Poll source	Date(s) administered	Sample size	Margin of error	For Measure 3	Against Measure 3	Undecided
Civiqs/Daily Kos	October 23–26, 2020	507 (LV)	± 5.3%	61%	38%	8%

==== Results ====
Option	Votes	
Option	Num.	%
Yes (adopt new flag)	943,918	71.29
No (do not adopt new flag)	349,522	26.40
Blank/invalid votes	30,609	2.31
Total	1,324,049	100.00
Source: Mississippi Secretary of State

== See also ==
- Voter suppression in the United States 2019–2020: Mississippi
- Bilingual elections requirement for Mississippi (per Voting Rights Act Amendments of 2006)
