= 2024 Mississippi Supreme Court election =

- November 5, 2024 (first round); November 26, 2024 (runoff)

Elections to the Mississippi Supreme Court were held on November 5, 2024, to elect four of the court's nine justices. Judicial elections in Mississippi are nonpartisan, and justices serve for 8-year staggered terms, with three being elected from each of the state's three divisions, which are also used for the Mississippi Transportation Commission and the Mississippi Public Service Commission.

Justices Jim Kitchens in District 1 and Dawn H. Beam in District 2 were defeated, and Justices Robert P. Chamberlin and Jimmy Maxwell in District 3 were re-elected unopposed.

== District 1 Position 3 ==
District 1 Position 3 election
- November 5, 2024 (first round); November 26, 2024 (runoff)
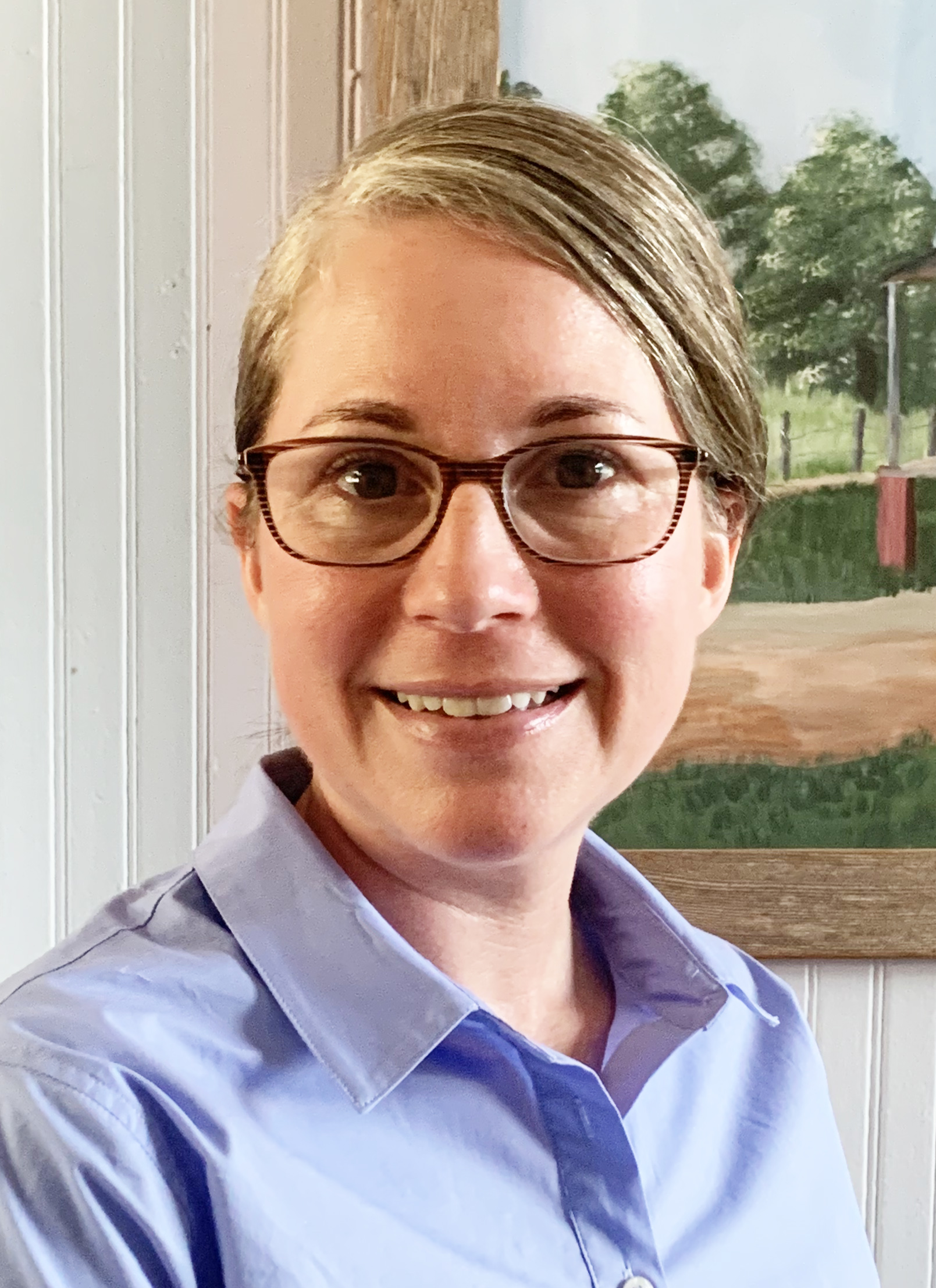

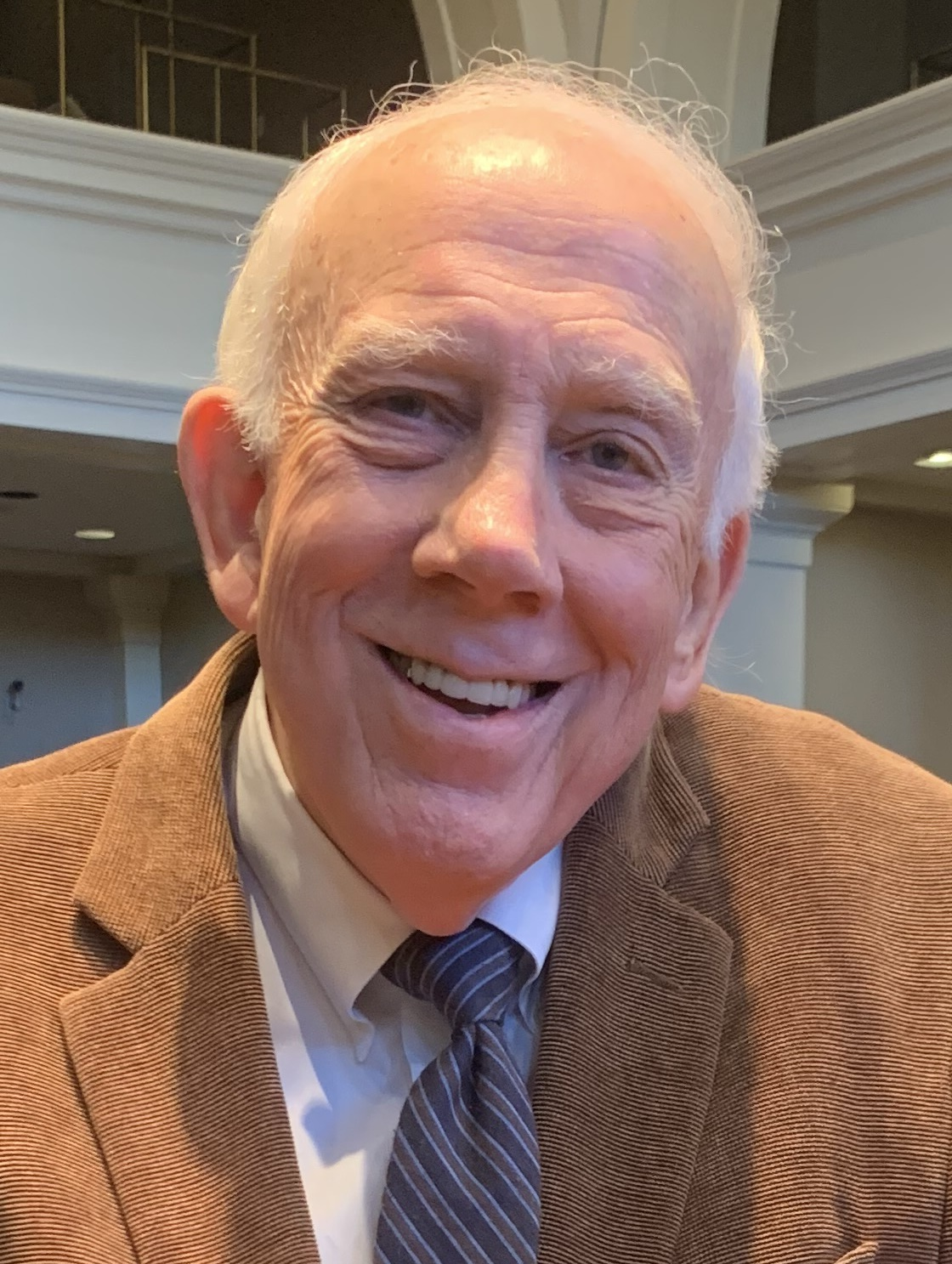

Nominee	Jenifer Branning	Jim Kitchens	Ceola James
First round	147,892; 41.34%	127,266; 35.58%	38,345; 10.72%
Runoff	64,087; 50.55%	62,685; 49.45%	Eliminated
Nominee	Byron Carter	Abby Robinson
First round	25,390; 7.10%	18,824; 5.26%
Runoff	Eliminated	Eliminated
- Branning: 20–30% 30–40% 40–50% 50–60% 60–70% 70–80% 80–90% 90–100% Kitchens: 30–40% 40–50% 50–60% 60–70% 70–80% 80–90% Jones: 30–40% 40–50% 50–60% 60–70% Tie: 20–30% 30–40% 40–50% 50% No data
Justice before election
Jim Kitchens
Elected Justice
Jenifer Branning

Two-term incumbent justice James W. Kitchens sought re-election to a third term, attracting four challengers to the seat. Kitchens, who has been identified as a centrist and had the support of many Democratic politicians, trailed in the first round to Jenifer Branning, a Republican state senator backed by the state Republican party. With no candidate attaining a majority, Kitchens and Branning advanced to a runoff on November 26.

The runoff was hotly contested. Less than one percentage point separated the candidates, and the race was uncallable on election night. Ten days after the election, challenger Branning was declared the winner over Kitchens. With the defeat of Justice Beam in District 2, Branning was the only female justice on the Court by her swearing-in in January.

District 1 contains 22 counties in the middle third of the state, including most of the Jackson metropolitan area.

=== Candidates ===
==== Advanced to runoff ====
- Jenifer Branning, member of the Mississippi State Senate from the 18th district (2016–2025) (Republican)
- Jim Kitchens, incumbent justice

==== Eliminated in the first round ====
- Byron Carter, attorney
- Ceola James, former Mississippi Court of Appeals judge
- Abby Robinson, attorney

=== Endorsements ===
Jenifer Branning

State officials

- Tate Reeves, 65th Governor (2020–present) (Republican)
- Delbert Hosemann, 33rd Lieutenant Governor (2020–present) and 35th Secretary of State (2008–2020) (Republican)

Political party

- Mississippi Republican Party
Jim Kitchens

U.S. representative

- Bennie Thompson, Mississippi's 3rd (1993–present) (Democratic)

State official

- Brandon Presley, former member of the Mississippi Public Service Commission (2008–2024) and 2023 gubernatorial nominee (Democratic)

Organization

- Southern Poverty Law Center Action Fund

=== Results ===
District 1 Position 3 election
Candidate	Votes	%
Jenifer Branning	147,892	41.34
Jim Kitchens (incumbent)	127,266	35.58
Ceola James	38,345	10.72
Byron Carter	25,390	7.10
Abby Robinson	18,824	5.26
Total votes	357,717	100.00
Runoff election
Jenifer Branning	64,087	50.55
Jim Kitchens (incumbent)	62,685	49.45
Total votes	126,772	100.00

== District 2 Position 2 ==
District 2 Position 2 election
- November 5, 2024
Nominee	David Sullivan	Dawn H. Beam
Popular vote	206,216	171,625
Percentage	54.58%	45.42%
- Sullivan: 50–60% 60–70% 70–80% 80–90% Beam: 50–60% 60–70% 70–80% 90–100%
Justice before election
Dawn H. Beam
Elected Justice
David Sullivan

Dawn H. Beam, who had served since her appointment in December 2015 and elected to a full term in November 2016, lost re-election to attorney David Sullivan, the municipal judge of D'Iberville in an upset. Sullivan was described as a "stealth candidate" by the Sun Herald.

District 2 contains 26 counties in the southern third of the state, including all of the Gulfport–Biloxi and Hattiesburg metropolitan areas.

=== Candidates ===
- Dawn H. Beam, incumbent justice
- David Sullivan, D'Iberville municipal judge

=== Endorsements ===
Dawn H. Beam

Political party

- Mississippi Republican Party

=== Results ===
District 2 Position 2 election
Candidate	Votes	%
David Sullivan	206,216	54.58
Dawn H. Beam (incumbent)	171,625	45.42
Total votes	377,841	100.00

== District 3 Position 1 ==
District 3 Position 1 election
- November 5, 2024
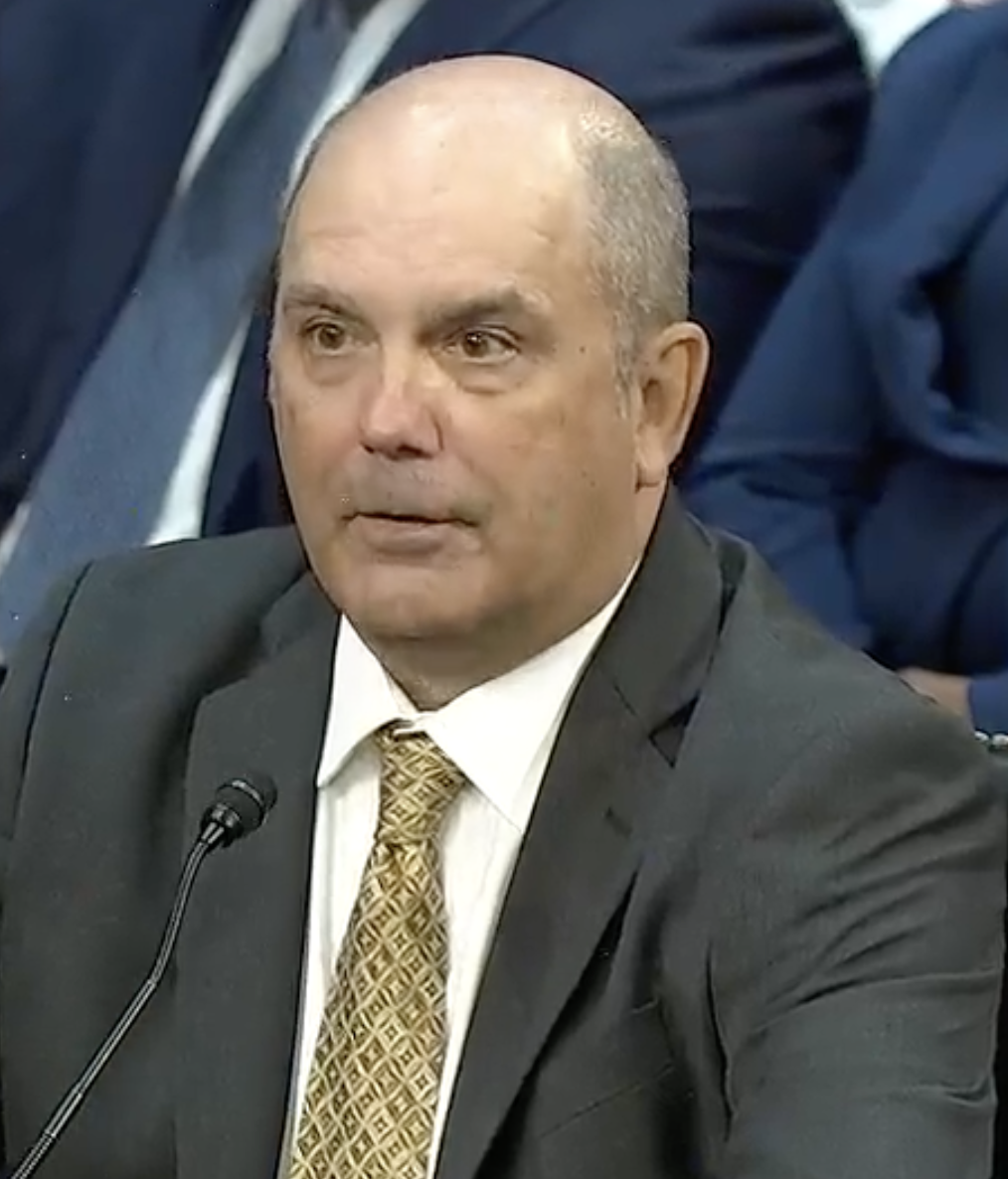
Nominee	Robert P. Chamberlin
Popular vote	341,895
Percentage	100.00%
Justice before election
Robert P. Chamberlin
Elected Justice
Robert P. Chamberlin

Robert P. Chamberlin, who had served since his election in 2016, was re-elected to his post unopposed. He would not serve a full second term, as he was appointed a judge on the United States District Court for the Northern District of Mississippi in December 2025 along with Maxwell.

District 3 contains 34 counties in the northern third of the state, including Mississippi's portion of the Memphis metropolitan area.

=== Candidate ===
- Robert P. Chamberlin, incumbent justice

=== Results ===
District 3 Position 2 election
Candidate	Votes	%
Robert P. Chamberlin (incumbent)	341,895	100.00
Total votes	341,895	100.00

== District 3 Position 2 ==
District 3 Position 2 election
- November 5, 2024
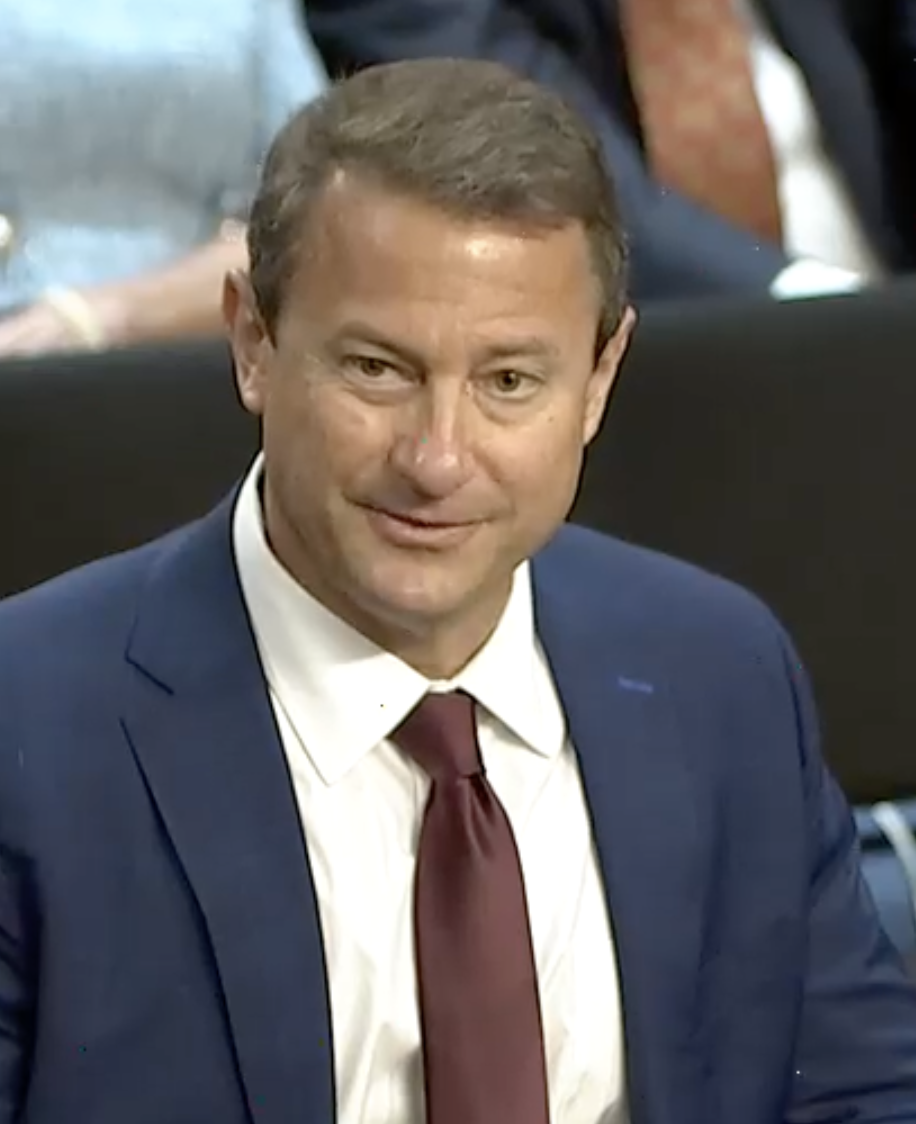
Nominee	Jimmy Maxwell
Popular vote	339,411
Percentage	100.00%
Justice before election
Jimmy Maxwell
Elected Justice
Jimmy Maxwell

Jimmy Maxwell, who had served since his appointment in January 2016 and elected to a full term in November 2016, was re-elected to his post unopposed. He would not serve a full second term, as he was appointed a judge on the United States District Court for the Northern District of Mississippi in December 2025 along with Chamberlin.

District 3 contains 34 counties in the northern third of the state, including Mississippi's portion of the Memphis metropolitan area.

=== Candidate ===
- Jimmy Maxwell, incumbent justice

=== Results ===
District 3 Position 2 election
Candidate	Votes	%
Jimmy Maxwell (incumbent)	339,411	100.00
Total votes	339,411	100.00
