= Dawn H. Beam =

American judge (born 1964)

Dawn Beam

Associate Justice of the Supreme Court of Mississippi
- In office January 1, 2016 – January 6, 2025
- Appointed by: Phil Bryant
- Preceded by: Randy G. Pierce
- Succeeded by: David Sullivan

Personal details
- Born: May 15, 1964 (age 62) Marks, Mississippi, U.S.
- Spouse: Stephen Beam
- Children: 5
- Education: University of Mississippi (BA, JD)

Dawn Henderson Beam (born May 15, 1964) is a former associate justice of the Supreme Court of Mississippi, she served on the court from 2016 to 2025.

== Biography ==
Dawn Beam was born May 15, 1964, in Marks, Mississippi. She earned a Bachelor of Arts in business from the University of Mississippi and a Juris Doctor degree from the University of Mississippi School of Law. She was admitted to the Mississippi Bar in 1989.

=== State court service ===
Previously, Beam was a judge for the 10th Chancery District in Mississippi. She was re-elected on November 4, 2014, for a term that began in 2015 and would have expired in 2018.

=== Supreme Court of Mississippi ===
On December 28, 2015, Governor Phil Bryant appointed Beam to fill the remaining 10-month term of Justice Randy G. Pierce, who resigned on February 1, 2016.

== Advocacy ==
In her early career, she worked extensively in child support enforcement. Her work as a chancellor and as a county prosecutor included protection of abused and neglected children. After her appointment to the Supreme Court, she continued work for the protection of children as co-chair of the Commission on Children's Justice and ReNewMS. She spearheaded efforts to organize Rescue 100 programs to train more foster parents.

== Personal ==
Beam makes her home in Sumrall. She is a member of Sumrall United Methodist Church in Lamar County. She is married to Dr. Stephen Beam. They have five children.

As of 2016, her sister is serving a prison sentence for multiple federal counts of fraud, mail fraud and money laundering after admitting to swindling veterans and the elderly out of more than $2 million.

Currently, Dawn Beam is retired Supreme Court Justice Judge and has re-opened her law firm, Beam law Firm, in her home town of Sumrall, MS.

Legal offices
Preceded by Randy G. Pierce	Associate Justice of the Supreme Court of Mississippi; 2016–2025	Succeeded by David Sullivan
