= James W. Smith Jr. =

American judge

Jim Smith

Chief Justice of the Mississippi Supreme Court
- In office April 1, 2004 – January 5, 2009
- Preceded by: Edwin L. Pittman
- Succeeded by: Bill Waller Jr.

Justice of the Mississippi Supreme Court
- In office January 1993 – January 5, 2009
- Succeeded by: James W. Kitchens

Personal details
- Born: James Wilbur Smith Jr. October 28, 1943 (age 82) Louisville, Mississippi, U.S.
- Spouse: Kathy
- Education: University of Southern Mississippi; Mississippi College

Military service
- Allegiance: United States
- Branch/service: United States Army
- Years of service: 1966–1969

James Wilbur Smith Jr. (born October 28, 1943) is an American judge who joined the Supreme Court of Mississippi in January 1993 and served as chief justice from March 2004 until 2008.

Prior to running for a seat on the state supreme court, Smith had worked on the Mississippi Youth Court, and chaired the state Council of Youth Court Judges from 1991 to 1992.
