= James D. Maxwell II =

American judge (born 1975)

Jimmy Maxwell
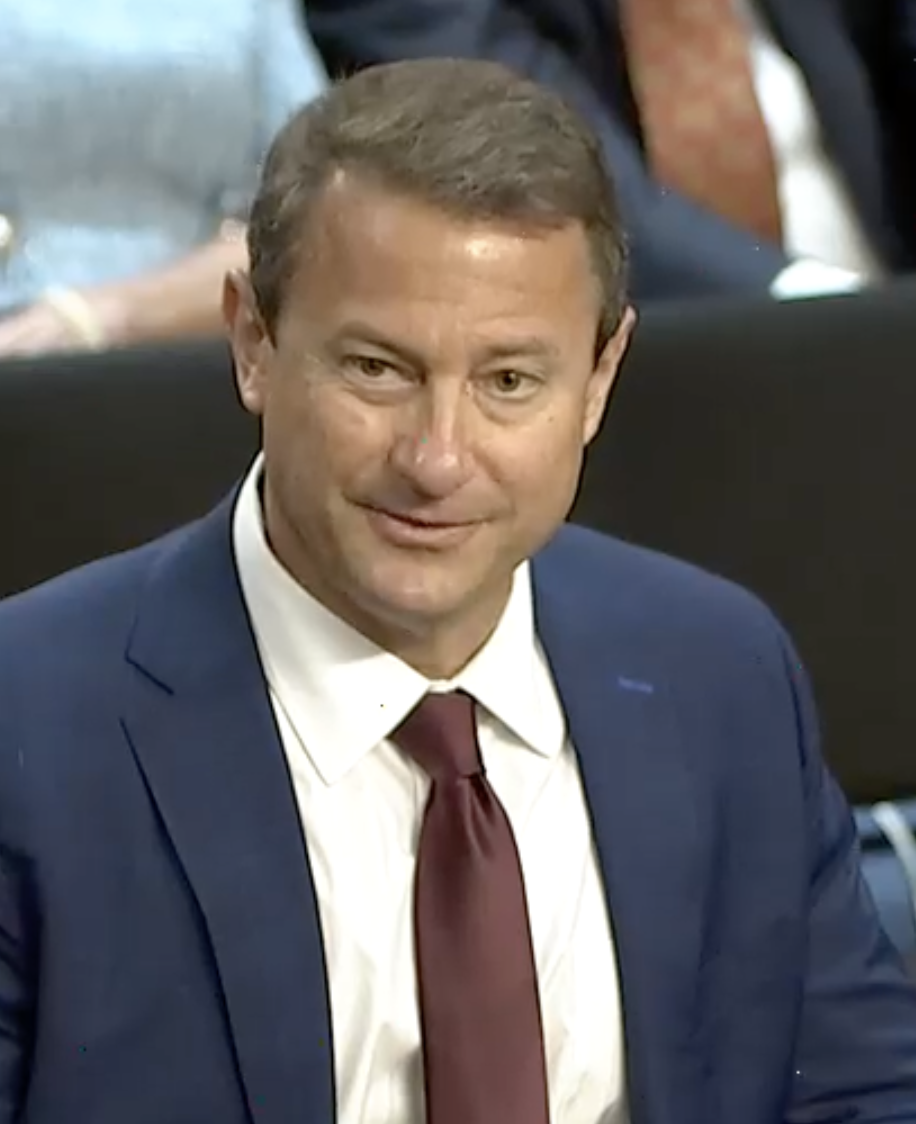

Judge of the United States District Court for the Northern District of Mississippi
- Incumbent
- Assumed office December 18, 2025
- Appointed by: Donald Trump
- Preceded by: Michael P. Mills

Associate Justice of the Mississippi Supreme Court
- In office January 1, 2016 – December 18, 2025
- Appointed by: Phil Bryant
- Preceded by: David A. Chandler
- Succeeded by: Amanda Jones Tollison

Personal details
- Born: James Donald Maxwell II; May 4, 1975 (age 51) Metairie, Louisiana, U.S.
- Education: University of Mississippi (BBA, JD)

James Donald "Jimmy" Maxwell II (born May 4, 1975) is a United States district judge of the United States District Court for the Northern District of Mississippi. He previously served as an associate justice of the Supreme Court of Mississippi.

== Early life, education and career ==
Maxwell was born on May 4, 1975, in Metairie, Louisiana. He received a Bachelor of Business Administration from the University of Mississippi. He attended Mississippi College School of Law for his first year of law school, before completing his final two years and receiving a Juris Doctor from the University of Mississippi School of Law. He practiced civil law in Jackson in the firm of Daniel Coker Horton & Bell before returning to Oxford to serve as an Assistant United States Attorney for the Northern District of Mississippi in 2002.

=== State judicial service in Mississippi ===
On February 2, 2009, Governor Haley Barbour appointed Maxwell to the Mississippi Court of Appeals. He was then elected in 2010 and re-elected in 2014.

On December 23, 2015, Governor Phil Bryant announced Maxwell's elevation to the State Supreme Court.

In 2023, Maxwell wrote the 8-0 majority opinion of Saunders, et al. v. Mississippi concerning the establishment of the Capital Complex Improvement District (CCID); an inferior court created by HB 1020 which would allow the Chief Justice of the Mississippi Supreme Court to appoint four 'temporary special circuit judges' for a period of 42 months to assist with potential crime increases in the Jackson metro area. In his opinion Maxwell sided against the law stating that, while the Legislature had the authority to create separate inferior courts such as the CCID under Article I, Section II of the Mississippi Constitution, the appointment of judges by the Chief Justice violated state constitutional provisions that circuit-court judges be elected for a four year term. The appointment of judges to inferior courts were determined permissible only under 'exigent circumstances' such as 'emergenc[ies] or overcrowded dockets' as stated by the Mississippi Code Section 9-1-105(2). These judges were permitted to be only temporary, needing to have been appointed in collaboration with a majority of the State's Supreme Court Justices and to be 'tailored to address specific emergencies or docket crises', in contrast, the judges to be appointed by HB 1020 - despite being referred to as 'temporary special circuit judges' - were deemed to have "nothing expressly tethering them to a specific judicial need or exigency" and thus did not have the statutory support for their appointment.

In 2025, Maxwell wrote the 8-1 majority opinion of in re the petition of S.M.-B., holding that a 16-year old transgender boy could not legally change his name to better fit his gender identity. Despite both of the teenager's parents consenting to the name change, Maxwell stated that according to Mississippi law and past precedent such as the 1957 Mississippi State Supreme Court decision Marshall v. Marshall, any name change must be "clearly in the best interest of the child". While such a reasoning was not expressly stated by the Chancellor in denying the name change, the court determined that similar Mississippi restrictions on the activities of minors were based on the common law reasoning that minors lacked the proper maturity to partake in the associated activity, most relevantly the restrictions of any medications or surgical procedures to assist in gender transition. As such, given the invocation of such common law restrictions regarding a minors gender transition, the court concluded that the youth lacked the maturity for a decision with "serious or long-lasting ramifications" to be in their best interest, precluding them from such a name change.

=== Federal judicial service ===
On August 12, 2025, President Donald Trump announced his intention to nominate Maxwell to the United States District Court for the Northern District of Mississippi. On September 3, 2025, Maxwell testified before the U.S. Senate Judiciary Committee. On November 20, 2025, the Senate Judiciary Committee voted to send his nomination to the full U.S. Senate by a party line 12–10 vote. On December 9, 2025, the U.S. Senate invoked cloture on his nomination by a 49–46 vote. Later that same day, his nomination was confirmed by a 51–46 vote. Maxwell received his judicial commission on December 18, 2025.

== Awards and recognition ==
Maxwell is a past president of the Young Lawyers Division of the Mississippi Bar Association, the Lafayette County Bar Association, and Tri-County Young Lawyers. He has also served on the Board of Bar Commissioners, the Mississippi Bar Foundation, the Diversity in the Law Committee, and the Board of Directors of the Mississippi Prosecutors Association. He is a graduate of Mississippi Economic Council's Leadership Mississippi program and in 2007 was named "Top 40 Under 40" by the Mississippi Business Journal.

== Personal life ==
Maxwell is married to his wife Mindy and they have two children. They are members of First Baptist Church of Oxford and reside in Oxford.

Legal offices
Preceded by David A. Chandler	Associate Justice of the Mississippi Supreme Court; 2016–2025	Succeeded by Amanda Jones Tollison
Preceded by Michael P. Mills	Judge of the United States District Court for the Northern District of Mississippi; 2025–present	Incumbent
