= Amanda Jones Tollison =

American judge

Amanda Tollison

Associate Justice of the Mississippi Supreme Court
- Incumbent
- Assumed office September 1, 2026
- Appointed by: Tate Reeves
- Preceded by: James D. Maxwell II

Personal details
- Spouse: Gray Tollison
- Education: Mississippi State University (BA); University of Mississippi (JD)

Amanda Jones Tollison is an American lawyer who was appointed to serve as an associate justice of the Supreme Court of Mississippi. Governor Tate Reeves appointed her to the court's Northern District, Place 2 seat on August 17, 2026. Her term began on September 1.

== Early life and education ==
Tollison is a native of Amite County, Mississippi. She earned a Bachelor of Arts in political science, summa cum laude, from Mississippi State University in 1992 and a Juris Doctor, cum laude, from the University of Mississippi School of Law in 1996.

== Legal career ==
Tollison was admitted to the Mississippi Bar in 1996. Earlier in her career, she practiced at Bradley Arant Rose & White and Phelps Dunbar, working in commercial and product-liability litigation and white-collar criminal defense. From 2008 to 2012, she served as legal counsel to Governor Haley Barbour, advising him on legal, legislative and policy matters that included judicial appointments, elections, budgets and disaster recovery.

Tollison joined Butler Snow in 2012 and became a partner in the firm's Oxford office. Her practice included administrative and election law, regulatory matters, and governmental and appellate litigation.

She was president of the Young Lawyers Division of the Mississippi Bar in 2005-2006. In that role, she led its Disaster Legal Assistance Program following Hurricane Katrina. She later served as president of the Mississippi Bar in 2019-2020.

== Mississippi Supreme Court ==
Reeves appointed Tollison to the Supreme Court's Northern District 3, Place 2 seat, succeeding James D. Maxwell II, who left the state court after his confirmation as a judge of the United States District Court for the Northern District of Mississippi. Tollison took office on September 1, 2026 and will serve until the seat is filled in a special election.

Tollison is the third woman currently serving on the nine-member court, the highest number in the court's history.

== Personal life ==
Tollison is married to Gray Tollison, a Mississippi circuit judge and former member of the Mississippi State Senate

Legal offices
Preceded by James D. Maxwell II	Associate Justice of the Mississippi Supreme Court; 2026–present	Incumbent
