= James W. Kitchens =

American judge (born 1943)

Jim Kitchens
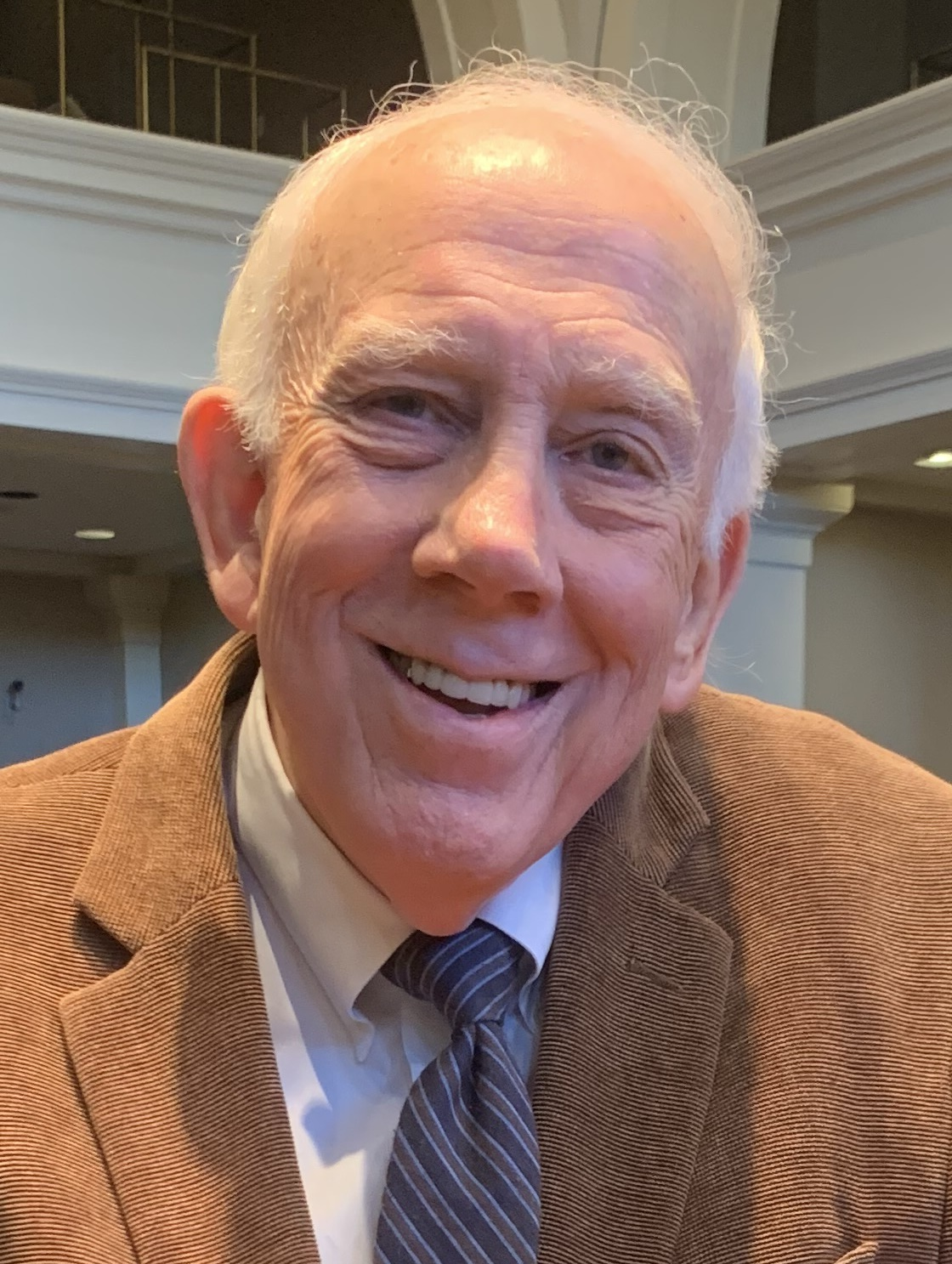
- Kitchens in 2024

Justice of the Mississippi Supreme Court
- In office January 5, 2009 – January 6, 2025
- Preceded by: James W. Smith Jr.
- Succeeded by: Jenifer Branning

Personal details
- Born: April 29, 1943 (age 83) Crystal Springs, Mississippi, U.S.
- Children: 5
- Education: University of Southern Mississippi (BS); University of Mississippi (JD)

James W. Kitchens (born April 29, 1943) is an American jurist who served as a justice of the Supreme Court of Mississippi for the Central District from 2009 to 2025. He served as one of two presiding justices, from 2017 to 2025. A graduate of the University of Southern Mississippi and the University of Mississippi School of Law, Kitchens was elected the district attorney for Mississippi's 14th Judicial District three times from 1971 to 1982, representing Copiah, Lincoln, Pike, and Walthall counties. During his tenure as district attorney, he survived an assassination attempt that resulted in wounds to his hand and leg.

Returning to private practice, Kitchens has worked on several high-profile cases, including serving as counsel in the 2000 Robert Johnson estate case and as a court-appointed attorney for Byron De La Beckwith in 1994. He won election to the Supreme Court in 2008 in an upset victory over incumbent Chief Justice James W. Smith Jr. and was re-elected in 2016. Known for his moderate judicial philosophy, Kitchens has been characterized by legal observers as a centrist jurist. His notable dissenting opinions have addressed issues of judicial authority and prosecutorial discretion.

Kitchens ran for a third term on the Mississippi Supreme Court in 2024, in which he lost in a runoff election.

== Early life and education ==
Kitchens was born on April 29, 1943, in Crystal Springs, Mississippi. His parents were Edith F. Kitchens and Lloyd W. Kitchens, an alderman and eventual mayor of Crystal Springs. Kitchens graduated from Crystal Springs High School in 1961. He subsequently earned a Bachelor of Science degree from the University of Southern Mississippi in 1964, followed by a Juris Doctor from the University of Mississippi School of Law in 1967. Upon completion of his legal studies, he returned to Crystal Springs to practice law.

In 1967, Kitchens unsuccessfully challenged Harold Fortenberry in an election for the Mississippi House of Representatives seat representing Copiah and Lawrence counties.

== Legal career ==
Kitchens has gained admission to the bar in both Mississippi and the District of Columbia. He has been admitted to practice before the United States District Courts for the Northern and Southern Districts of Mississippi, the United States 5th Circuit Court of Appeals and the United States Supreme Court.

In 1971, Kitchens was elected district attorney for Mississippi's 14th judicial district, comprising the counties of Copiah, Lincoln, Pike and Walthall. He received 15,304 votes while contenders Robert S. Reeves and Donald Patterson got 12,012 and 10,253 votes respectively. He won reelection in 1975 and 1979. During his tenure as district attorney, he survived an assassination attempt that resulted in wounds to his hand and leg. He resigned during his third term in 1981 because of financial difficulties and returned to private practice for both criminal and civil cases. He initially did general practice before specializing in civil and criminal trial practice.

In 1982, he joined the defense team for Wayne Williams upon invitation from Alvin M. Binder, an old friend of Kitchens. In 1994, he was a court-appointed attorney for Byron De La Beckwith.

In 2000, Kitchens served as counsel for Claud Johnson in a highly publicized Mississippi Supreme Court case regarding the estate of Johnson's father, blues musician Robert Johnson. Kitchens won the case for Johnson, securing his inheritance rights. That same year, he was appointed chair of the Public Defender Task Force, a body established to evaluate and propose reforms to Mississippi's public defender systems.

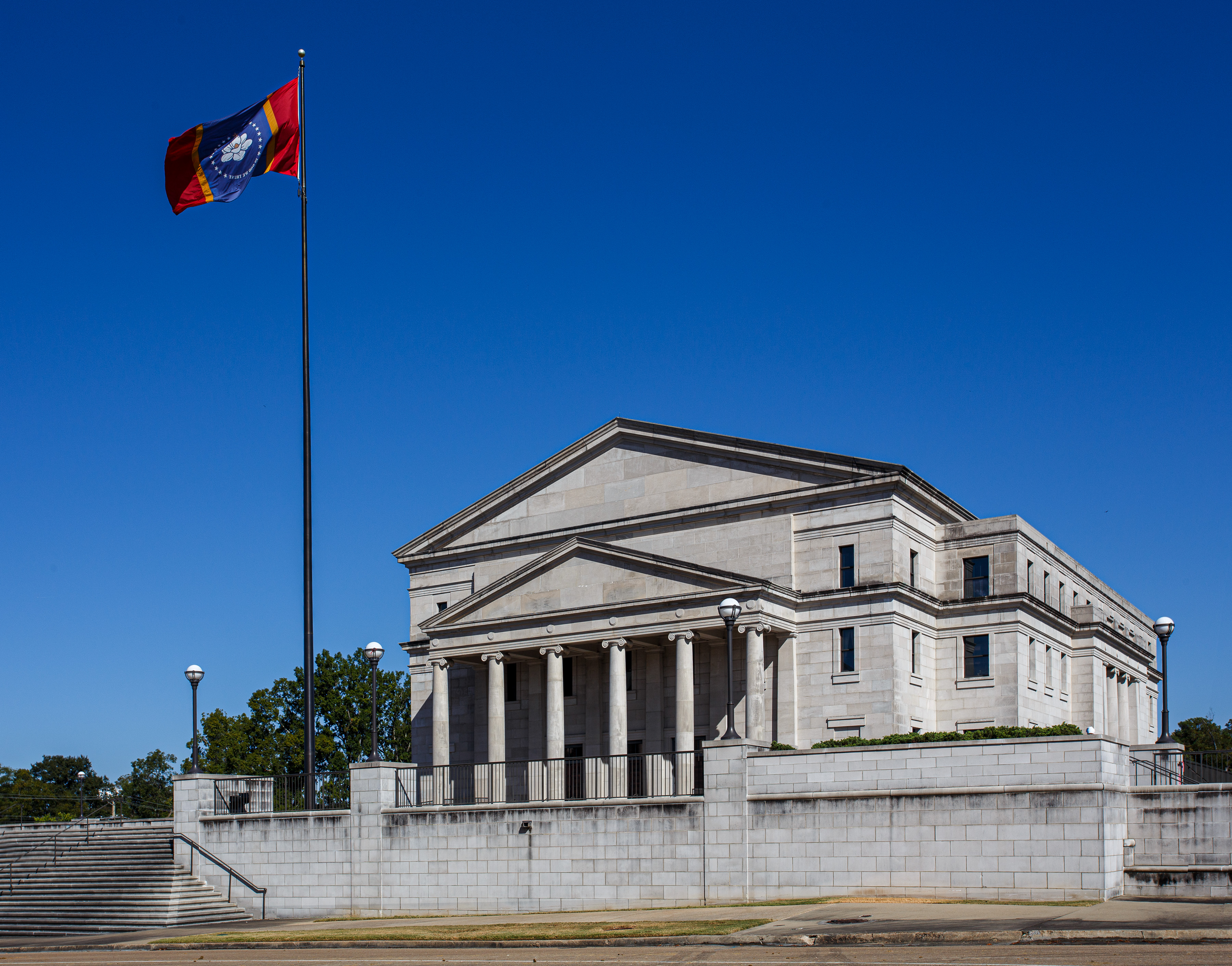
The Mississippi Supreme Court building

=== Mississippi Supreme Court ===
==== 2008 election ====
In 2008, Kitchens sought election to the Central District seat on the Supreme Court of Mississippi, challenging two-term incumbent Chief Justice James W. Smith and former Chancery Judge Ceola James. He was encouraged to run by friends to bring diversity in opinion to the court.

During the campaign, he outraised both Smith and James. His campaign emphasized judicial reform and integrity amid fallout from the Richard Scruggs bribery scandal, while Chief Justice Smith focused his campaign on judicial experience and reducing the Supreme Court's case backlog. The Mississippi chapter of the National Federation of Independent Business endorsed against Kitchens.

In an upset, Kitchens won with 53.4% of the vote, defeating Smith and James. Two other incumbent justices, alongside Smith, lost reelection, an outcome that political analysts attributed to public reaction against perceived corruption in the state's judicial system. Kitchens took the oath of office on January 5, 2009, and had an investiture ceremony on January 17, 2009, in Hazelhurst.

==== 2016 election ====
Election results by precinct for the 2016 supreme court election Griffis: 50–60% 60–70% 70–80% Tie: 50% Kitchens: 50–60% 60–70% 70–80% 80–90%

In 2016, Kitchens faced Mississippi Court of Appeals Judge Kenny Griffis in his bid for reelection. Griffis campaigned on modernizing the court system, while Kitchens emphasized his judicial experience and "folksy" values. The race drew significant political attention, with Governor Phil Bryant, Lieutenant Governor Tate Reeves, and other top Republicans endorsing Griffis, while Kitchens positioned himself as a moderate jurist. Kitchens received campaign donations from prominent Democrats like William Winter, Ronnie Musgrove, Mike Moore, and Dick Molpus. Griffis received contributions from Phil Bryant, Haley Barbour, Joe Nosef, and Mike Chaney. At over $1 million, it was the most expensive race in the state.

Despite the candidates' mutual expressions of respect, the campaign was marked by negative advertising from independent political action committees targeting Kitchens. Kitchens secured reelection with 53.5% of the vote. He was sworn into office on January 3, 2017.

==== 2024 election ====
In 2024, Kitchens announced his candidacy for a third term on the Supreme Court. He cited his mother, a piano teacher who retired at 99, for inspiration as why he ran again. His opponent, Republican State Senator Jenifer Branning, received support from the Mississippi GOP, while Kitchens received endorsements from prominent Democrats and the Southern Poverty Law Center. Three other candidates, Ceola James, Byron Carter, and Abby Robinson, also ran for the seat.

The race attracted significant attention due to Kitchens' moderate judicial philosophy and his position as potential successor to Chief Justice Mike Randolph. Branning campaigned as a "constitutional conservative," emphasizing her traditional values. Kitchens focused on his judicial experience and impartial approach during appearances at venues such as the Neshoba County Fair. Campaign finance reports indicated Kitchens received substantial support from trial attorneys statewide, while Branning's funding derived from interest groups, trade associations, and a self-provided loan of $250,000. Branning raised over $666,000 compared to Kitchens who raised over $288,000.

In the general election, Branning received 41% of the vote to Kitchens 35%, necessitating a runoff election scheduled for November 26 because neither reached a majority. The contested seat, which encompasses portions of the Mississippi Delta and Jackson metropolitan area, is considered to favor Democratic candidates. The Associated Press declared on December 6, 2024, that Branning unseated Kitchens.

=== Tenure ===
Kitchens served as a Presiding Justice for the Mississippi Supreme Court starting in late 2017. As Presiding Justice, he handled administrative duties and made recommendations to other justices as part of the Court's executive committee. Legal observers characterized his judicial philosophy as moderate, describing him as a "middle-of-the-road centrist" and "mild Democrat."

His dissenting opinions frequently addressed issues of judicial authority and prosecutorial discretion. Notable dissents of his include opposition to the establishment of a specialized court in Hinds County and the decision that invalidated Mississippi's ballot initiative process.

== Political opinions ==
Kitchens opined support for a more well-organized and adequately funded state public defender system for Mississippi. He supports nonpartisan judicial elections.

He has criticized the war on drugs and is a strong supporter of drug courts. He believes further improvements are needed for youth detention centers, particularly regarding mental health.

He supports campaign finance reform, advocating for a "blind system" to avoid bias in judicial opinions.

== Personal life and family ==
In 1968, Kitchens married Mary Tooke Kitchens, a retired public school teacher. They have 5 children. Three of his children are attorneys, who left Kitchen's legal practice to form their own after he joined the Supreme Court.

His wife founded the Mississippi's Toughest Kids Foundation, a nonprofit that runs a camping facility for chronically ill children. Its founding was inspired by one of their children having cancer.

Kitchens lives in Crystal Springs with his wife. He had been a deacon and Sunday School teacher at First Baptist Church of Crystal Springs in South Jackson, Mississippi.

Legal offices
Preceded by James W. Smith Jr.	Justice of the Mississippi Supreme Court; 2009–2025	Succeeded by Jenifer Branning
