= Randy G. Pierce =

American judge

Randy Grant Pierce is a former Associate Justice of the Supreme Court of Mississippi. He is also the author of the novel Pain Unforgiven, as well as Magnolia Mud and a graduate of Jones County Jr. College, the University of Southern Mississippi and Ole Miss Law School.

== Biography ==
=== Early life ===
Randy G. Pierce grew up in Greene County, Mississippi where he currently resides. He graduated from Leakesville High School in 1982. He attended Jones County Junior College in 1984–1985, transferred to the University of Southern Mississippi in the fall of 1985, and received a Bachelor of Science Degree in Accounting in 1987. He then became a Certified Public Accountant before receiving his master's degree in business administration from USM. Later, he attended and graduated from the University of Mississippi School of Law, where he served as President of the Law School Student Body.

=== Career ===
He served as a Chancery Court Judge for the Sixteenth Chancery Court District of Jackson, George and Greene counties. He also served as a member of the Mississippi House of Representatives for District 105, where he served as chairman of the House Education Committee and Appropriations Subcommittee on Public Education.

He is a former Associate Justice of the Mississippi Supreme Court. He retired on February 1, 2016.

Randy co-chairs the Commission on Children's Justice and chairs the Rules Committee on the Legal Profession. Pierce currently is the Director of the University of Mississippi (Ole Miss) School of Law Judicial College.

Pierce is also a novelist. His first novel, Pain Unforgiven, was released in May 2011, and his second novel, Magnolia Mud, was released in April 2014. His 3rd novel, The Peter Bay, was released in March 2016.

He is a member of the Mississippi Bar, Mississippi Society of Certified Public Accountants and the American Institute of Certified Public Accountants. Randy is a regular speaker at continuing education seminars and is an adjunct professor at the University of Southern Mississippi and Mississippi College School of Law.

=== Personal life ===
He is married to Cheryl, and they have four children.

== Bibliography ==
- "Pain Unforgiven" Steer Hollow Publishing. 2011. ISBN 978-0-615-45932-5
