= Jenifer Branning =

American politician and judge (born 1979)

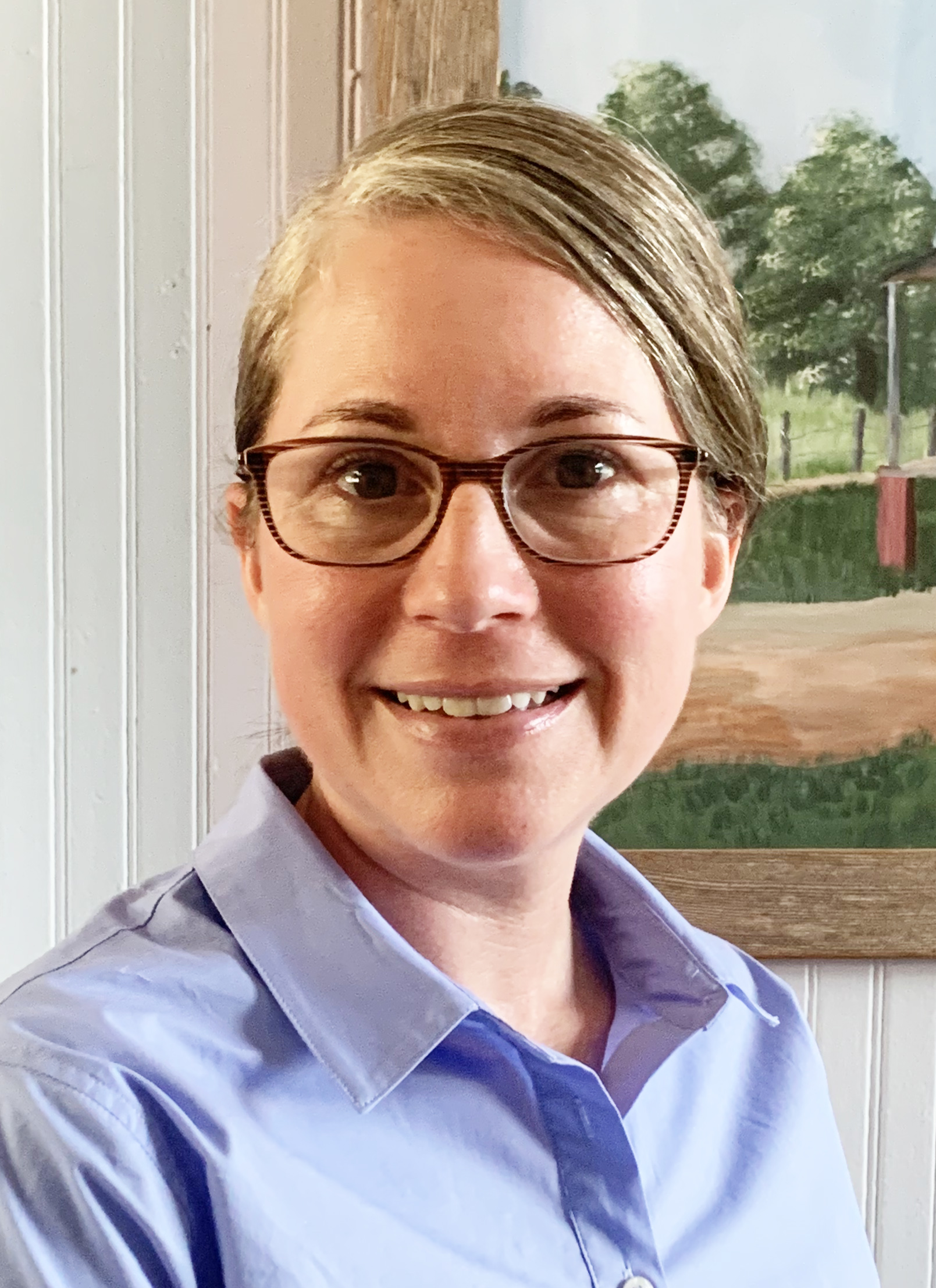

Justice of the Supreme Court of Mississippi
- Incumbent
- Assumed office January 6, 2025
- Preceded by: James W. Kitchens

Member of the Mississippi State Senate from the 18th district
- In office January 5, 2016 – January 6, 2025
- Preceded by: Giles Ward
- Succeeded by: Lane Taylor

Personal details
- Born: Jenifer Ann Burrage; March 13, 1979 (age 47) Neshoba County, Mississippi, U.S.
- Party: Republican
- Spouse: Chancy Branning
- Relatives: Olen Lovell Burrage (grandfather)
- Education: Mississippi State University (BA); Mississippi College (JD)

Jenifer Ann Burrage Branning (born March 13, 1979) is an American lawyer and politician who has served as an associate justice of the Supreme Court of Mississippi since January 2025. She had been a Republican member of the Mississippi State Senate from January 2016 to January 2025, representing the 18th district.

== Early life and education ==
Branning was born on March 13, 1979, in Neshoba County, Mississippi. Her family has deep roots in Neshoba County, with a history spanning five generations. Her grandfather — Olen Lovell Burrage — owned the farm where the bodies of murdered civil rights activists James Chaney, Andrew Goodman, and Michael Schwerner were found buried in a dam in 1964. Burrage, a member of the Ku Klux Klan, was implicated in the cover-up of the murders but was acquitted in 1967 by an all-white jury, using the defence that he was not present at the farm on the night of the murders.

Branning attended Leake Academy in Madden, Mississippi. Branning graduated from Mississippi State University, where she earned a Bachelor of Arts degree. She went on to pursue legal studies and obtained a Juris Doctor degree from the Mississippi College School of Law in 2004.

== Career ==
Branning began her professional career as a lawyer in Philadelphia, Mississippi, where she established herself in legal practice. In 2015, she entered the political arena by running for the Mississippi State Senate seat previously held by Giles Ward, who chose not to seek re-election. Branning won the election and was sworn into office on January 5, 2016. She represents the 18th District, which includes parts of Leake, Neshoba, and Winston counties.

In February 2024, Branning announced her candidacy for a seat on the Mississippi Supreme Court. She advanced to a runoff against incumbent Justice Jim Kitchens. On December 6, 2024, it was announced that Branning won the runoff to unseat Kitchens. Branning was sworn into office on January 6, 2025.

== Personal life ==
Branning is married to Chancy Branning, and they reside in Philadelphia, Mississippi. They are Oneness Pentecostal.

Legal offices
| Preceded by James W. Kitchens | Justice of the Mississippi Supreme Court; 2025–present | Incumbent |
