= David Sullivan (judge) =

American judge

Associate Justice of the Supreme Court of Mississippi
- Incumbent
- Assumed office January 6, 2025
- Preceded by: Dawn H. Beam

Personal details
- Relatives: Michael Sullivan (father)
- Education: Millsaps College (BA); University of Mississippi (JD)

David P. Sullivan is an American lawyer who has served as an associate justice of the Supreme Court of Mississippi since 2025.

== Education ==
Sullivan graduated with a Bachelor of Arts from Millsaps College cum laude in 1990, and the University of Mississippi Law School in 1994.

== Career ==
Sullivan has practiced law for 30 years in Mississippi. From 2019 to 2025, he served as municipal judge for D'Iberville, Mississippi. He also served as a city prosecutor and public defender.

=== Mississippi Supreme Court ===
Sullivan was the opponent to incumbent Justice Dawn H. Beam. On November 5, 2024, Sullivan won election to the court, defeating Beam. Sullivan was sworn into office on January 6, 2025.

== Personal life ==
Sullivan's father, Michael D. Sullivan, also served on the Supreme Court from 1984 to 2000. His grandfather was a Mississippi state senator and Hattiesburg city attorney. Sullivan identifies as a conservative and Christian.

Legal offices
Preceded by Dawn H. Beam	Associate Justice of the Supreme Court of Mississippi; 2025–present	Incumbent
