= Mississippi Supreme Court =

Highest court in the U.S. state of Mississippi

Coordinates: 32°18′19″N 90°10′56″W

- Seal of the Mississippi Judiciary

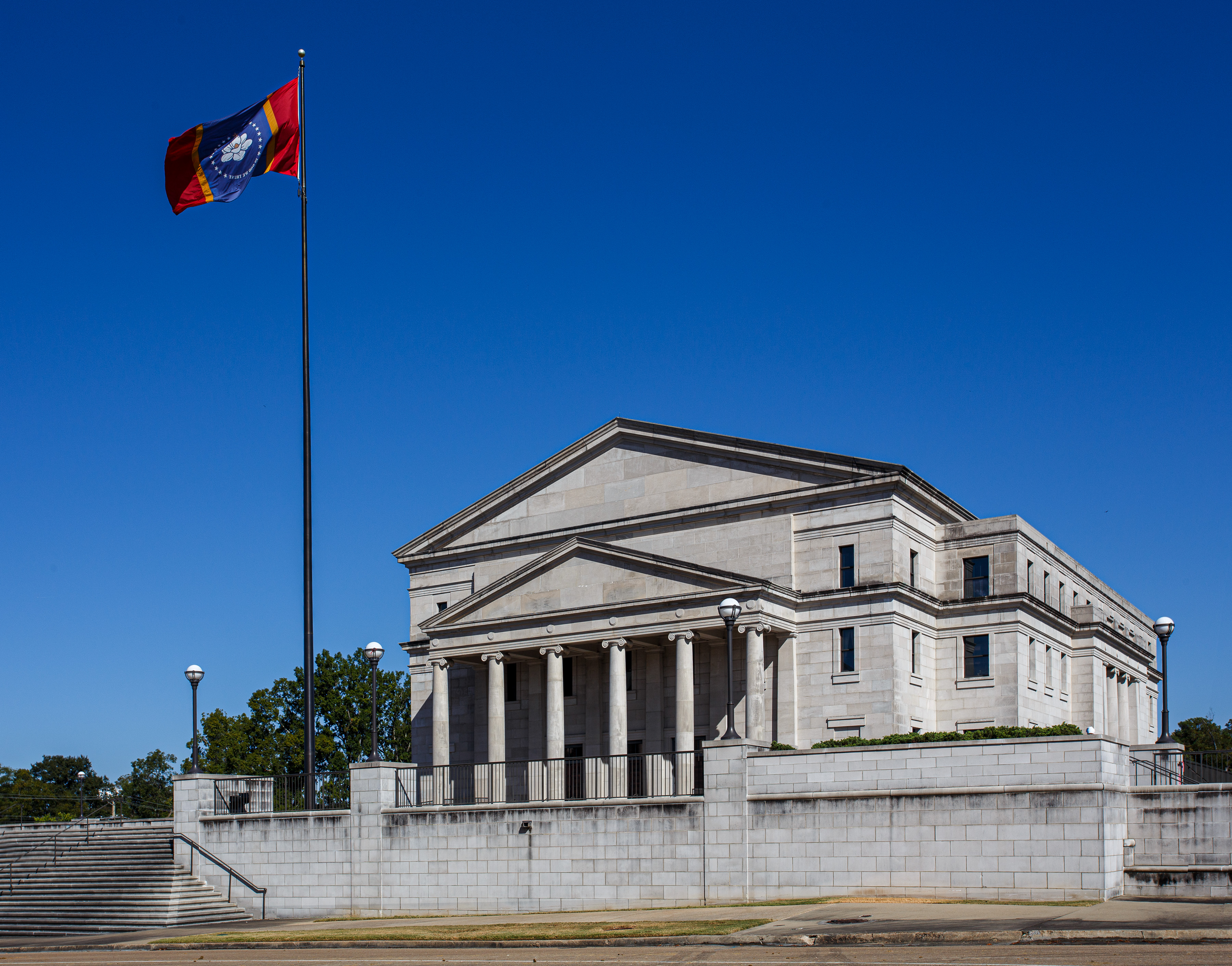
- Interactive map of Mississippi Supreme Court
- Established: 1818
- Jurisdiction: Mississippi, United States
- Location: Jackson, Mississippi
- Composition method: Nonpartisan election
- Authorized by: Mississippi Constitution
- Appeals to: Supreme Court of the United States (matters of federal law only)
- Judge term length: Eight years
- Number of positions: Nine
- Website: Official website

Chief Justice
- Currently: Michael K. Randolph
- Since: January 31, 2019

The Mississippi Supreme Court is the highest court in the state of Mississippi. It was established in 1818 per the terms of the first constitution of the state and was known as the High Court of Errors and Appeals from 1832 to 1869. The court is an appellate court. The court consists of nine justices elected in nonpartisan contests from three districts to serve eight-year terms. The most senior justice serves as the chief justice. It is housed in the Carroll Gartin Justice Building in Jackson, Mississippi, the state capital.

The state constitution grants the Supreme Court broad jurisdiction to review cases that raise questions of law. It only has original jurisdiction over legal cases arising from actions taken by the Mississippi Public Service Commission to alter utility rates and in investigating instances of judicial misconduct. State law gives the Supreme Court direct appellate jurisdiction over cases involving capital punishment, municipal annexation, bond issues, election disputes, judicial disciplinary affairs, certified questions from federal courts, and laws found unconstitutional in lower courts. All appeals of state trial court rulings concerning other matters are initially brought before the Supreme Court, which can then assign them to the Mississippi Court of Appeals at its discretion. The court's members are divided into "divisions" of three justices each, and most cases are heard and ruled upon only by one division. The justices sit en banc to review split-decisions from a division—at the dissenting justice's request—and to hear cases involving capital punishment, utility rates, constitutional matters of first impression, and issues deemed to likely have a significant impact on the public.

== History ==
The Mississippi Territory was established by United States federal law in 1798. Its court system evolved over time to eventually include a supreme court. Mississippi became a U.S. state in 1817, and its judiciary was established in the state's constitution. Under its first constitutional construction, the Supreme Court was composed of judges to be elected by the Mississippi Legislature. The judges spent most of their time presiding over state superior courts, but would convene together twice a year in Natchez to consider appeals from the superior courts. The legislature appointed the first Supreme Court on January 21, 1818. The state's constitution of 1832 provided for the court, renamed the High Court of Errors and Appeals, to have three popularly-elected judges serving six-year terms. In 1839, three constituencies, known as the northern, central, and southern districts, were created for the justices. They changed little over the ensuing decades.

During the Antebellum era, the court's docket was dominated by cases involving land, banks, bonds, railroads, and slavery. In 1836, the constitution was amended to require the court to convene in Jackson. Three years later a state capitol building was completed, and the court moved its sittings to a dedicated courtroom within the structure. The court's workflow was interrupted by the American Civil War. As a result of the conflict, Mississippi came under federal military occupation. In 1866, the court ruled in Ex parte Lewis that the federal Civil Rights Act of 1866 was unconstitutional. With the federal military commander in the state choosing to ignore the decision and Mississippi citizens being placed before military tribunals, in 1867, all justices of the court resigned to protest military rule. The court was then filled by the commander's appointees, who served for another two years. Years later, the court ruled all decisions made by the military appointees legally invalid.

The High Court of Errors and Appeals was abolished by the state's 1869 constitution and replaced with the new Mississippi Supreme Court, with the justices to be appointed by the governor with the advice and consent of the Mississippi Senate. The constitution also required that one justice each was to be a resident of one of the districts, serving staggered nine-year terms. During the Reconstruction era, the court was primarily occupied with cases concerning the aftermath of the Civil War—including war debts—and the regulation of large corporations.

The provisions of the constitution of 1869 regarding the court were largely repeated in the constitution of 1890. The new document prescribed the popular statewide election of the body's clerk. In 1898, the legislature passed a resolution to amend the constitution to provide for the popular election of all judges in the state, including the Supreme Court justices. The amendment was ratified by wide margin in a 1899 statewide referendum but was overturned by the Supreme Court, which ruled that the amendment was substantively equivalent to four separate amendments and thus violated constitutional prohibitions on bundling amendment questions together in referendums. In 1903, the court relocated to chambers in the new Mississippi State Capitol.

In 1914, a series of constitutional amendments were ratified providing for the popular election of six justices to eight-year terms, with the first election taking place in 1916. In 1949, the justices began wearing judicial robes during their sittings. In the first half of the 20th century, the court heard cases concerning cars, Prohibition, and economic relief efforts made in response to the Great Depression. In the late 1940s, several cases brought before the court dealt with civil rights issues.

The court was expanded to nine justices by constitutional amendment in 1952. In the latter half of the twentieth century, the court expanded the rights of criminal defendants and heard more cases concerning personal injury suits. In 1973, the court moved out of the capitol building into the Carroll Gartin Justice Building. An amendment three years later made the Supreme Court responsible for appointing its own clerk. From 1916 to 1980, all Supreme Court elections were effectively decided in the Democratic Party's primary elections, as Mississippi was essentially a one-party state and no Republicans or independents offered challenges in the state's general elections during that time. Judicial primaries were eliminated by law and judicial elections made nonpartisan in 1994.

In the 1970s, courts in Mississippi began moving for the adoption of standard rules of civil procedure. Over the course of the 1980s, the Supreme Court, citing an inherent authority granted by the state constitution and common law to formulate rules for all state courts, adopted several sets of rules, including rules of procedure, rules of evidence, and rules of practice. The adoption of such rules led to tension with legislature, which had up to that point specified most procedural rules in its laws. The legislature considered impeaching justices which had favored the rules adoptions or amending the constitution to limit the court's authority before eventually deciding to withdraw appropriations from the body. In 1991, the tension was resolved when the legislature modified about 2,000 state statutes to adhere to the court's rules. In 1993, the legislature established the Mississippi Court of Appeals to ease the Supreme Court's increasing caseload burden and worsening delays in judgements rendered. The Carroll Gartin Justice Building was rebuilt in 2008 to house both the Supreme Court and the Court of Appeals.

Lenore L. Prather served as the Supreme Court's first female justice from her appointment in 1982 and as its first female chief justice from 1998 until she retired in 2001. Reuben V. Anderson served as the first black justice from 1985 until 1990.

== Function ==
=== Jurisdiction ===
The Mississippi Supreme Court is the court of last resort in the state. The state constitution grants the Supreme Court broad jurisdiction to review cases that raise questions of law. It only has original jurisdiction over legal cases arising from actions taken by the Mississippi Public Service Commission to alter utility rates and in investigating instances of judicial misconduct. Rulings of Chancery, Circuit and County Courts and the Court of Appeals can be appealed to the Supreme Court. When handling cases on appeal, the court may only consider facts raised in the original proceedings in the lower courts. State law gives the Supreme Court direct appellate jurisdiction over cases involving capital punishment, municipal annexation, bond issues, election disputes, judicial disciplinary affairs, certified questions from federal courts, and laws found unconstitutional in lower courts. All appeals of state trial court rulings concerning other matters are initially brought before the Supreme Court, which can then assign them to the Court of Appeals at its discretion. The court can also remand cases from one state court to another. Unlike some of its contemporaries in other states, the Mississippi Supreme Court cannot issue advisory opinions.

=== Sessions and sittings ===
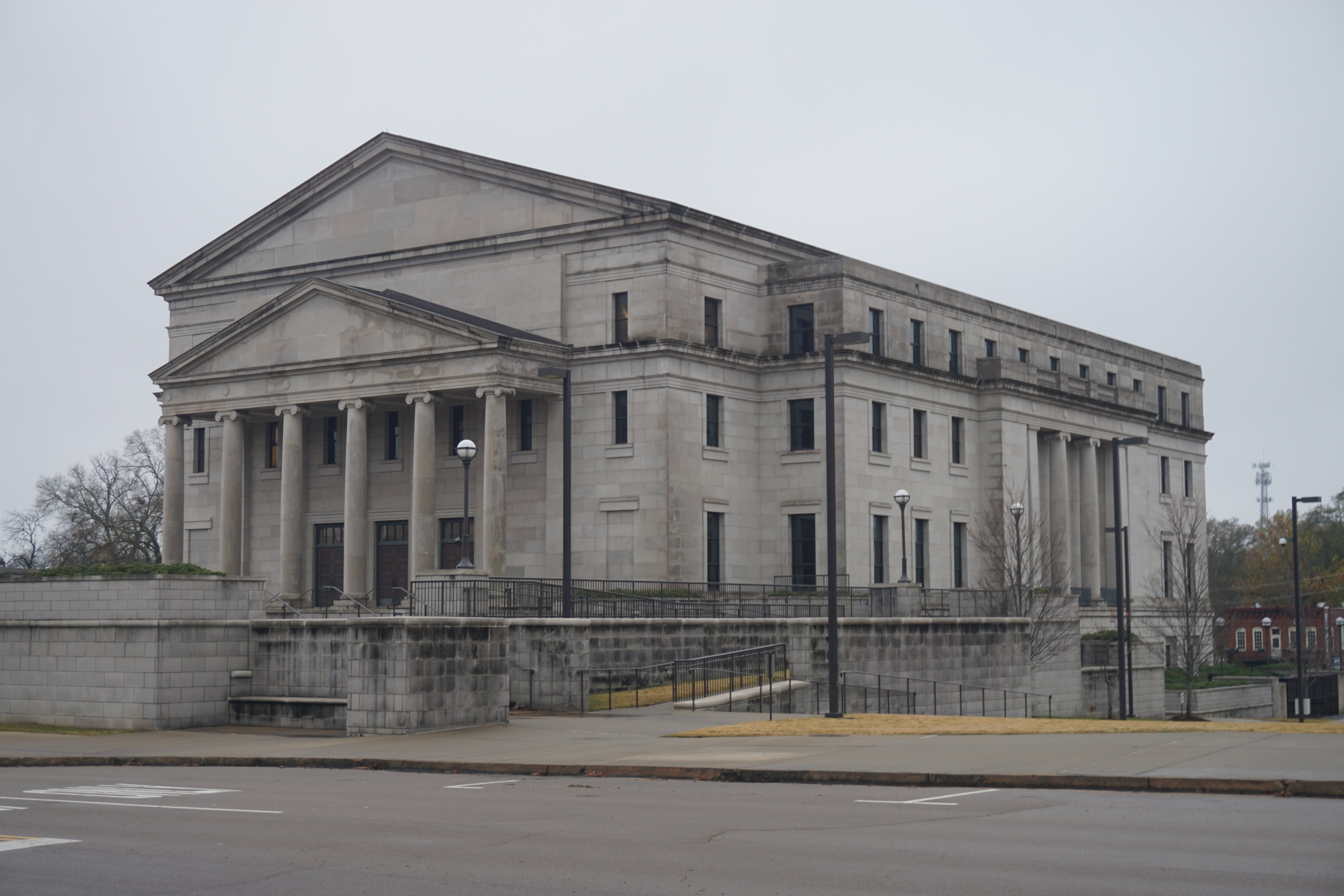
The Carroll Gartin Justice Building in Jackson houses the Supreme Court and its law library.

The state constitution requires the court to hold two sessions per year at the state's seat of government at times fixed by the legislature. The legislature has provided for one term to begin in May and another in September of each year. In practice, the court meets continuously throughout the year. It is housed in the Carroll Gartin Justice Building in Jackson. The court's members are divided into "divisions" of three justices each, and most cases are heard and ruled upon only by one division. The justices sit en banc to review split-decisions from a division—at the dissenting justice's request—and to hear cases involving capital punishment, utility rates, constitutional matters of first impression, and issues deemed to likely have a significant impact on the public. When the courts is sitting en banc, five justices constitute a quorum, while when sitting in a division, two justices constitute a quorum.

=== Decisions ===
Official rulings of the court are determined by a majority vote of the participating justices. In the event of a tie in an appellate case, the ruling of the lower court stands. Historically, the Supreme Court has exercised judicial restraint in its decisions. On questions of state law, the court usually examines the legal propriety of a statute, not its "wisdom". When presented with two possible interpretations of a statute that present different outcomes with regards to its constitutionality, the court has typically favored the interpretation which allows the law to be preserved.

=== Administrative responsibilities ===
The chief justice of the Supreme Court is the chief administrative officer of all state courts. The court is empowered by the state constitution to adopt its own set of rules. It oversees procedure for other state courts. The justices of the Supreme Court appoint their court clerk. The court is also empowered to appoint judges to serve on lower courts in under three circumstances: if an incumbent judge is seriously ill or disabled, if the senior judge of a circuit or chancery court requests an additional judge to assist in handling emergency needs, or if the governor neglects to use their power to fill a vacant judgeship within seven days of the vacancy appearing. State law gives the court supervisory powers over the Mississippi State Library, which is housed in the Gartin Justice Building and serves as the court's law library.

=== Impeachments and removal ===
In the event the governor is impeached by the Mississippi House of Representatives, the chief justice of the Supreme Court or the next most-senior justice—if the former is not available—presides over the impeachment trial in the Mississippi Senate. Justices of the Supreme Court can be impeached by the legislature for "treason, bribery, or any high crime or misdemeanor in office" or can be removed by the governor at the request of two-thirds of the legislature for lesser offenses.

== Court composition ==
=== Elections and seniority ===
The state constitution requires that all candidates for a seat on the Supreme Court be at least 30 years of age, have lived in the state for at least five years, and have practiced law for at least five years. The court is composed of nine justices—six associate justices, two presiding justices, and one chief justice—elected to eight-year terms in nonpartisan, staggered elections. The most-senior-tenured justice serves as the chief justice of the court, with the second and third most-tenured justices serving as the court's presiding judges. The governor is empowered to fill vacancies on the court.

=== Districts ===
The Mississippi Supreme Court of has three electoral districts in the state, commonly known as the northern, central, and southern districts. Three justices are elected from each. The districts also serve as constituencies for the three members of the Mississippi Transportation Commission and the three members of the Mississippi Public Service Commission. Each seat within a district listed on the ballot has a unique number to identify it. They are separated by county lines, as follows:

==== District 1 ====
- Bolivar
- Claiborne
- Copiah
- Hinds
- Holmes
- Humphreys
- Issaquena
- Jefferson
- Kemper
- Lauderdale
- Leake
- Madison
- Neshoba
- Newton
- Noxubee
- Rankin
- Scott
- Sharkey
- Sunflower
- Warren
- Washington
- Yazoo

==== District 2 ====
- Adams
- Amite
- Clarke
- Covington
- Forrest
- Franklin
- George
- Greene
- Hancock
- Harrison
- Jackson
- Jasper
- Jefferson Davis
- Jones
- Lamar
- Lawrence
- Lincoln
- Marion
- Pearl River
- Perry
- Pike
- Simpson
- Smith
- Stone
- Walthall
- Wayne
- Wilkinson

==== District 3 ====
- Alcorn
- Attala
- Benton
- Calhoun
- Carroll
- Chickasaw
- Choctaw
- Clay
- Coahoma
- DeSoto
- Grenada
- Itawamba
- Lafayette
- Lee
- Leflore
- Lowndes
- Marshall
- Monroe
- Montgomery
- Oktibbeha
- Panola
- Pontotoc
- Prentiss
- Quitman
- Tallahatchie
- Tate
- Tippah
- Tishomingo
- Tunica
- Union
- Webster
- Winston
- Yalobusha

== Current justices ==
District	Place	Name	Start	Term ends	Appointer	Law school	Ref
1st Central	1	Kenny Griffis	February 1, 2019	2028	Phil Bryant (R)	Mississippi	
1st Central	2	Leslie D. King, Presiding Justice	February 1, 2011	2028	Haley Barbour (R)	Texas Southern	
1st Central	3	Jenifer Branning	January 6, 2025	2032	—N/a (Note: Took office after being elected.)	MC	
2nd Southern	1	David M. Ishee	September 18, 2017	2028	Phil Bryant (R)	Mississippi	
2nd Southern	2	David Sullivan	January 6, 2025	2032	—N/a	Mississippi	
2nd Southern	3	Michael K. Randolph, Chief Justice	April 23, 2004	2028	Haley Barbour (R)	Mississippi	
3rd Northern	1	Celeste Wilson	August 1, 2026	2028 (special)	Tate Reeves (R)	Memphis	
3rd Northern	2	Amanda Tollison	September 1, 2026	2028 (special)	Tate Reeves (R)	Mississippi	
3rd Northern	3	Josiah D. Coleman, Presiding Justice	January 7, 2013	2028	—N/a	Mississippi; Duke (LLM)	

== Works cited ==
- Alexander, S. Allan; Steffey, Matthew (1994). "Laying the Groundwork for Court Reform - A Report of the Mississippi Bar's Commission on Courts in the 21st Century - Discussion Draft". Mississippi College Law Review. 14 (2): 511–607.
- Challener, Deborah J.; Hoffheimer, Michael H. (2017). "Mixed Cases of Law and Equity in Mississippi Supreme Courts". Mississippi College Law Review. 35 (3): 387–435.
- Christopher, John W. (2005). "Tort Reform by the Mississippi Supreme Court". Mississippi College Law Review. 24 (2): 427–435.
- Mississippi Public Service Commission Annual Report Ending June 30, 2022 (PDF), Mississippi Public Service Commission, 2022
- Morton, Ronald C. (1992). "Rules, Rulemaking, and the Ruled: The Mississippi Supreme Court as Self-Proclaimed Ruler - Duncan v. St. Romain". Mississippi College Law Review. 12 (1): 293–335.
- Rowland, Dunbar, ed. (1904). The Official and Statistical Register of the State of Mississippi. Jackson: Mississippi Department of Archives and History. OCLC 777030828.
- Somerville, Thomas H. (1899). "A Sketch of the Supreme Court of Mississippi". The Green Bag. Vol. XI. pp. 503–515.
- Southwick, Leslie (1998). "Mississippi Supreme Court Elections: A Historical Perspective 1916-1996". Mississippi College Law Review. 18 (1): 115–198.
- Winkle, John W. III (2014). The Mississippi State Constitution (second ed.). Oxford University Press. ISBN 9780199300631.
