= Mississippi's congressional delegations =

Mississippi's congressional districts since 2023

These are tables of congressional delegations from Mississippi to the United States House of Representatives and the United States Senate.

The current dean of the Mississippi delegation is Representative Bennie Thompson (MS-2), having served in the House since 1993.

== United States Senate ==
Current U.S. senators from Mississippi
Mississippi CPVI (2025): R+11	Class I senator	Class II senator
Mississippi CPVI (2025): R+11	Roger Wicker (Senior senator) (Tupelo)	Cindy Hyde-Smith (Junior senator) (Brookhaven)
Party	Republican	Republican
Incumbent since	December 31, 2007	April 2, 2018

Class I senators	Congress	Class II senators
Walter Leake (DR)	15th (1817–1819)	Thomas Hill Williams (DR)
Walter Leake (DR)	16th (1819–1821)	Thomas Hill Williams (DR)
David Holmes (DR)	16th (1819–1821)	Thomas Hill Williams (DR)
David Holmes (DR)	17th (1821–1823)	Thomas Hill Williams (DR)
David Holmes (DR)	18th (1823–1825)	Thomas Hill Williams (DR)
David Holmes (J)	19th (1825–1827)	Thomas Hill Williams (J)
Powhatan Ellis (J)	19th (1825–1827)	Thomas Hill Williams (J)
Thomas Buck Reed (J)	19th (1825–1827)	Thomas Hill Williams (J)
Powhatan Ellis (J)	20th (1827–1829)	Thomas Hill Williams (J)
Powhatan Ellis (J)	21st (1829–1831)	Thomas Buck Reed (J)
Powhatan Ellis (J)	21st (1829–1831)	Robert H. Adams (J)
Powhatan Ellis (J)	21st (1829–1831)	George Poindexter (J)
Powhatan Ellis (J)	22nd (1831–1833)	George Poindexter (NR)
John Black (J)	22nd (1831–1833)	George Poindexter (NR)
John Black (NR)	23rd (1833–1835)	George Poindexter (NR)
John Black (NR)	24th (1835–1837)	Robert J. Walker (J)
John Black (W)	25th (1837–1839)	Robert J. Walker (D)
James F. Trotter (D)	25th (1837–1839)	Robert J. Walker (D)
Thomas Hickman Williams (D)	25th (1837–1839)	Robert J. Walker (D)
John Henderson (W)	26th (1839–1841)	Robert J. Walker (D)
John Henderson (W)	27th (1841–1843)	Robert J. Walker (D)
John Henderson (W)	28th (1843–1845)	Robert J. Walker (D)
Jesse Speight (D)	29th (1845–1847)	Robert J. Walker (D)
Jesse Speight (D)	29th (1845–1847)	Joseph W. Chalmers (D)
Jesse Speight (D)	30th (1847–1849)	Henry S. Foote (D)
Jefferson Davis (D)	30th (1847–1849)	Henry S. Foote (D)
Jefferson Davis (D)	31st (1849–1851)	Henry S. Foote (D)
John J. McRae (D)	32nd (1851–1853)	Henry S. Foote (D)
Stephen Adams (D)	32nd (1851–1853)	Walker Brooke (W)
Stephen Adams (D)	33rd (1853–1855)	Albert G. Brown (D)
Stephen Adams (D)	34th (1855–1857)	Albert G. Brown (D)
Jefferson Davis (D)	35th (1857–1859)	Albert G. Brown (D)
Jefferson Davis (D)	36th (1859–1861)	Albert G. Brown (D)
American Civil War	36th (1859–1861)	American Civil War
American Civil War	37th (1861–1863)	American Civil War
American Civil War	38th (1863–1865)	American Civil War
American Civil War	39th (1865–1867)	American Civil War
American Civil War	40th (1867–1869)	American Civil War
American Civil War	41st (1869–1871)	American Civil War
Adelbert Ames (R)	41st (1869–1871)	Hiram R. Revels (R)
Adelbert Ames (R)	42nd (1871–1873)	James L. Alcorn (R)
Adelbert Ames (R)	43rd (1873–1875)	James L. Alcorn (R)
Henry R. Pease (R)	43rd (1873–1875)	James L. Alcorn (R)
Blanche Bruce (R)	44th (1875–1877)	James L. Alcorn (R)
Blanche Bruce (R)	45th (1877–1879)	Lucius Quintus; Cincinnatus Lamar (D)
Blanche Bruce (R)	46th (1879–1881)	Lucius Quintus; Cincinnatus Lamar (D)
James Z. George (D)	47th (1881–1883)	Lucius Quintus; Cincinnatus Lamar (D)
James Z. George (D)	48th (1883–1885)	Lucius Quintus; Cincinnatus Lamar (D)
James Z. George (D)	49th (1885–1887)	Lucius Quintus; Cincinnatus Lamar (D)
James Z. George (D)	49th (1885–1887)	Edward C. Walthall (D)
James Z. George (D)	50th (1887–1889)	Edward C. Walthall (D)
James Z. George (D)	51st (1889–1891)	Edward C. Walthall (D)
James Z. George (D)	52nd (1891–1893)	Edward C. Walthall (D)
James Z. George (D)	53rd (1893–1895)	Edward C. Walthall (D)
James Z. George (D)	53rd (1893–1895)	Anselm J. McLaurin (D)
James Z. George (D)	54th (1895–1897)	Edward C. Walthall (D)
James Z. George (D)	55th (1897–1899)	Edward C. Walthall (D)
Hernando Money (D)	55th (1897–1899)	William V. Sullivan (D)
Hernando Money (D)	56th (1899–1901)	William V. Sullivan (D)
Hernando Money (D)	57th (1901–1903)	Anselm J. McLaurin (D)
Hernando Money (D)	58th (1903–1905)	Anselm J. McLaurin (D)
Hernando Money (D)	59th (1905–1907)	Anselm J. McLaurin (D)
Hernando Money (D)	60th (1907–1909)	Anselm J. McLaurin (D)
Hernando Money (D)	61st (1909–1911)	Anselm J. McLaurin (D)
Hernando Money (D)	61st (1909–1911)	James Gordon (D)
Hernando Money (D)	61st (1909–1911)	LeRoy Percy (D)
John Sharp Williams (D)	62nd (1911–1913)	LeRoy Percy (D)
John Sharp Williams (D)	63rd (1913–1915)	James K. Vardaman (D)
John Sharp Williams (D)	64th (1915–1917)	James K. Vardaman (D)
John Sharp Williams (D)	65th (1917–1919)	James K. Vardaman (D)
John Sharp Williams (D)	66th (1919–1921)	Pat Harrison (D)
John Sharp Williams (D)	67th (1921–1923)	Pat Harrison (D)
Hubert D. Stephens (D)	68th (1923–1925)	Pat Harrison (D)
Hubert D. Stephens (D)	69th (1925–1927)	Pat Harrison (D)
Hubert D. Stephens (D)	70th (1927–1929)	Pat Harrison (D)
Hubert D. Stephens (D)	71st (1929–1931)	Pat Harrison (D)
Hubert D. Stephens (D)	72nd (1931–1933)	Pat Harrison (D)
Hubert D. Stephens (D)	73rd (1933–1935)	Pat Harrison (D)
Theodore G. Bilbo (D)	74th (1935–1937)	Pat Harrison (D)
Theodore G. Bilbo (D)	75th (1937–1939)	Pat Harrison (D)
Theodore G. Bilbo (D)	76th (1939–1941)	Pat Harrison (D)
Theodore G. Bilbo (D)	77th (1941–1943)	Pat Harrison (D)
Theodore G. Bilbo (D)	77th (1941–1943)	James Eastland (D)
Theodore G. Bilbo (D)	77th (1941–1943)	Wall Doxey (D)
Theodore G. Bilbo (D)	78th (1943–1945)	James Eastland (D)
Theodore G. Bilbo (D)	79th (1945–1947)	James Eastland (D)
Theodore G. Bilbo (D)	80th (1947–1949)	James Eastland (D)
John C. Stennis (D)	80th (1947–1949)	James Eastland (D)
John C. Stennis (D)	81st (1949–1951)	James Eastland (D)
John C. Stennis (D)	82nd (1951–1953)	James Eastland (D)
John C. Stennis (D)	83rd (1953–1955)	James Eastland (D)
John C. Stennis (D)	84th (1955–1957)	James Eastland (D)
John C. Stennis (D)	85th (1957–1959)	James Eastland (D)
John C. Stennis (D)	86th (1959–1961)	James Eastland (D)
John C. Stennis (D)	87th (1961–1963)	James Eastland (D)
John C. Stennis (D)	88th (1963–1965)	James Eastland (D)
John C. Stennis (D)	89th (1965–1967)	James Eastland (D)
John C. Stennis (D)	90th (1967–1969)	James Eastland (D)
John C. Stennis (D)	91st (1969–1971)	James Eastland (D)
John C. Stennis (D)	92nd (1971–1973)	James Eastland (D)
John C. Stennis (D)	93rd (1973–1975)	James Eastland (D)
John C. Stennis (D)	94th (1975–1977)	James Eastland (D)
John C. Stennis (D)	95th (1977–1979)	James Eastland (D)
John C. Stennis (D)	95th (1977–1979)	Thad Cochran (R)
John C. Stennis (D)	96th (1979–1981)	Thad Cochran (R)
John C. Stennis (D)	97th (1981–1983)	Thad Cochran (R)
John C. Stennis (D)	98th (1983–1985)	Thad Cochran (R)
John C. Stennis (D)	99th (1985–1987)	Thad Cochran (R)
John C. Stennis (D)	100th (1987–1989)	Thad Cochran (R)
Trent Lott (R)	101st (1989–1991)	Thad Cochran (R)
Trent Lott (R)	102nd (1991–1993)	Thad Cochran (R)
Trent Lott (R)	103rd (1993–1995)	Thad Cochran (R)
Trent Lott (R)	104th (1995–1997)	Thad Cochran (R)
Trent Lott (R)	105th (1997–1999)	Thad Cochran (R)
Trent Lott (R)	106th (1999–2001)	Thad Cochran (R)
Trent Lott (R)	107th (2001–2003)	Thad Cochran (R)
Trent Lott (R)	108th (2003–2005)	Thad Cochran (R)
Trent Lott (R)	109th (2005–2007)	Thad Cochran (R)
Trent Lott (R)	110th (2007–2009)	Thad Cochran (R)
Roger Wicker (R)	110th (2007–2009)	Thad Cochran (R)
Roger Wicker (R)	111th (2009–2011)	Thad Cochran (R)
Roger Wicker (R)	112th (2011–2013)	Thad Cochran (R)
Roger Wicker (R)	113th (2013–2015)	Thad Cochran (R)
Roger Wicker (R)	114th (2015–2017)	Thad Cochran (R)
Roger Wicker (R)	115th (2017–2019)	Thad Cochran (R)
Roger Wicker (R)	115th (2017–2019)	Cindy Hyde-Smith (R)
Roger Wicker (R)	116th (2019–2021)	Cindy Hyde-Smith (R)
Roger Wicker (R)	117th (2021–2023)	Cindy Hyde-Smith (R)
Roger Wicker (R)	118th (2023–2025)	Cindy Hyde-Smith (R)
Roger Wicker (R)	119th (2025–2027)	Cindy Hyde-Smith (R)
Roger Wicker (R)	120th (2027–2029)	Scott Colom (D)

== U.S. House of Representatives ==
=== Current members ===
List of members, their terms in office, district boundaries, and the district political ratings according to the CPVI. The delegation has 4 members: 3 Republicans and 1 Democrat.

Current U.S. representatives from Mississippi
District	Member (Residence)	Party	Incumbent since	CPVI (2025)	District map
1st	Trent Kelly (Saltillo)	Republican	June 2, 2015	R+18	
2nd	Bennie Thompson (Bolton)	Democratic	April 13, 1993	D+11	
3rd	Michael Guest (Brandon)	Republican	January 3, 2019	R+14	
4th	Mike Ezell (Pascagoula)	Republican	January 3, 2023	R+21	

=== Mississippi Territory ===
On April 7, 1798, the Mississippi Territory was created. Starting in 1801, the Territory sent one non-voting delegate to the U.S. House of Representatives.

Congress	Delegate
7th (1801–1803)	Narsworthy Hunter (DR)
7th (1801–1803)	Thomas M. Green Jr. (DR)
8th (1803–1805)	William Lattimore (DR)
9th (1805–1807)	William Lattimore (DR)
10th (1807–1809)	George Poindexter (DR)
11th (1809–1811)	George Poindexter (DR)
12th (1811–1813)	George Poindexter (DR)
13th (1813–1815)	William Lattimore (DR)
14th (1815–1817)	William Lattimore (DR)

=== State of Mississippi ===
On December 10, 1817, Mississippi was admitted into the Union as a state and sent one Representative to Congress, elected at-large statewide. After the 1830 census, Mississippi had two seats, elected statewide at-large on a general ticket. Starting in 1843, Mississippi's delegation was increased to four seats, still elected at-large statewide on a general ticket. After 1847, those seats were elected by representative districts. After the 1850 census, Mississippi gained a 5th seat. For the 33rd Congress, that fifth seat was elected at-large. Starting with the 34th Congress, the new seat was apportioned as a fifth district.

==== 1817–1847: at-large elections ====
Congress	At-large seat A			
15th (1817–1819)	George Poindexter (DR)			
16th (1819–1821)	Christopher Rankin (DR) (Note: Supported the Jackson faction in the 1824 United States presidential election.)			
17th (1821–1823)	Christopher Rankin (DR)			
18th (1823–1825)	Christopher Rankin (DR)			
19th (1825–1827)	Christopher Rankin (J)			
19th (1825–1827)	William Haile (J)			
20th (1827–1829)	William Haile (J)			
20th (1827–1829)	Thomas Hinds (J)			
21st (1829–1831)	Thomas Hinds (J)			
22nd (1831–1833)	Franklin E. Plummer (J)	At-large seat B		
23rd (1833–1835)	Franklin E. Plummer (J)	Harry Cage (J)		
24th (1835–1837)	J. F. H. Claiborne (J)	David C. Dickson (NR)		
24th (1835–1837)	J. F. H. Claiborne (J)	Samuel J. Gholson (J)		
25th (1837–1839)	J. F. H. Claiborne (D) (Note: Claibourne's and Gholson's elections in 1836 were contested due to election irregularities. The House set aside both contests, and vacated both seats February 5, 1838.)	Samuel J. Gholson (D)		
25th (1837–1839)	Seargent S. Prentiss (W)	Thomas J. Word (W)		
26th (1839–1841)	Jacob Thompson (D)	Albert G. Brown (D)		
27th (1841–1843)	Jacob Thompson (D)	William M. Gwin (D)	At-large seat C	At-large seat D
28th (1843–1845)	Jacob Thompson (D)	William H. Hammett (D)	Robert W. Roberts (D)	Tilghman Tucker (D)
29th (1845–1847)	Jacob Thompson (D)	Stephen Adams (D)	Robert W. Roberts (D)	Jefferson Davis (D)
29th (1845–1847)	Jacob Thompson (D)	Stephen Adams (D)	Robert W. Roberts (D)	Henry T. Ellett (D)

==== 1847–1853: 4 seats ====
Congress	1st district	2nd district	3rd district	4th district
30th (1847–1849)	Jacob Thompson (D)	Winfield S. Featherston (D)	Patrick W. Tompkins (W)	Albert G. Brown (D)
31st (1849–1851)	Jacob Thompson (D)	Winfield S. Featherston (D)	William McWillie (D)	Albert G. Brown (D)
32nd (1851–1853)	Benjamin D. Nabers (U)	John Allen Wilcox (U)	John D. Freeman (U)	Albert G. Brown (D)

==== 1853–1873: 5 seats ====
Congress	1st district	2nd district	3rd district	4th district	At-large
33rd (1853–1855)	Daniel B. Wright (D)	William S. Barry (D)	Otho R. Singleton (D)	Wiley P. Harris (D)	William Barksdale (D)
34th (1855–1857)	Daniel B. Wright (D)	Hendley S. Bennett (D)	William; Barksdale (D) (Note: William Barksdale, Reuben Davis, Otho Robards Singleton and John Jones McRae all resigned on January 12, 1861, upon Mississippi's secession.)	William A. Lake (KN)	5th district
34th (1855–1857)	Daniel B. Wright (D)	Hendley S. Bennett (D)	William; Barksdale (D)	William A. Lake (KN)	John A. Quitman (D)
35th (1857–1859)	Lucius Q. C. Lamar (D)	Reuben; Davis (D)	William; Barksdale (D)	Otho R. Singleton (D)	John A. Quitman (D)
35th (1857–1859)	Lucius Q. C. Lamar (D)	Reuben; Davis (D)	William; Barksdale (D)	Otho R. Singleton (D)	John J. McRae (D)
36th (1859–1861)	Lucius Q. C. Lamar (D)	Reuben; Davis (D)	William; Barksdale (D)	Otho R. Singleton (D)	John J. McRae (D)
36th (1859–1861)	American Civil War				
37–40th (1861–1869)	American Civil War				
41st (1869–1871)	American Civil War				
41st (1869–1871)	George E. Harris (R)	Joseph L. Morphis (R)	Henry W. Barry (R)	George C. McKee (R)	Legrand W. Perce (R)
42nd (1871–1873)	George E. Harris (R)	Joseph L. Morphis (R)	Henry W. Barry (R)	George C. McKee (R)	Legrand W. Perce (R)

==== 1873–1883: 6 seats ====
Congress	1st district	2nd district	3rd district	4th district	5th district	6th district
43rd (1873–1875)	Lucius Q. C. Lamar (D)	Albert R. Howe (R)	Henry W. Barry (R)	Jason Niles (R)	George C. McKee (R)	John R. Lynch (R)
44th (1875–1877)	Lucius Q. C. Lamar (D)	Guilford W. Wells (IR)	Hernando; Money (D)	Otho R. Singleton (D)	Charles E. Hooker (D)	John R. Lynch (R)
45th (1877–1879)	Henry L. Muldrow (D)	Van H. Manning (D)	Hernando; Money (D)	Otho R. Singleton (D)	Charles E. Hooker (D)	James R. Chalmers (D)
46th (1879–1881)	Henry L. Muldrow (D)	Van H. Manning (D)	Hernando; Money (D)	Otho R. Singleton (D)	Charles E. Hooker (D)	James R. Chalmers (D)
47th (1881–1883)	Henry L. Muldrow (D)	Van H. Manning (D)	Hernando; Money (D)	Otho R. Singleton (D)	Charles E. Hooker (D)	James R. Chalmers (D)
47th (1881–1883)	Henry L. Muldrow (D)	Van H. Manning (D)	Hernando; Money (D)	Otho R. Singleton (D)	Charles E. Hooker (D)	John R. Lynch (R)

==== 1883–1903: 7 seats ====
Congress	District						
Congress	1st	2nd	3rd	4th	5th	6th	7th
48th (1883–1885)	Henry L. Muldrow (D)	Van H. Manning (D)	Elza; Jeffords (R)	Hernando; Money (D)	Ethelbert; Barksdale (D)	Henry Smith; Van Eaton (D)	Otho R. Singleton (D)
48th (1883–1885)	Henry L. Muldrow (D)	James R. Chalmers (I)	Elza; Jeffords (R)	Hernando; Money (D)	Ethelbert; Barksdale (D)	Henry Smith; Van Eaton (D)	Otho R. Singleton (D)
49th (1885–1887)	John Mills; Allen (D)	James B. Morgan (D)	Thomas C. Catchings (D)	Frederick G. Barry (D)	Ethelbert; Barksdale (D)	Henry Smith; Van Eaton (D)	Otho R. Singleton (D)
50th (1887–1889)	John Mills; Allen (D)	James B. Morgan (D)	Thomas C. Catchings (D)	Frederick G. Barry (D)	Chapman L. Anderson (D)	T. R. Stockdale (D)	Charles E. Hooker (D)
51st (1889–1891)	John Mills; Allen (D)	James B. Morgan (D)	Thomas C. Catchings (D)	Clarke; Lewis (D)	Chapman L. Anderson (D)	T. R. Stockdale (D)	Charles E. Hooker (D)
52nd (1891–1893)	John Mills; Allen (D)	John C. Kyle (D)	Thomas C. Catchings (D)	Clarke; Lewis (D)	Jo Beeman (D)	T. R. Stockdale (D)	Charles E. Hooker (D)
53rd (1893–1895)	John Mills; Allen (D)	John C. Kyle (D)	Thomas C. Catchings (D)	Hernando; Money (D)	John Sharp; Williams (D)	T. R. Stockdale (D)	Charles E. Hooker (D)
54th (1895–1897)	John Mills; Allen (D)	John C. Kyle (D)	Thomas C. Catchings (D)	Hernando; Money (D)	John Sharp; Williams (D)	Walter Denny (D)	James Spencer (D)
55th (1897–1899)	John Mills; Allen (D)	W. V. Sullivan (D)	Thomas C. Catchings (D)	Andrew F. Fox (D)	John Sharp; Williams (D)	William Love (D)	Patrick Henry (D)
55th (1897–1899)	John Mills; Allen (D)	Thomas Spight (D)	Thomas C. Catchings (D)	Andrew F. Fox (D)	John Sharp; Williams (D)	Frank A. McLain (D)	Patrick Henry (D)
56th (1899–1901)	John Mills; Allen (D)	Thomas Spight (D)	Thomas C. Catchings (D)	Andrew F. Fox (D)	John Sharp; Williams (D)	Frank A. McLain (D)	Patrick Henry (D)
57th (1901–1903)	Ezekiel; Candler (D)	Thomas Spight (D)	Pat Henry (D)	Andrew F. Fox (D)	John Sharp; Williams (D)	Frank A. McLain (D)	Charles E. Hooker (D)

==== 1903–1953: 8, then 7 seats ====
Congress	District							
Congress	1st	2nd	3rd	4th	5th	6th	7th	8th
58th (1903–1905)	Ezekiel; Candler (D)	Thomas; Spight (D)	Benjamin G. Humphreys (D)	Wilson S. Hill (D)	Adam M. Byrd (D)	Eaton J. Bowers (D)	Frank A. McLain (D)	John Sharp; Williams (D)
59th (1905–1907)	Ezekiel; Candler (D)	Thomas; Spight (D)	Benjamin G. Humphreys (D)	Wilson S. Hill (D)	Adam M. Byrd (D)	Eaton J. Bowers (D)	Frank A. McLain (D)	John Sharp; Williams (D)
60th (1907–1909)	Ezekiel; Candler (D)	Thomas; Spight (D)	Benjamin G. Humphreys (D)	Wilson S. Hill (D)	Adam M. Byrd (D)	Eaton J. Bowers (D)	Frank A. McLain (D)	John Sharp; Williams (D)
61st (1909–1911)	Ezekiel; Candler (D)	Thomas; Spight (D)	Benjamin G. Humphreys (D)	Thomas U. Sisson (D)	Adam M. Byrd (D)	Eaton J. Bowers (D)	William A. Dickson (D)	James; Collier (D)
62nd (1911–1913)	Ezekiel; Candler (D)	Hubert D. Stephens (D)	Benjamin G. Humphreys (D)	Thomas U. Sisson (D)	Samuel A. Witherspoon (D)	Pat; Harrison (D)	William A. Dickson (D)	James; Collier (D)
63rd (1913–1915)	Ezekiel; Candler (D)	Hubert D. Stephens (D)	Benjamin G. Humphreys (D)	Thomas U. Sisson (D)	Samuel A. Witherspoon (D)	Pat; Harrison (D)	Percy Quin (D)	James; Collier (D)
64th (1915–1917)	Ezekiel; Candler (D)	Hubert D. Stephens (D)	Benjamin G. Humphreys (D)	Thomas U. Sisson (D)	Samuel A. Witherspoon (D)	Pat; Harrison (D)	Percy Quin (D)	James; Collier (D)
64th (1915–1917)	Ezekiel; Candler (D)	Hubert D. Stephens (D)	Benjamin G. Humphreys (D)	Thomas U. Sisson (D)	William W. Venable (D)	Pat; Harrison (D)	Percy Quin (D)	James; Collier (D)
65th (1917–1919)	Ezekiel; Candler (D)	Hubert D. Stephens (D)	Benjamin G. Humphreys (D)	Thomas U. Sisson (D)	William W. Venable (D)	Pat; Harrison (D)	Percy Quin (D)	James; Collier (D)
66th (1919–1921)	Ezekiel; Candler (D)	Hubert D. Stephens (D)	Benjamin G. Humphreys (D)	Thomas U. Sisson (D)	William W. Venable (D)	Paul B. Johnson Sr. (D)	Percy Quin (D)	James; Collier (D)
67th (1921–1923)	John E. Rankin (D)	Bill G. Lowrey (D)	Benjamin G. Humphreys (D)	Thomas U. Sisson (D)	Ross A. Collins (D)	Paul B. Johnson Sr. (D)	Percy Quin (D)	James; Collier (D)
68th (1923–1925)	John E. Rankin (D)	Bill G. Lowrey (D)	Benjamin G. Humphreys (D)	T. Jeff; Busby (D)	Ross A. Collins (D)	T. Webber; Wilson (D)	Percy Quin (D)	James; Collier (D)
68th (1923–1925)	John E. Rankin (D)	Bill G. Lowrey (D)	W. Y. Humphreys (D)	T. Jeff; Busby (D)	Ross A. Collins (D)	T. Webber; Wilson (D)	Percy Quin (D)	James; Collier (D)
69th (1925–1927)	John E. Rankin (D)	Bill G. Lowrey (D)	William Madison; Whittington (D)	T. Jeff; Busby (D)	Ross A. Collins (D)	T. Webber; Wilson (D)	Percy Quin (D)	James; Collier (D)
70th (1927–1929)	John E. Rankin (D)	Bill G. Lowrey (D)	William Madison; Whittington (D)	T. Jeff; Busby (D)	Ross A. Collins (D)	T. Webber; Wilson (D)	Percy Quin (D)	James; Collier (D)
71st (1929–1931)	John E. Rankin (D)	Wall; Doxey (D)	William Madison; Whittington (D)	T. Jeff; Busby (D)	Ross A. Collins (D)	Robert S. Hall (D)	Percy Quin (D)	James; Collier (D)
72nd (1931–1933)	John E. Rankin (D)	Wall; Doxey (D)	William Madison; Whittington (D)	T. Jeff; Busby (D)	Ross A. Collins (D)	Robert S. Hall (D)	Percy Quin (D)	James; Collier (D)
72nd (1931–1933)	John E. Rankin (D)	Wall; Doxey (D)	William Madison; Whittington (D)	T. Jeff; Busby (D)	Ross A. Collins (D)	Robert S. Hall (D)	Lawrence R. Ellzey (D)	James; Collier (D)
73rd (1933–1935)	John E. Rankin (D)	Wall; Doxey (D)	William Madison; Whittington (D)	T. Jeff; Busby (D)	Ross A. Collins (D)	William M. Colmer (D)	Lawrence R. Ellzey (D)	
74th (1935–1937)	John E. Rankin (D)	Wall; Doxey (D)	William Madison; Whittington (D)	Aaron L. Ford (D)	Aubert C. Dunn (D)	William M. Colmer (D)	Dan R. McGehee (D)	
75th (1937–1939)	John E. Rankin (D)	Wall; Doxey (D)	William Madison; Whittington (D)	Aaron L. Ford (D)	Ross A. Collins (D)	William M. Colmer (D)	Dan R. McGehee (D)	
76th (1939–1941)	John E. Rankin (D)	Wall; Doxey (D)	William Madison; Whittington (D)	Aaron L. Ford (D)	Ross A. Collins (D)	William M. Colmer (D)	Dan R. McGehee (D)	
77th (1941–1943)	John E. Rankin (D)	Wall; Doxey (D)	William Madison; Whittington (D)	Aaron L. Ford (D)	Ross A. Collins (D)	William M. Colmer (D)	Dan R. McGehee (D)	
77th (1941–1943)	John E. Rankin (D)	Jamie; Whitten (D)	William Madison; Whittington (D)	Aaron L. Ford (D)	Ross A. Collins (D)	William M. Colmer (D)	Dan R. McGehee (D)	
78th (1943–1945)	John E. Rankin (D)	Jamie; Whitten (D)	William Madison; Whittington (D)	Thomas; Abernethy (D)	Arthur; Winstead (D)	William M. Colmer (D)	Dan R. McGehee (D)	
79th (1945–1947)	John E. Rankin (D)	Jamie; Whitten (D)	William Madison; Whittington (D)	Thomas; Abernethy (D)	Arthur; Winstead (D)	William M. Colmer (D)	Dan R. McGehee (D)	
80th (1947–1949)	John E. Rankin (D)	Jamie; Whitten (D)	William Madison; Whittington (D)	Thomas; Abernethy (D)	Arthur; Winstead (D)	William M. Colmer (D)	John Bell; Williams (D)	
81st (1949–1951)	John E. Rankin (D)	Jamie; Whitten (D)	William Madison; Whittington (D)	Thomas; Abernethy (D)	Arthur; Winstead (D)	William M. Colmer (D)	John Bell; Williams (D)	
82nd (1951–1953)	John E. Rankin (D)	Jamie; Whitten (D)	Frank E. Smith (D)	Thomas; Abernethy (D)	Arthur; Winstead (D)	William M. Colmer (D)	John Bell; Williams (D)	

==== 1953–1963: 6 seats ====
Congress	1st district	2nd district	3rd district	4th district	5th district	6th district
83rd (1953–1955)	Thomas; Abernethy (D)	Jamie; Whitten (D)	Frank Ellis; Smith (D)	John Bell; Williams (D)	Arthur; Winstead (D)	William M. Colmer (D)
84th (1955–1957)	Thomas; Abernethy (D)	Jamie; Whitten (D)	Frank Ellis; Smith (D)	John Bell; Williams (D)	Arthur; Winstead (D)	William M. Colmer (D)
85th (1957–1959)	Thomas; Abernethy (D)	Jamie; Whitten (D)	Frank Ellis; Smith (D)	John Bell; Williams (D)	Arthur; Winstead (D)	William M. Colmer (D)
86th (1959–1961)	Thomas; Abernethy (D)	Jamie; Whitten (D)	Frank Ellis; Smith (D)	John Bell; Williams (D)	Arthur; Winstead (D)	William M. Colmer (D)
87th (1961–1963)	Thomas; Abernethy (D)	Jamie; Whitten (D)	Frank Ellis; Smith (D)	John Bell; Williams (D)	Arthur; Winstead (D)	William M. Colmer (D)

==== 1963–present: 5, then 4 seats ====
Congress	1st district	2nd district	3rd district	4th district	5th district
88th (1963–1965)	Thomas; Abernethy (D)	Jamie Whitten (D)	John Bell; Williams (D)	Arthur Winstead (D)	William M. Colmer (D)
89th (1965–1967)	Thomas; Abernethy (D)	Jamie Whitten (D)	John Bell; Williams (D)	Prentiss Walker (R)	William M. Colmer (D)
90th (1967–1969)	Thomas; Abernethy (D)	Jamie Whitten (D)	John Bell; Williams (D)	Sonny; Montgomery (D)	William M. Colmer (D)
90th (1967–1969)	Thomas; Abernethy (D)	Jamie Whitten (D)	Charles H. Griffin (D)	Sonny; Montgomery (D)	William M. Colmer (D)
91st (1969–1971)	Thomas; Abernethy (D)	Jamie Whitten (D)	Charles H. Griffin (D)	Sonny; Montgomery (D)	William M. Colmer (D)
92nd (1971–1973)	Thomas; Abernethy (D)	Jamie Whitten (D)	Charles H. Griffin (D)	Sonny; Montgomery (D)	William M. Colmer (D)
93rd (1973–1975)	Jamie; Whitten (D)	David R. Bowen (D)	Sonny; Montgomery (D)	Thad Cochran (R)	Trent Lott (R)
94th (1975–1977)	Jamie; Whitten (D)	David R. Bowen (D)	Sonny; Montgomery (D)	Thad Cochran (R)	Trent Lott (R)
95th (1977–1979)	Jamie; Whitten (D)	David R. Bowen (D)	Sonny; Montgomery (D)	Thad Cochran (R)	Trent Lott (R)
96th (1979–1981)	Jamie; Whitten (D)	David R. Bowen (D)	Sonny; Montgomery (D)	Jon Hinson (R)	Trent Lott (R)
97th (1981–1983)	Jamie; Whitten (D)	David R. Bowen (D)	Sonny; Montgomery (D)	Jon Hinson (R)	Trent Lott (R)
97th (1981–1983)	Jamie; Whitten (D)	David R. Bowen (D)	Sonny; Montgomery (D)	Wayne Dowdy (D)	Trent Lott (R)
98th (1983–1985)	Jamie; Whitten (D)	Webb Franklin (R)	Sonny; Montgomery (D)	Wayne Dowdy (D)	Trent Lott (R)
99th (1985–1987)	Jamie; Whitten (D)	Webb Franklin (R)	Sonny; Montgomery (D)	Wayne Dowdy (D)	Trent Lott (R)
100th (1987–1989)	Jamie; Whitten (D)	Mike Espy (D)	Sonny; Montgomery (D)	Wayne Dowdy (D)	Trent Lott (R)
101st (1989–1991)	Jamie; Whitten (D)	Mike Espy (D)	Sonny; Montgomery (D)	Michael Parker (D)	Larkin I. Smith (R)
101st (1989–1991)	Jamie; Whitten (D)	Mike Espy (D)	Sonny; Montgomery (D)	Michael Parker (D)	Gene Taylor (D)
102nd (1991–1993)	Jamie; Whitten (D)	Mike Espy (D)	Sonny; Montgomery (D)	Michael Parker (D)	Gene Taylor (D)
103rd (1993–1995)	Jamie; Whitten (D)	Mike Espy (D)	Sonny; Montgomery (D)	Michael Parker (D)	Gene Taylor (D)
103rd (1993–1995)	Jamie; Whitten (D)	Bennie; Thompson (D)	Sonny; Montgomery (D)	Michael Parker (D)	Gene Taylor (D)
104th (1995–1997)	Roger; Wicker (R)	Bennie; Thompson (D)	Sonny; Montgomery (D)	Michael Parker (R)	Gene Taylor (D)
105th (1997–1999)	Roger; Wicker (R)	Bennie; Thompson (D)	Chip Pickering (R)	Michael Parker (R)	Gene Taylor (D)
106th (1999–2001)	Roger; Wicker (R)	Bennie; Thompson (D)	Chip Pickering (R)	Ronnie Shows (D)	Gene Taylor (D)
107th (2001–2003)	Roger; Wicker (R)	Bennie; Thompson (D)	Chip Pickering (R)	Ronnie Shows (D)	Gene Taylor (D)
108th (2003–2005)	Roger; Wicker (R)	Bennie; Thompson (D)	Chip Pickering (R)	Gene Taylor (D)	seat eliminated
109th (2005–2007)	Roger; Wicker (R)	Bennie; Thompson (D)	Chip Pickering (R)	Gene Taylor (D)	seat eliminated
110th (2007–2009)	Roger; Wicker (R)	Bennie; Thompson (D)	Chip Pickering (R)	Gene Taylor (D)	seat eliminated
110th (2007–2009)	Travis; Childers (D)	Bennie; Thompson (D)	Chip Pickering (R)	Gene Taylor (D)	seat eliminated
111th (2009–2011)	Travis; Childers (D)	Bennie; Thompson (D)	Gregg; Harper (R)	Gene Taylor (D)	seat eliminated
112th (2011–2013)	Alan; Nunnelee (R)	Bennie; Thompson (D)	Gregg; Harper (R)	Steven Palazzo (R)	seat eliminated
113th (2013–2015)	Alan; Nunnelee (R)	Bennie; Thompson (D)	Gregg; Harper (R)	Steven Palazzo (R)	seat eliminated
114th (2015–2017)	Alan; Nunnelee (R)	Bennie; Thompson (D)	Gregg; Harper (R)	Steven Palazzo (R)	seat eliminated
114th (2015–2017)	Trent Kelly (R)	Bennie; Thompson (D)	Gregg; Harper (R)	Steven Palazzo (R)	seat eliminated
115th (2017–2019)	Trent Kelly (R)	Bennie; Thompson (D)	Gregg; Harper (R)	Steven Palazzo (R)	seat eliminated
116th (2019–2021)	Trent Kelly (R)	Bennie; Thompson (D)	Michael; Guest (R)	Steven Palazzo (R)	seat eliminated
117th (2021–2023)	Trent Kelly (R)	Bennie; Thompson (D)	Michael; Guest (R)	Steven Palazzo (R)	seat eliminated
118th (2023–2025)	Trent Kelly (R)	Bennie; Thompson (D)	Michael; Guest (R)	Mike Ezell (R)	seat eliminated
119th (2025–2027)	Trent Kelly (R)	Bennie; Thompson (D)	Michael; Guest (R)	Mike Ezell (R)	seat eliminated
120th (2027–2029)	Trent Kelly (R)	Bennie; Thompson (D)	Michael; Guest (R)	Mike Ezell (R)	seat eliminated

== Key ==
Democratic (D)
Democratic-Republican (DR)
Jacksonian (J)
Know Nothing (KN)
National Republican (NR)
Republican (R)
Union (U)
Whig (W)
Independent (I)

== See also ==
- List of United States congressional districts
- Mississippi's congressional districts
- Political party strength in Mississippi
