= List of United States representatives from Mississippi =

The following is an alphabetical list of United States representatives from the state of Mississippi. For chronological tables of members of both houses of the United States Congress from the state (through the present day), see Mississippi's congressional delegations. The list of names should be complete as of January 3, 2025, but other data may be incomplete.

== Current representatives ==
Current as of January 3, 2025.

- 1st district: Trent Kelly (R) (since 2015)
- 2nd district: Bennie Thompson (D) (since 1993)
- 3rd district: Michael Guest (R) (since 2019)
- 4th district: Mike Ezell (R) (since 2023)

== List of members ==
Member	Years	Party	District	Notes
Thomas G. Abernethy	January 3, 1943 – January 3, 1953	Democratic	4th	Elected in 1942. Redistricted to the 1st district.
Thomas G. Abernethy	January 3, 1953 – January 3, 1973	Democratic	1st	Redistricted from the 4th district and re-elected in 1952. Retired.
Stephen Adams	March 4, 1845 – March 3, 1847	Democratic	At-large	Elected in 1845. Retired.
John Allen	March 4, 1885 – March 3, 1901	Democratic	1st	Elected in 1884. Retired.
Chapman L. Anderson	March 4, 1887 – March 3, 1891	Democratic	5th	Elected in 1886. Lost renomination to Beeman.
Ethelbert Barksdale	March 4, 1883 – March 3, 1887	Democratic	7th	Elected in 1882. Lost renomination to Hooker.
William Barksdale	March 4, 1853 – March 3, 1855	Democratic	At-large	Elected in 1853. Redistricted to the 3rd district.
William Barksdale	March 4, 1855 – January 12, 1861	Democratic	3rd	Redistricted from the at-large district and re-elected in 1855. Withdrew due to Civil War.
Frederick G. Barry	March 4, 1885 – March 3, 1889	Democratic	4th	Elected in 1884. Retired.
Henry W. Barry	April 8, 1870 – March 3, 1875	Republican	3rd	Elected in 1869 to finish the vacant term and to the next term. Retired.
William T. S. Barry	March 4, 1853 – March 3, 1855	Democratic	2nd	Elected in 1853. Retired to run for state representative.
Joseph H. Beeman	March 4, 1891 – March 3, 1893	Democratic	5th	Elected in 1890. Retired.
Hendley Bennett	March 4, 1855 – March 3, 1857	Democratic	2nd	Elected in 1855. Lost renomination to R. Davis.
David R. Bowen	January 3, 1973 – January 3, 1983	Democratic	2nd	Elected in 1972. Retired.
Eaton Bowers	March 4, 1903 – March 3, 1911	Democratic	6th	Elected in 1902. Retired.
Albert G. Brown	March 4, 1839 – March 3, 1841	Democratic	At-large	Elected in 1839. Retired.
Albert G. Brown	March 4, 1847 – March 3, 1853	Democratic	4th	Elected in 1847. Retired.
T. Jeff Busby	March 4, 1923 – January 3, 1935	Democratic	4th	Elected in 1922. Lost renomination to Ford.
Adam M. Byrd	March 4, 1903 – March 3, 1911	Democratic	5th	Elected in 1902. Lost renomination to Witherspoon.
Harry Cage	March 4, 1833 – March 3, 1835	Jacksonian	At-large	Elected in 1832. Retired.
Ezekiel S. Candler Jr.	March 4, 1901 – March 3, 1921	Democratic	1st	Elected in 1900. Lost renomination to J. Rankin.
Thomas C. Catchings	March 4, 1885 – March 3, 1901	Democratic	3rd	Elected in 1884. Retired.
James R. Chalmers	March 4, 1877 – April 29, 1882	Democratic	6th	Elected in 1876. Lost contested election to Lynch.
James R. Chalmers	June 25, 1884 – March 3, 1885	Independent	2nd	Won contested election. Lost re-election to Morgan.
Travis Childers	May 13, 2008 – January 3, 2011	Democratic	1st	Elected to finish Wicker's term. Lost re-election to Nunnelee.
John F. H. Claiborne	March 4, 1835 – March 3, 1837	Jacksonian	At-large	Elected in 1835. Re-elected but election was invalidated.
John F. H. Claiborne	July 18, 1837 – February 5, 1838	Democratic	At-large	Credentials presented but election successfully contest and seat declared vacant.
Thad Cochran	January 3, 1973 – December 26, 1978	Republican	4th	Elected in 1972. Retired to run for U.S senator and resigned when appointed.
James Collier	March 4, 1909 – March 3, 1933	Democratic	8th	Elected in 1908. Retired.
Ross A. Collins	March 4, 1921 – January 3, 1935	Democratic	5th	Elected in 1920. Retired to run for U.S. senator.
Ross A. Collins	January 3, 1937 – January 3, 1943	Democratic	5th	Elected in 1936. Retired to run for U.S. senator.
William M. Colmer	March 4, 1933 – January 3, 1963	Democratic	6th	Elected in 1932. Redistricted to the 5th district.
William M. Colmer	January 3, 1963 – January 3, 1973	Democratic	5th	Redistricted from the 6th district and re-elected in 1962. Retired.
Jefferson Davis	March 4, 1845 – June ??, 1846	Democratic	At-large	Elected in 1845. Resigned to command regiment in Mexican–American War.
Reuben Davis	March 4, 1857 – January 12, 1861	Democratic	2nd	Elected in 1857. Withdrew due to Civil War.
Walter Denny	March 4, 1895 – March 3, 1897	Democratic	6th	Elected in 1894. Lost renomination to Love.
David Dickson	March 4, 1835 – July 31, 1836	Anti-Jacksonian	At-large	Elected in 1835. Died.
William A. Dickson	March 4, 1909 – March 3, 1913	Democratic	7th	Elected in 1908. Retired.
Wayne Dowdy	January 3, 1981 – January 3, 1989	Democratic	4th	Elected to finish Hinson's term. Retired to run for U.S senator.
Wall Doxey	March 4, 1929 – September 23, 1941	Democratic	2nd	Elected in 1928. Re-elected in 1940. Resigned when elected U.S. senator.
Aubert C. Dunn	January 3, 1935 – January 3, 1937	Democratic	5th	Elected in 1934. Retired.
Henry T. Ellett	January 26, 1847 – March 3, 1847	Democratic	At-large	Elected to finish Davis's term. Retired.
Lawrence R. Ellzey	March 15, 1932 – January 3, 1935	Democratic	7th	Elected to finish Quin's term. Lost renomination to McGehee.
Mike Espy	January 3, 1987 – January 22, 1993	Democratic	2nd	Elected in 1986. Resigned to become Secretary of Agriculture.
Mike Ezell	January 3, 2023 – present	Republican	4th	Elected in 2022. Incumbent.
Winfield S. Featherston	March 4, 1847 – March 3, 1851	Democratic	2nd	Elected in 1846. Lost re-election to Wilcox.
Aaron L. Ford	January 3, 1935 – January 3, 1943	Democratic	4th	Elected in 1934. Lost renomination to Abernethy.
Andrew F. Fox	March 4, 1897 – March 3, 1903	Democratic	4th	Elected in 1896. Retired.
William W. Franklin	January 3, 1983 – January 3, 1987	Republican	2nd	Elected in 1982. Lost re-election to Espy.
John D. Freeman	March 4, 1851 – March 3, 1853	Union	3rd	Elected in 1851. Retired.
Samuel J. Gholson	December 1, 1836 – March 3, 1837	Jacksonian	At-large	Elected to finish Dickson's term. Re-elected but election was invalidated.
Samuel J. Gholson	July 18, 1837 – February 5, 1838	Democratic	At-large	Credentials presented but election successfully contest and seat declared vacant.
Thomas M. Green	December 6, 1802 – March 3, 1803	Democratic-Republican	Territory	Elected to finish Hunter's term. Retired.
Charles H. Griffin	March 12, 1968 – January 3, 1973	Democratic	3rd	Elected to finish Williams's term. Retired.
Michael Guest	January 3, 2019 – present	Republican	3rd	Elected in 2018. Incumbent.
William M. Gwin	March 4, 1841 – March 3, 1843	Democratic	At-large	Elected in 1841. Renominated but declined.
William Haile	July 10, 1826 – July 10, 1828	Jacksonian	At-large	Elected to finish C. Rankin's term. Lost re-election to Hinds and resigned early.
Robert S. Hall	March 4, 1929 – March 3, 1933	Democratic	6th	Elected in 1928. Lost renomination to Colmer.
William H. Hammett	March 4, 1843 – March 3, 1845	Democratic	At-large	Elected in 1843. Retired.
Gregg Harper	January 3, 2009 – January 3, 2019	Republican	3rd	Elected in 2008. Retired.
George E. Harris	February 23, 1870 – March 3, 1873	Republican	1st	Elected in 1869 to finish the term and to the next term. Retired.
Wiley P. Harris	March 4, 1853 – March 3, 1855	Democratic	4th	Elected in 1853. Retired.
Pat Harrison	March 4, 1911 – March 3, 1919	Democratic	6th	Elected in 1910. Retired.
Patrick Henry	March 4, 1897 – March 3, 1901	Democratic	7th	Elected in 1896. Lost renomination to Hooker.
Patrick Stevens Henry	March 4, 1901 – March 3, 1903	Democratic	3rd	Elected in 1900. Lost renomination to B. Humphreys.
Wilson S. Hill	March 4, 1903 – March 3, 1909	Democratic	4th	Elected in 1902. Lost renomination to Sisson.
Thomas Hinds	October 21, 1828 – March 3, 1831	Jacksonian	At-large	Elected to finish Haile's term. (Note: Hinds was Elected in 1828 beating incumbent William Haile, who then resigned, and Hinds was elected to finish his term.); Retired.
Jon Hinson	January 3, 1979 – July 7, 1981	Republican	4th	Elected in 1978. Resigned due to arrest for attempted sodomy.
Charles E. Hooker	March 4, 1875 – March 3, 1883	Democratic	5th	Elected in 1874. Retired.
Charles E. Hooker	March 4, 1887 – March 3, 1895	Democratic	7th	Elected in 1886. Retired.
Charles E. Hooker	March 4, 1901 – March 3, 1903	Democratic	7th	Elected in 1900. Retired.
Albert Howe	March 4, 1873 – March 3, 1875	Republican	2nd	Elected in 1872. Lost re-election to Wells.
Benjamin G. Humphreys	March 4, 1903 – October 16, 1923	Democratic	3rd	Elected in 1902. Died.
William Y. Humphreys	November 27, 1923 – March 3, 1925	Democratic	3rd	Elected to finish his father's term. Retired.
Narsworthy Hunter	December 7, 1801 – March 11, 1802	Democratic-Republican	Territory	Elected in 1801. Died.
Elza Jeffords	March 4, 1883 – March 3, 1885	Republican	3rd	Elected in 1882; Retired.
Paul B. Johnson Sr.	March 4, 1919 – March 3, 1923	Democratic	6th	Elected in 1918. Retired.
Trent Kelly	June 2, 2015 – present	Republican	1st	Elected to finish Nunnelee's term. Incumbent.
John C. Kyle	March 4, 1891 – March 3, 1897	Democratic	2nd	Elected in 1890. Retired.
William A. Lake	March 4, 1855 – March 3, 1857	Know Nothing	4th	Elected in 1855. Lost re-election to Singleton.
L. Q. C. Lamar	March 4, 1857 – December 20, 1860	Democratic	1st	Elected in 1857. Resigned to become a member of the secession convention of Mississippi.
L. Q. C. Lamar	March 4, 1873 – March 3, 1877	Democratic	1st	Elected in 1872. Retired to run for U.S. senator.
William Lattimore	March 4, 1803 – March 3, 1807	Democratic-Republican	Territory	Elected in 1803. Retired.
William Lattimore	March 4, 1813 – March 3, 1817	Democratic-Republican	Territory	Elected in 1813. Retired.
Clarke Lewis	March 4, 1889 – March 3, 1893	Democratic	4th	Elected in 1888. Retired.
Trent Lott	January 3, 1973 – January 3, 1989	Republican	5th	Elected in 1972. Retired to run for U.S. senator.
William Love	March 4, 1897 – October 16, 1898	Democratic	6th	Elected in 1896. Died.
Bill G. Lowrey	March 4, 1921 – March 3, 1929	Democratic	2nd	Elected in 1920. Lost renomination to Doxey.
John R. Lynch	March 4, 1873 – March 3, 1877	Republican	6th	Elected in 1872. Lost re-election to Chalmers.
John R. Lynch	April 29, 1882 – March 3, 1883	Republican	6th	Won contested election. Lost re-election to Van Eaton.
Van H. Manning	March 4, 1877 – March 3, 1883	Democratic	2nd	Elected in 1876. Lost contested election to Chalmers.
Dan R. McGehee	January 3, 1935 – January 3, 1947	Democratic	7th	Elected in 1934. Lost renomination to J.B. Williams.
George C. McKee	February 23, 1870 – March 3, 1873	Republican	4th	Elected in 1869 to finish the vacant term and to the next term. (Note: Previously elected in 1868, but that election was rejected by the House.); Redistricted to the 5th district.
George C. McKee	March 4, 1873 – March 3, 1875	Republican	5th	Redistricted from the 4th district and re-elected in 1872. Retired.
Frank McLain	December 12, 1898 – March 3, 1903	Democratic	6th	Elected to finish Love's term. Redistricted to the 7th district.
Frank McLain	March 4, 1903 – March 3, 1909	Democratic	7th	Redistricted from the 6th district and re-elected in 1902. Retired.
John Jones McRae	December 7, 1858 – January 12, 1861	Democratic	5th	Elected to finish Quitman's term. Withdrew due to Civil War.
William McWillie	March 4, 1849 – March 3, 1851	Democratic	3rd	Elected in 1848. Lost re-election to Freeman.
Hernando D. Money	March 4, 1875 – March 3, 1883	Democratic	3rd	Elected in 1874. Redistricted to the 4th district.
Hernando D. Money	March 4, 1883 – March 3, 1885	Democratic	4th	Redistricted from the 3rd district and re-elected in 1882. Retired.
Hernando D. Money	March 4, 1893 – March 3, 1897	Democratic	4th	Elected in 1892. Retired.
Sonny Montgomery	January 3, 1967 – January 3, 1973	Democratic	4th	Elected in 1966. Redistricted to the 3rd district.
Sonny Montgomery	January 3, 1973 – January 3, 1997	Democratic	3rd	Redistricted from the 4th district and re-elected in 1972. Retired.
James B. Morgan	March 4, 1885 – March 3, 1891	Democratic	2nd	Elected in 1884. Retired.
Joseph Morphis	March 4, 1870 – March 3, 1873	Republican	2nd	Elected in 1869 to finish the term and to the next term. Lost renomination to Howe.
Henry Muldrow	March 4, 1877 – March 3, 1885	Democratic	1st	Elected in 1876. Retired to become First Assistant Secretary of the Interior.
Benjamin Nabers	March 4, 1851 – March 3, 1853	Union	1st	Elected in 1851. Lost re-election to Wright.
Jason Niles	March 4, 1873 – March 3, 1875	Republican	4th	Elected in 1872. Lost re-election to Singleton.
Alan Nunnelee	January 3, 2011 – February 6, 2015	Republican	1st	Elected in 2010. Died.
Steven Palazzo	January 3, 2011 – January 3, 2023	Republican	4th	Elected in 2010. Lost renomination to Ezell.
Michael Parker	January 3, 1989 – November 10, 1995	Democratic	4th	Elected in 1988. Switched parties.
Michael Parker	November 10, 1995 – January 3, 1999	Republican	4th	Switched parties and Re-elected in 1996 as a Republican. Retired to run for governor.
Legrand W. Perce	February 23, 1870 – March 3, 1873	Republican	5th	Elected in 1869 to finish the term and to the next term. Retired.
Chip Pickering	January 3, 1997 – January 3, 2009	Republican	3rd	Elected in 1996. Retired.
Franklin E. Plummer	March 4, 1831 – March 3, 1835	Jacksonian	At-large	Elected in 1830. Retired to run for U.S. senator.
George Poindexter	March 4, 1807 – March 3, 1813	Democratic-Republican	Territory	Elected in 1806. Retired.
George Poindexter	December 10, 1817 – March 3, 1819	Democratic-Republican	At-large	Elected in 1817. Retired.
Seargent S. Prentiss	May 29, 1838 – March 3, 1839	Whig	At-large	Elected to finish Claiborne's term. Retired.
Percy Quin	March 4, 1913 – February 4, 1932	Democratic	7th	Elected in 1912. Died.
John A. Quitman	March 4, 1855 – July 17, 1858	Democratic	5th	Elected in 1855. Died.
Christopher Rankin	March 4, 1819 – March 3, 1825	Democratic-Republican	At-large	Elected in 1819. Switched parties.
Christopher Rankin	March 4, 1825 – March 3, 1826	Jacksonian	At-large	Re-elected in 1824 as a Jacksonian. Died.
John E. Rankin	March 4, 1921 – January 3, 1953	Democratic	1st	Elected in 1920. Lost renomination to Abernethy.
Robert W. Roberts	March 4, 1843 – March 3, 1847	Democratic	At-large	Elected in 1843. Redistricted to the 3rd district and lost re-election to Tompkins.
Ronnie Shows	January 3, 1999 – January 3, 2003	Democratic	4th	Elected in 1998. Redistricted to the 3rd district and lost re-election to Pickering.
Otho R. Singleton	March 4, 1853 – March 3, 1855	Democratic	3rd	Elected in 1853. Redistricted to the 4th district and lost re-election to Lake.
Otho R. Singleton	March 4, 1857 – January 12, 1861	Democratic	4th	Elected in 1857. Withdrew due to Civil War.
Otho R. Singleton	March 4, 1875 – March 3, 1883	Democratic	4th	Elected in 1874. Redistricted to the 5th district.
Otho R. Singleton	March 4, 1883 – March 3, 1887	Democratic	5th	Redistricted from the 4th district and re-elected in 1882. Retired.
Thomas U. Sisson	March 4, 1909 – March 3, 1923	Democratic	4th	Elected in 1908. Lost renomination to Busby.
Frank E. Smith	January 3, 1951 – November 14, 1962	Democratic	3rd	Elected in 1950. Retired and resigned to become a member of the Board of Directors of the Tennessee Valley Authority.
Larkin I. Smith	January 3, 1989 – August 13, 1989	Republican	5th	Elected in 1988. Died.
James G. Spencer	March 4, 1895 – March 3, 1897	Democratic	7th	Elected in 1894. Retired.
Thomas Spight	July 5, 1898 – March 3, 1911	Democratic	2nd	Elected to finish Sullivan's term. Lost renomination to Stephens.
Hubert D. Stephens	March 4, 1911 – March 3, 1921	Democratic	2nd	Elected in 1910. Retired.
Thomas Stockdale	March 4, 1887 – March 3, 1895	Democratic	6th	Elected in 1886. Lost renomination to Denny.
William V. Sullivan	March 4, 1897 – May 31, 1898	Democratic	2nd	Elected in 1896. Resigned when appointed U.S. senator.
Gene Taylor	October 17, 1989 – January 3, 2003	Democratic	5th	Elected to finish Smith's term. Redistricted to the 4th district.
Gene Taylor	January 3, 2003 – January 3, 2011	Democratic	4th	Redistricted from the 5th district and re-elected in 2002. Lost re-election to Palazzo.
Bennie Thompson	April 13, 1993 – present	Democratic	2nd	Elected to finish Espy's term. Incumbent.
Jacob Thompson	March 4, 1839 – March 3, 1847	Democratic	At-large	Elected in 1839. Redistricted to the 1st district.
Jacob Thompson	March 4, 1847 – March 3, 1851	Democratic	1st	Redistricted from the at-large district and re-elected in 1846. Lost re-election to Nabers.
Patrick W. Tompkins	March 4, 1847 – March 3, 1849	Whig	3rd	Elected in 1846. Retired.
Tilghman Tucker	March 4, 1843 – March 3, 1845	Democratic	At-large	Elected in 1843. Retired.
Henry Van Eaton	March 4, 1883 – March 3, 1887	Democratic	6th	Elected in 1882. Retired.
William W. Venable	January 4, 1916 – March 3, 1921	Democratic	5th	Elected to finish Witherspoon's term. Lost renomination to Collins.
Prentiss Walker	January 3, 1965 – January 3, 1967	Republican	4th	Elected in 1964. Retired to run for U.S. senator.
Guilford Wells	March 4, 1875 – March 3, 1877	Independent Republican	2nd	Elected in 1874. Retired.
Jamie Whitten	November 4, 1941 – January 3, 1973	Democratic	2nd	Elected to finish Doxey's term. Redistricted to the 1st district.
Jamie Whitten	January 3, 1973 – January 3, 1995	Democratic	1st	Redistricted from the 2nd district and re-elected in 1972. Retired.
William M. Whittington	March 4, 1925 – January 3, 1951	Democratic	3rd	Elected in 1924. Retired.
Roger Wicker	January 3, 1995 – December 31, 2007	Republican	1st	Elected in 1994. Resigned when appointed U.S. senator.
John A. Wilcox	March 4, 1851 – March 3, 1853	Whig	2nd	Elected in 1851. Lost re-election to W. Barry.
John B. Williams	January 3, 1947 – January 3, 1953	Democratic	7th	Elected in 1946. Redistricted to the 4th district.
John B. Williams	January 3, 1953 – January 3, 1963	Democratic	4th	Redistricted from the 7th district and re-elected in 1952. Redistricted to the 3rd district.
John B. Williams	January 3, 1963 – January 16, 1968	Democratic	3rd	Redistricted from the 4th district and re-elected in 1962. Resigned when elected governor.
John S. Williams	March 4, 1893 – March 3, 1903	Democratic	5th	Elected in 1892. Redistricted to the 8th district.
John S. Williams	March 4, 1903 – March 3, 1909	Democratic	8th	Redistricted from the 5th district and re-elected in 1902. Retired to run for U.S. senator.
T. Webber Wilson	March 4, 1923 – March 3, 1929	Democratic	6th	Elected in 1922. Retired to run for U.S. senator.
W. Arthur Winstead	January 3, 1943 – January 3, 1963	Democratic	5th	Elected in 1942. Redistricted to the 4th district.
W. Arthur Winstead	January 3, 1963 – January 3, 1965	Democratic	4th	Redistricted from the 5th district and re-elected in 1962. Lost re-election to Walker.
Samuel A. Witherspoon	March 4, 1911 – November 24, 1915	Democratic	5th	Elected in 1910. Died.
Thomas J. Word	May 29, 1838 – March 3, 1839	Whig	At-large	Elected to finish Gholson's term. Retired.
Daniel B. Wright	March 4, 1853 – March 3, 1857	Democratic	1st	Elected in 1853. Retired.

== See also ==
- List of United States senators from Mississippi
- Mississippi's congressional delegations
- Mississippi's congressional districts
