= Mississippi's 5th congressional district =

Former U.S. House district in Mississippi

Coordinates: 30.607817°N 88.793113°W

- Obsolete district
- Created: 1855
- Eliminated: 2000
- Years active: 1855-2003

Mississippi's 5th congressional district existed from 1855 to 2003. The state was granted a fifth representative by Congress following the 1850 census.

From 1853 to 1855, the fifth representative was elected at-large instead of by district, favoring majority voters. The district was abolished by the state legislature following the 2000 census, when the state lost a seat.

== Boundaries ==
Although the boundaries of the fifth congressional district were altered after every census, it covered the Gulf Coast region and most of the Pine Belt region in southeastern Mississippi from 1993 to 2003.

It included all of Forrest, George, Greene, Hancock, Harrison, Jackson, Lamar, Pearl River, Perry, and Stone counties as well as a portion of Wayne County.

After it was abolished, most of the fifth district was absorbed by the state's fourth congressional district.

== 2000 election ==
The district's last election took place on November 7, 2000. Incumbent Gene Taylor, who had represented the district since a special election in 1989, easily won re-election.

United States House election, 2000: Mississippi District 5
Party	Candidate	Votes	%	±%
Democratic	Gene Taylor (incumbent)	153,264	78.84	
Republican	Randall "Randy" McDonnell	35,309	18.16	
Libertarian	Wayne Parker	3,002	1.54	
Reform	Katie Perrone	2,820	1.45	
Turnout		194,395		
Majority		117,955	60.68	

== List of members representing the district ==
Member	Party	Years	Cong ress	Electoral history
District created March 4, 1855
John A. Quitman (Natchez)	Democratic	March 4, 1855 – July 17, 1858	34th 35th	Elected in 1855. Re-elected in 1857. Died.
Vacant		July 17, 1858 – December 7, 1858	35th	
John Jones McRae (State Line)	Democratic	December 7, 1858 – January 12, 1861	35th 36th	Elected to finish Quitman's term. Re-elected in 1859. Withdrew due to Civil War.
Vacant		January 12, 1861 – February 23, 1870	36th 37th 38th 39th 40th 41st	Civil War and Reconstruction
Legrand Winfield Perce (Natchez)	Republican	February 23, 1870 – March 3, 1873	41st 42nd	Elected in 1869 to finish the term and to the next term. Retired.
George Colin McKee (Vicksburg)	Republican	March 4, 1873 – March 3, 1875	43rd	Redistricted from the 4th district and re-elected in 1872. Retired.
Charles E. Hooker (Jackson)	Democratic	March 4, 1875 – March 3, 1883	44th 45th 46th 47th	Elected in 1874. Re-elected in 1876. Re-elected in 1878. Re-elected in 1880. Retired.
Otho Robards Singleton (Forest)	Democratic	March 4, 1883 – March 3, 1887	48th 49th	Redistricted from the 4th district and re-elected in 1882. Re-elected in 1884. Retired.
Chapman L. Anderson (Kosciusko)	Democratic	March 4, 1887 – March 3, 1891	50th 51st	Elected in 1886. Re-elected in 1888. Lost renomination.
Joseph Henry Beeman (Eley)	Democratic	March 4, 1891 – March 3, 1893	52nd	Elected in 1890. Retired.
John Sharp Williams (Yazoo City)	Democratic	March 4, 1893 – March 3, 1903	53rd 54th 55th 56th 57th	Elected in 1892. Re-elected in 1894. Re-elected in 1896. Re-elected in 1898. Re-elected in 1900. Redistricted to the 8th district.
Adam M. Byrd (Philadelphia)	Democratic	March 4, 1903 – March 3, 1911	58th 59th 60th 61st	Elected in 1902. Re-elected in 1904. Re-elected in 1906. Re-elected in 1908. Lost renomination.
Samuel Andrew Witherspoon (Meridian)	Democratic	March 4, 1911 – November 24, 1915	62nd 63rd 64th	Elected in 1910. Re-elected in 1912. Re-elected in 1914. Died.
Vacant		November 24, 1915 – January 4, 1916	64th	
William Webb Venable (Meridian)	Democratic	January 4, 1916 – March 3, 1921	64th 65th 66th	Elected to finish Witherspoon's term. Re-elected in 1916. Re-elected in 1918. Lost renomination.
Ross A. Collins (Meridian)	Democratic	March 4, 1921 – January 3, 1935	67th 68th 69th 70th 71st 72nd 73rd	Elected in 1920. Re-elected in 1922. Re-elected in 1924. Re-elected in 1926. Re-elected in 1928. Re-elected in 1930. Re-elected in 1932. Retired to run for U.S. senator.
Aubert C. Dunn (Meridian)	Democratic	January 3, 1935 – January 3, 1937	74th	Elected in 1934. Retired.
Ross A. Collins (Meridian)	Democratic	January 3, 1937 – January 3, 1943	75th 76th 77th	Elected in 1936. Re-elected in 1938. Re-elected in 1940. Retired to run for U.S. senator.
W. Arthur Winstead (Philadelphia)	Democratic	January 3, 1943 – January 3, 1963	78th 79th 80th 81st 82nd 83rd 84th 85th 86th 87th	Elected in 1942. Re-elected in 1944. Re-elected in 1946. Re-elected in 1948. Re-elected in 1950. Re-elected in 1952. Re-elected in 1954. Re-elected in 1956. Re-elected in 1958. Re-elected in 1960. Redistricted to the 4th district.
William M. Colmer (Pascagoula)	Democratic	January 3, 1963 – January 3, 1973	88th 89th 90th 91st 92nd	Redistricted from the 6th district and re-elected in 1962. Re-elected in 1964. Re-elected in 1966. Re-elected in 1968. Re-elected in 1970. Retired.
Trent Lott (Pascagoula)	Republican	January 3, 1973 – January 3, 1989	93rd 94th 95th 96th 97th 98th 99th 100th	Elected in 1972. Re-elected in 1974. Re-elected in 1976. Re-elected in 1978. Re-elected in 1980. Re-elected in 1982. Re-elected in 1984. Re-elected in 1986. Retired to run for U.S. senator.
Larkin I. Smith (Long Beach)	Republican	January 3, 1989 – August 13, 1989	101st	Elected in 1988. Died in plane crash.
Vacant		August 13, 1989 – October 17, 1989	101st	
Gene Taylor (Bay St. Louis)	Democratic	October 17, 1989 – January 3, 2003	101st 102nd 103rd 104th 105th 106th 107th	Elected to finish Smith's term. Re-elected in 1990. Re-elected in 1992. Re-elected in 1994. Re-elected in 1996. Re-elected in 1998. Re-elected in 2000. Redistricted to the 4th district.
District eliminated January 3, 2003
