= David Glenn =

David Glenn may refer to:

- David Glenn (pioneer)
- David Glenn (garden designer)
- David Glenn (footballer)
- David C. Glenn, Attorney General of Mississippi
