= 1958 United States House of Representatives elections in Mississippi =

- November 4, 1958

All 6 Mississippi seats to the United States House of Representatives
	Majority party
Party	Democratic
Last election	6
Seats won	6
Seat change	Steady
Popular vote	61,464
Percentage	100%
Election results by district
Democratic
100%

The 1958 United States House of Representatives elections in Mississippi were held on November 4, 1958, to elect the six U.S. representatives from the state of Mississippi, one from each of the state's six congressional districts. The elections coincided with the United States Senate election. Primary elections were held August 26.

All six Democratic nominees were elected unopposed in the general election, with two facing primary elections.

== General election ==
In 4 of the 6 congressional districts, only one candidate filed to run for the Democratic primary, so primaries were not held in those districts. As no independent or Republican candidate filed to run in the entire state, every Democratic nominee for the general election was elected unopposed.

1958 United States House of Representatives election in Mississippi
District	Party	Nominee	Votes
1st	Democratic	Thomas Abernethy	12,413
2nd	Democratic	Jamie Whitten	7,982
3rd	Democratic	Frank Ellis Smith	4,644
4th	Democratic	John Bell Williams	8,665
5th	Democratic	W. Arthur Winstead	14,517
6th	Democratic	William M. Colmer	13,243

== District 5 Democratic primary ==
District 5 Democratic primary results by county: Winstead: 60–70%; 70–80%; 80–90%

=== Candidates ===
==== Nominee ====
- Arthur Winstead, incumbent U.S. Representative

==== Eliminated in primary ====
- Charles P. Mosby Jr.
- Ance Blakeney

=== Results ===
Democratic primary results
Party	Candidate	Votes	%
Democratic	Arthur Winstead	23,137	79.46
Democratic	Charles P. Mosby Jr.	5,169	17.75
Democratic	Ance Blakeney	813	2.79
Total votes		29,119	100.0

== District 6 Democratic primary ==
District 5 Democratic primary results by county: Colmer: 50–60%; 60–70%; 70–80%; Holleman: 70–80%

=== Candidates ===
==== Nominee ====
- William M. Colmer, incumbent U.S. Representative

==== Eliminated in primary ====
- Boyce Holleman, Mississippi Gulf Coast district attorney
- Bill Davis
- Wayne L. McClure

=== Results ===
Democratic primary results
Party	Candidate	Votes	%
Democratic	William M. Colmer	32,805	63.12
Democratic	Boyce Holleman	18,531	35.66
Democratic	Bill Davis	412	0.79
Democratic	Wayne L. McClure	221	0.43
Total votes		51,969	100.0
