= Murder of Marsh Cook =

- Location: 32°0′45.72″N 89°17′16.13″W; Jasper County, Mississippi
- Date: 1890
- Target: Marsh Cook
- Attack type: Murder by shooting
- Weapon: Guns
- Victim: Marsh Cook
- Perpetrator: White supremacists
- Assailant: 6

F. M. B. "Marsh" Cook was a political candidate in Mississippi who was murdered by white supremacists for campaigning for a seat at Mississippi's 1890 Constitutional Convention. A white Republican, he was campaigning in Jasper County, Mississippi. He was ambushed by six men and shot 27 times. A historical marker commemorates his death.

== History ==
=== Congress election campaign ===
Cook was an 1888 Republican candidate for a seat in the U.S. Congress. Democrats had retaken control of Mississippi after the Reconstruction era. "Our chief duty when we meet in Convention is to devise such measures...as will enable us to maintain a home government, under the control of the white people of the State."

Cook contested his election loss to Chapman L. Anderson. Anderson recorded about five times as many votes as Cook in the November 1889 election.

=== Mississippi Constitutional Convention ===
Mississippi's 1890 Constitutional Convention was organized to disenfranchise African American voters. Cook campaigned for a seat on the position that he would oppose attempts to limit Black voting rights. He also encouraged Black people to organize against the discrimination. Democrats threatened him after his two public speeches.

== Attack ==
On July 23, 1890, Cook was assassinated as he approached a log schoolhouse in a rural area near Mount Zion Church. His body was found hours later by a woman.

== Aftermath ==
Cook's murder received national news coverage. Some editorials blamed Cook for his "incendiary" speeches. The Jackson Daily Clarion-Ledger wrote, "Cook was slain because of his inflammatory speeches and efforts to stir up strife and bad blood between the races." In another article, the Clarion-Ledger said, "The Clarion-Ledger regrets the manner of his killing as assassinations cannot be condoned at any time. Yet the people of Jasper are to be congratulated that they will not be further annoyed by Marsh Cook." The Pascagoula Democrat Star called Cook a "scalawag". Terre Haute Daily News wrote that Cook "had the reputation of being a turbulent spirit in the community, and his chief desire seemed to be to antagonize and engender all the race prejudices possible." The Grenada Sentinel wrote, "While we have the utmost detestation for such characters as Marsh Cook, we have a greater of assassination."

Other editorials reacted to claims that it was not a "political" murder; the Eau Claire Free Press Weekly wrote, "Yet we all know, and those who are honest admit, that such murders are political. The murderers are always democrats... But it is a way of giving the public notice that freedom of speech is not tolerated in democratic Mississippi." Cook's brother, Dr. J.H. Cook, denied that the speeches were incendiary and claimed it was a political murder. The Davenport Morning Tribune reported, "The Memphis Avalanche agrees that Marsh Cook was murdered because he was brave enough to publicly proclaim his convictions. Those whom Mr. Cook opposed, were not able to keep him quite [sic] so they killed him."

Governor John Marshall Stone offered a $500 reward for apprehending the perpetrators. No one was ever prosecuted for it.

The convention moved forward in August with a state constitution that included tactics to disenfranchise Black voters, including literacy tests and poll taxes. This became known as the Mississippi Plan and other Southern states followed by rewriting their state constitutions with similar disenfranchisement clauses. Mississippi adopted its constitution on November 1, 1890 and it went into effect immediately, rather than being ratified by the voters.
