= Otho R. Singleton =

American politician (1814–1889)

Otho Singleton
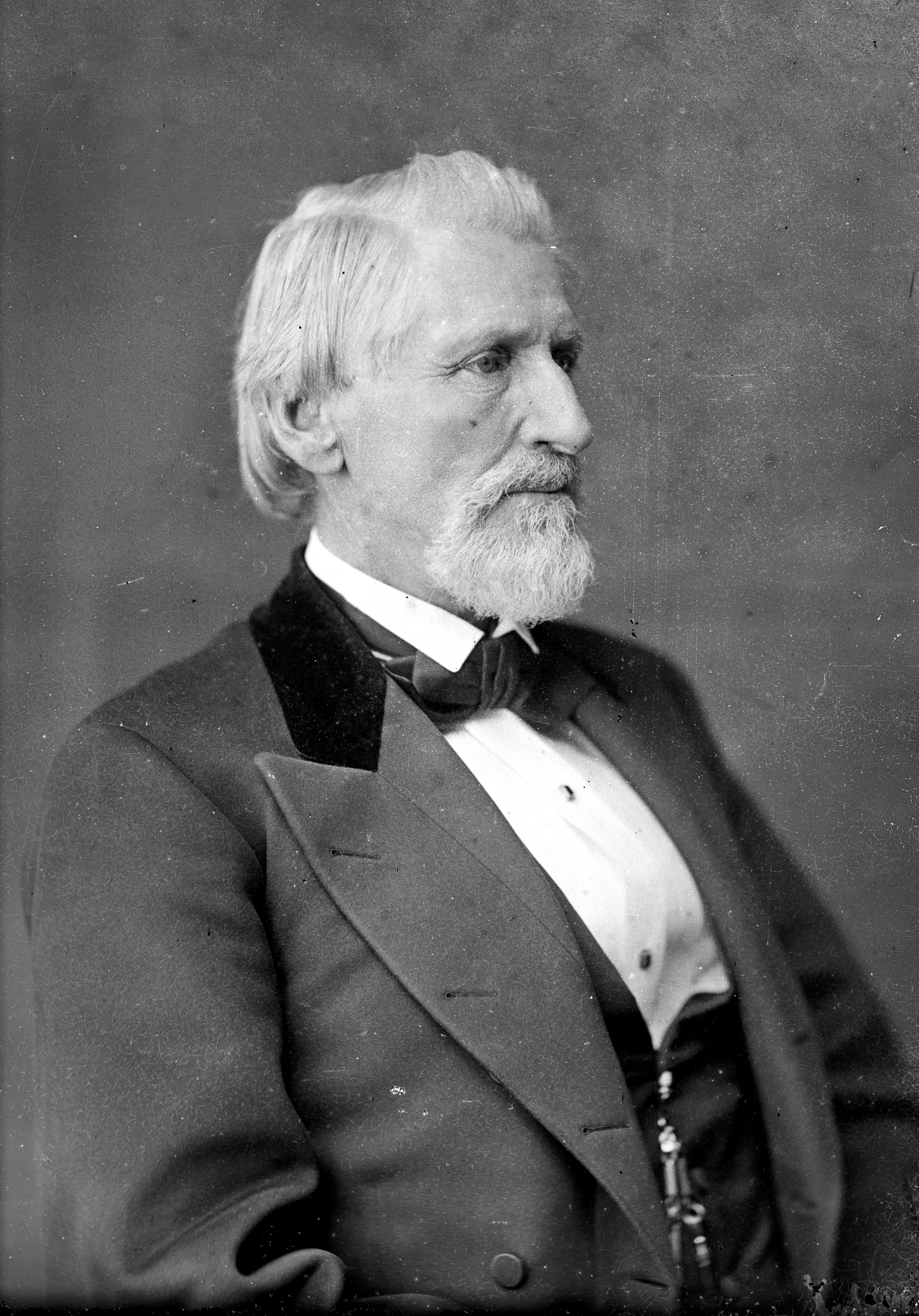

Member of the U.S. House of Representatives from Mississippi
- In office March 4, 1853 – March 4, 1855
- Preceded by: John D. Freeman
- Succeeded by: William Barksdale
- Constituency: 3rd district

Member of the U.S. House of Representatives from Mississippi
- In office March 4, 1857 – January 21, 1861
- Preceded by: William A. Lake
- Succeeded by: Vacant
- Constituency: 4th district

Member of the Confederate House of Representatives for Mississippi
- In office February 18, 1862 – March 18, 1865
- Preceded by: Office established
- Succeeded by: Office abolished

Member of the U.S. House of Representatives from Mississippi
- In office March 4, 1875 – March 4, 1887
- Preceded by: Jason Niles (4th); Charles E. Hooker (5th)
- Succeeded by: Hernando D. Money (4th); Chapman L. Anderson (5th)
- Constituency: 4th district (1875-83); 5th district (1883-87)

Personal details
- Born: October 14, 1814 Nicholasville, Kentucky, United States
- Died: January 11, 1889 (aged 74) Washington, D.C.
- Party: Democratic
- Profession: Attorney, politician

Military service
- Allegiance: Confederate States of America
- Branch/service: Confederate States Army
- Years of service: 1861
- Rank: Captain
- Unit: 18th Mississippi Infantry Regiment
- Battles/wars: American Civil War

Otho Robards Singleton (October 14, 1814 – January 11, 1889) was a U.S. representative from Mississippi and a member of the Confederate States Congress during the American Civil War.

== Biography ==
Born near Nicholasville, Kentucky, he was the son of Lewis Singleton, a hemp manufacturer who owned a factory near Keene, Kentucky. Lewis's father, and Otho's grandfather, was Louis Singleton, a Jessamine County sheriff and Kentucky state senator.

Singleton graduated from St. Joseph's College, Bardstown, Kentucky, and from the law school of Transylvania University. He was admitted to the bar in 1838 and commenced practice in Canton, Mississippi. He served as member of the State house of representatives in 1846 and 1847, and in the state senate 1848–1854 representing Madison and Scott counties.

=== Congress ===
Singleton was elected as a Democrat member of the United States House of Representatives during the Thirty-third Congress (March 4, 1853 – March 3, 1855). He was an unsuccessful candidate for reelection in 1854, but ran again in 1856 and was elected to the Thirty-fifth and Thirty-sixth Congresses, serving from March 4, 1857, until January 12, 1861, when he withdrew following Mississippi's secession from the Union.

=== Confederate Congress ===
At the outbreak of the American Civil War, Singleton enlisted in the Confederate army as the captain of Company C in the 18th Mississippi Infantry Regiment. He left the army after being elected as a representative from Mississippi in the First Confederate Congress. He chaired the Committee on Indian Affairs and won reelection to the Second Confederate Congress, but was often absent from legislative sessions for reasons that are not documented.

=== Return to U.S. Congress ===
After the war, Singleton returned to the US House of Representatives as a Democrat to the Forty-fourth and to the five succeeding Congresses (March 4, 1875 – March 3, 1887).

=== Death and burial ===
He died in Washington, D.C., January 11, 1889. He was interred in Canton Cemetery, Canton, Mississippi.

== Personal life ==
Singleton married; his wife predeceased him. His son, Dr. Richard H. Singleton (born May 9, 1844) was a prominent doctor in Louisville, Kentucky, and a member of the Indiana, Kentucky, and Mississippi medical societies. His daughter, Kate, married Junius M. Smith and lived in North Carolina.

U.S. House of Representatives
| Preceded by John D. Freeman | Member of the U.S. House of Representatives from Mississippi's 3rd congressional district 1853–1855 | Succeeded by William Barksdale |
| Preceded by William A. Lake | Member of the U.S. House of Representatives from Mississippi's 4th congressional district 1857–1861 | Succeeded by George C. McKee |
| Preceded by Jason Niles | Member of the U.S. House of Representatives from Mississippi's 4th congressional district 1875–1883 | Succeeded by Hernando D. Money |
| Preceded by Charles E. Hooker | Member of the U.S. House of Representatives from Mississippi's 5th congressional district 1883–1887 | Succeeded by Chapman L. Anderson |
