= Frank Roberson =

American politician (1882–1961)

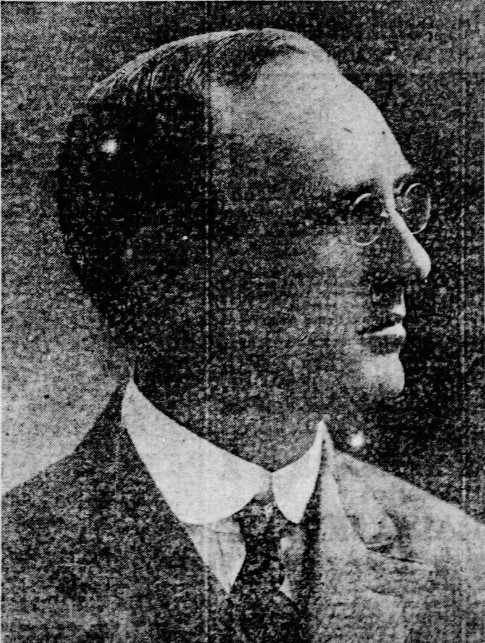
- Roberson c. 1919

Attorney General of Mississippi
- In office January 1920 – 1923
- Governor: Lee M. Russell
- Preceded by: Ross A. Collins
- Succeeded by: Clayton D. Potter

Assistant Attorney General of Mississippi
- In office February 1917 – January 1920

Member of the Mississippi House of Representatives from the Pontotoc County district
- In office January 1916 – February 1917

Personal details
- Born: April 30, 1882 Pontotoc County, MS
- Died: November 1961 (aged 79) Washington, DC
- Party: Democrat

Frank Roberson (April 30, 1882 - November 1961) was an American Democratic politician. He was the Attorney General of Mississippi from 1920 to 1923.

== Early life ==
Frank Roberson was born on April 30, 1882, in Cherry Creek, Pontotoc County, Mississippi. He was the son of William Marion Roberson and Pink (Bell) Roberson. He graduated from the University of Mississippi in 1901 with a bachelor's degree in philosophy. He then taught in the Philippines from 1901 to 1904. He graduated from the University of Mississippi Law School in 1905. He moved to Pontotoc, Mississippi, in 1906.

== Political career ==
From 1908 to 1912, he was the Secretary of the Mississippi Senate. From 1910 to 1914, he was the City Attorney of Pontotoc. He was elected to represent Pontotoc County as a Democrat in the Mississippi House of Representatives in 1915 and served in the 1916 session. He resigned from the position in February 1917, when he was appointed as the Assistant Attorney General of Mississippi. In 1919, he was elected Attorney General of Mississippi, defeating Earl N. Floyd in the Democratic primary. He served in the position from January 1920 to 1923. Roberson died in November 1961 at his home in Washington, D. C.
