= John D. Freeman =

American politician

Attorney General of Mississippi
- In office 1841–1850
- Preceded by: T.F. Collins
- Succeeded by: David C. Glenn

Member of the U.S. House of Representatives from Mississippi's 3rd district
- In office March 4, 1851 – March 3, 1853
- Preceded by: William McWillie
- Succeeded by: Otho R. Singleton

Personal details
- Born: 1817 Cooperstown, New York, U.S.
- Died: January 17, 1886 Canon City, Colorado, U.S.
- Resting place: Jackson, Mississippi
- Party: Democratic
- Other political affiliations: Union

John D. Freeman (1817 – January 17, 1886) was a U.S. Representative from Mississippi.

Born in 1817 in Cooperstown, New York, Freeman attended the common schools. He moved to Mississippi and located in Grand Gulf. He studied law. He was admitted to the bar and practiced. He served as district attorney. He moved to Natchez, Mississippi. Attorney general of Mississippi from 1841 to 1851. He was author of the first volume of reports of decisions of the Chancery Court of Mississippi published in 1844.

Freeman was elected as a Unionist to the Thirty-second Congress (March 4, 1851 - March 3, 1853). He served as attorney general. He argued Mitchell v. Wells, a case questioning whether a man could leave property to his daughter, who had been born one of his slaves. The father freed his daughter, Nancy Wells, and then tried to leave property to her. The Mississippi Supreme Court rejected his will. Later Freeman served as member of the Democratic State central committee and served as chairman. He moved to Colorado and settled in Canon City in 1882. He resumed the practice of his profession. He died in Canon City, Colorado, on January 17, 1886, and was interred in Jackson, Mississippi.

Political offices
Preceded by T.F. Collins	Mississippi Attorney General; 1841–1850	Succeeded by David C. Glenn
U.S. House of Representatives
Preceded by William McWillie	Member of the U.S. House of Representatives from Mississippi's 3rd congressional district 1851–1853	Succeeded by Otho R. Singleton
