= Chapman L. Anderson =

American politician (1845–1924)

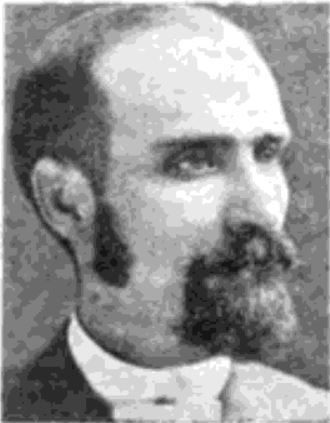

Member of the U.S. House of Representatives from Mississippi's 4th district
- In office March 4, 1887 – March 3, 1891
- Preceded by: Otho R. Singleton
- Succeeded by: Joseph H. Beeman

Member of the Mississippi House of Representatives
- In office January 1880 – January 1882

Personal details
- Born: Chapman Levy Anderson; March 15, 1845 Noxubee County, Mississippi. U.S.
- Died: April 27, 1924 (aged 79)
- Resting place: Kosciusko Cemetery
- Party: Democratic

Military service
- Allegiance: Confederate States of America
- Branch/service: Confederate States Army
- Rank: Second lieutenant
- Unit: 39th Mississippi Infantry Regiment
- Battles/wars: American Civil War

Chapman Levy Anderson (March 15, 1845 – April 27, 1924) was an American lawyer and politician who served two terms as a U.S. representative from Mississippi, from 1887 to 1891. A Confederate Army veteran, he was a member of the Democratic Party.

== Biography ==
Anderson was born near Macon, Mississippi, on March 15, 1845. He attended the common schools in Jackson, Mississippi.

=== Family ===
He was the son of Thomas Salmond Anderson (born 1819) and his wife, Flora E. (Levy) Anderson (born 1823). He was related to Chapman Levy. Chapman Anderson's eldest brother, Edward Henry Anderson, served in the Confederate Army and died at the First Battle of Bull Run in 1861.

=== Civil War ===
In 1861, he enlisted in the Confederate States Army on March 5, 1862, as a private in the 39th Mississippi Infantry Regiment. He was promoted through the successive grades of noncommissioned officer until July 1864, when he was transferred to Bradford's cavalry corps of scouts with the rank of second lieutenant, in which capacity he served until the close of the war.

=== Early career ===
In January 1866, he entered the University of Mississippi, and studied a partial course in law and literature until the summer of 1867. He was then admitted to the bar on February 14, 1868.

He commenced practice in Kosciusko, Mississippi. He served as mayor of Kosciusko in 1875. He served as member of the Mississippi House of Representatives in 1879 and 1880.

=== Congress ===
Anderson was elected as a Democrat to the Fiftieth and Fifty-first Congresses (March 4, 1887 – March 3, 1891). Anderson's 1888 Republican opponent, Marsh Cook, unsuccessfully contested the election results. Anderson was an unsuccessful candidate for renomination in 1890.

Later, in 1890, Cook was ambushed and murdered by a gang of white supremacists while campaigning to be a delegate at Mississippi's 1890 Constitutional Convention.

=== Later career and death ===
Anderson served as United States district attorney for the northern district of Mississippi in 1896 and 1897.

He worked at his law office in Kosciusko, Mississippi until his death on April 27, 1924. He was interred in Kosciusko Cemetery.

== Personal life ==
Anderson was an Episcopalian. He married Nancy Cunningham Johnson of Kirkwood, Madison County, Mississippi, on December 22, 1870. He had three children: Jenny Flora; Chapman Levy, who died on September 25, 1883; and Mary Ellen, who married lawyer James E. Teat on June 22, 1904.

== Sources ==
- United States Congress. "Chapman L. Anderson (id: A000183)". Biographical Directory of the United States Congress.

U.S. House of Representatives
Preceded by Otho R. Singleton	Member of the U.S. House of Representatives from Mississippi's 4th congressional district 1887–1891	Succeeded by Joseph H. Beeman
