= Aubert C. Dunn =

American politician (1896–1987)

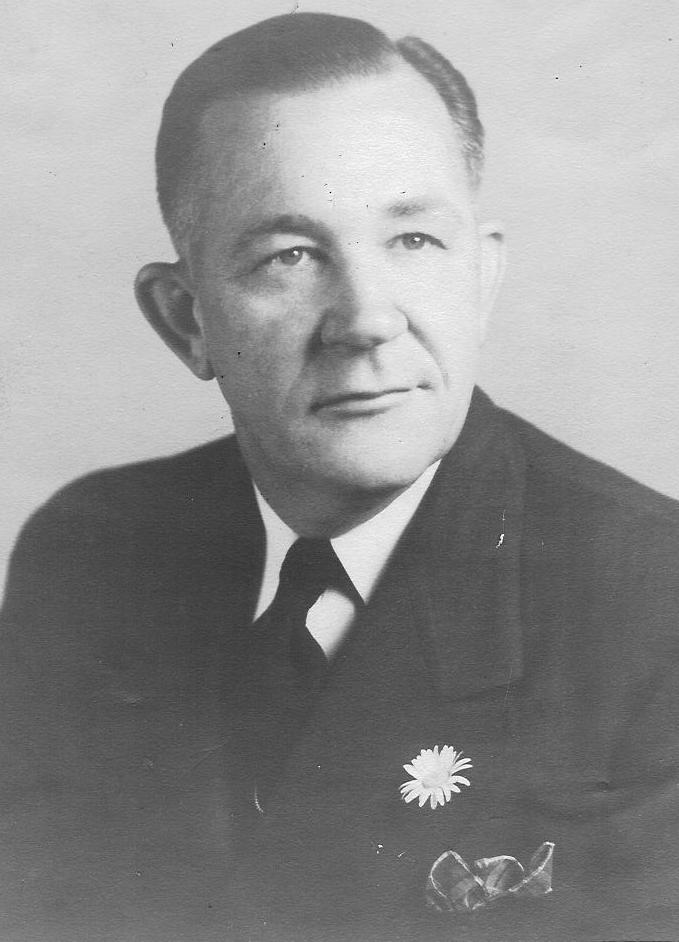
- Family photo provided by Winfield Dunn

Member of the U.S. House of Representatives from Mississippi's 5th district
- In office January 3, 1935 – January 3, 1937
- Preceded by: Ross A. Collins
- Succeeded by: Ross A. Collins

Personal details
- Born: Aubert Culberson Dunn; November 20, 1896 Meridian, Mississippi, U.S
- Died: January 4, 1987 (aged 90) Mobile, Alabama, U.S.
- Resting place: Magnolia Cemetery, Meridian, Mississippi
- Party: Democratic
- Spouse: Dorothy Donn Crum (m. 1922; died 1973)
- Children: 3 (including Winfield Dunn)
- Education: University of Mississippi; University of Alabama
- Occupation: Newspaper reporter Attorney

Aubert Culberson Dunn (November 20, 1896 – January 4, 1987) was an attorney and politician from Mississippi. A Democrat, he was most notable for his service as a member of the United States House of Representatives for one term (1935–1937).

A native of Meridian, Mississippi, Dunn attended the University of Mississippi, the University of Alabama, and Southwestern Baptist Theological Seminary, and worked as a reporter for The Cincinnati Enquirer. He served in the United States Navy during World War I, studied law, and was admitted to the bar in 1924.

Dunn served as District Attorney for Mississippi's 10th Judicial District (1931 to 1934), and resigned to accept his seat in Congress. In 1934, he was the successful Democratic nominee for Mississippi's 5th District seat, and he served one term, January 3, 1935 – January 3, 1937. He did not run for reelection in 1936, and resumed practicing law.

He was a technical expert for the United States Senate Committee on Finance in 1938, and counsel for the Social Security Board in 1939. From 1952 to 1953, Dunn was a special trial attorney in the U.S. Attorney General's office, and in 1966 he served as Judge of Mississippi's 10th Judicial District. In retirement, Dunn resided in Mobile, Alabama, where he died in 1987. He was buried at Magnolia Cemetery in Mobile.

== Biography ==
Born in Meridian, Mississippi, Dunn attended the public schools, the University of Mississippi, the University of Alabama, and Southwestern Baptist Theological Seminary. In 1917 he became a reporter for The Cincinnati Enquirer. He was a United States Navy veteran of World War I, and served from his enlistment on December 7, 1917, to his discharge on June 16, 1919.

He studied law, was admitted to the bar in 1924 and commenced practice in Meridian, Mississippi. He served as District Attorney for the 10th Judicial District of Mississippi from 1931 to 1934.

Dunn was elected as a Democrat to the Seventy-fourth Congress (January 3, 1935, to January 3, 1937). He was not a candidate for renomination in 1936. He served a technical expert for the United States Senate Committee on Finance in 1938 and as attorney for the Social Security Board in 1939.

After leaving the House, Dunn resumed the practice of law. He served as special trial attorney in the U.S. Attorney General's office from 1952 to 1953. In 1966 he served as Circuit Judge for the Tenth Judicial District of Mississippi.

== Death and burial ==
In retirement, Dunn was a resident of Mobile, Alabama, where he died on January 4, 1987. He was interred at Magnolia Cemetery in Meridian, Mississippi.

== Family ==
In 1922, Dunn married Dorothy Donn Crum. They were married until her death in 1973, and were the parents of three children – Ann, Deon, and Winfield. Winfield Dunn served as Governor of Tennessee from 1971 to 1975.

== Sources ==
=== Newspapers ===
- "Wedding Announcement, Dorothy Donn Crum and Aubert C. Dunn". El Paso Herald. El Paso, TX. November 16, 1922 – via Newspapers.com.
- "Aubert Dunn New Judge At Meridian". The Clarion-Ledger. Jackson, MS. Associated Press. April 2, 1966 – via Newspapers.com.
- "Death Notice: Aubert C. Dunn". The Clarion-Ledger. Jackson, MS. January 6, 1987 – via Newspapers.com.

=== Books ===
- United States Congress (2005). Biographical Directory of the United States Congress, 1774–2005. Washington, DC: US Government Printing Office. ISBN 978-0-16-073176-1.

U.S. House of Representatives
Preceded by Ross A. Collins	Member of the U.S. House of Representatives from Mississippi's 5th congressional district 1935–1937	Succeeded by Ross A. Collins
