= Adam M. Byrd =

American politician (1859–1912)

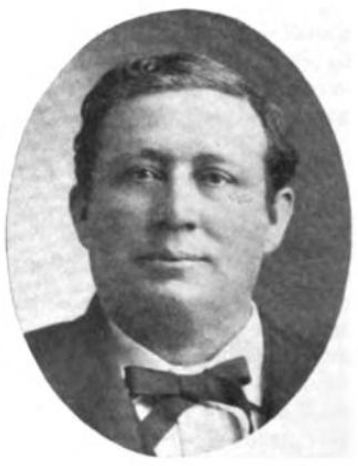

Member of the U.S. House of Representatives from Mississippi's 5th district
- In office March 4, 1903 – March 3, 1911
- Preceded by: John S. Williams
- Succeeded by: Samuel A. Witherspoon

Member of the Mississippi House of Representatives
- In office 1896-1897

Member of the Mississippi Senate
- In office 1889-1896

Personal details
- Born: Adam Monroe Byrd; July 6, 1859 Sumter County, Alabama
- Died: June 21, 1912 (aged 52) Hot Springs, Arkansas
- Party: Democratic
- Education: Cooper Institute; Cumberland School of Law
- Occupation: Lawyer

Adam Monroe Byrd (July 6, 1859 – June 21, 1912) was a U.S. representative from Mississippi.

== Biography ==
Born in Sumter County, Alabama, Byrd moved to Neshoba County, Mississippi. He attended the common schools and Cooper Institute in Daleville, Mississippi. He graduated from the Cumberland School of Law at Cumberland University, Lebanon, Tennessee, in 1884. He was admitted to the bar in 1885 and commenced practice in Philadelphia, Mississippi. He served as superintendent of education for Neshoba County from 1887 to 1889. He served as a member of the State senate from 1889 to 1896. He served in the State house of representatives in 1896 and 1897, when he resigned. He served as prosecuting attorney for the tenth judicial district in 1897. He served as judge of the sixth chancery district from 1897 until his resignation in 1903.

Byrd was elected as a Democrat to the Fifty-eighth and to the three succeeding Congresses (March 4, 1903 – March 3, 1911). He was an unsuccessful candidate for renomination in 1910. After his time in Congress, he resumed the practice of law in Philadelphia, Mississippi. He died at Hot Springs, Arkansas on June 21, 1912. He was interred in Town Cemetery in Philadelphia, Mississippi.

U.S. House of Representatives
Preceded by John S. Williams	Member of the U.S. House of Representatives from Mississippi's 5th congressional district 1903–1911	Succeeded by Samuel A. Witherspoon
