= Legrand W. Perce =

American politician

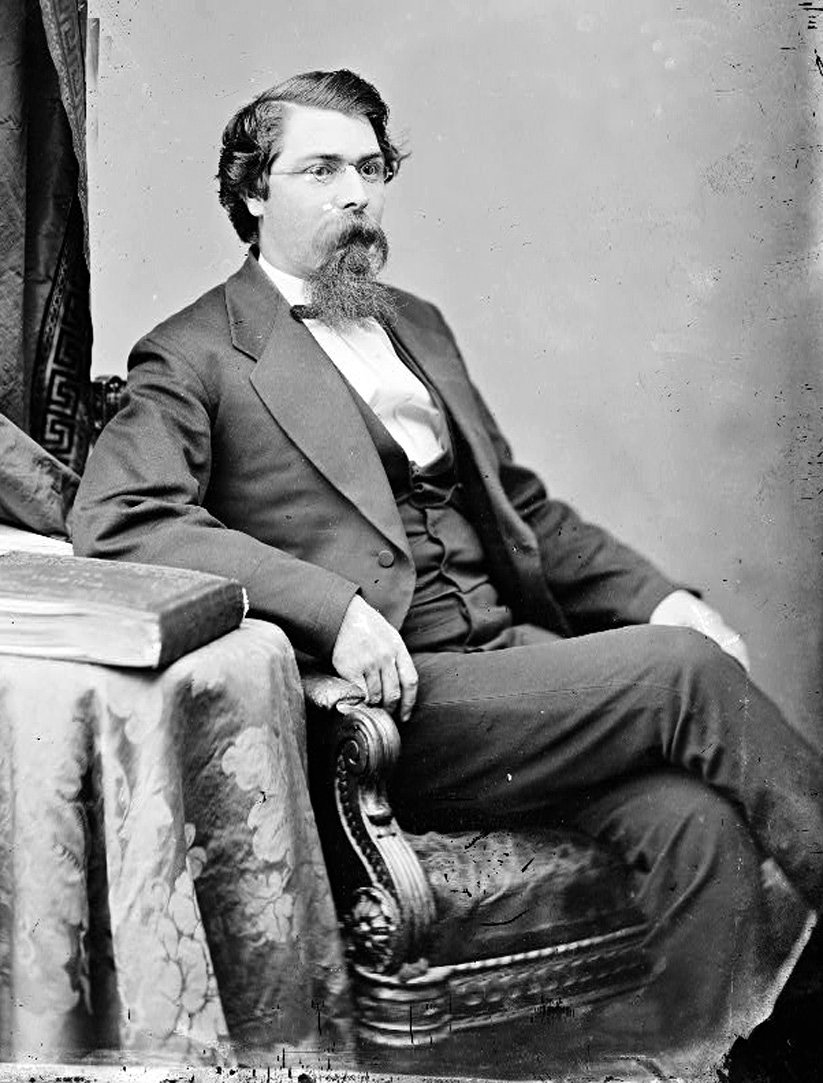

Member of the U.S. House of Representatives from Mississippi's 5th district
- In office February 23, 1870 – March 3, 1873
- Preceded by: John J. McRae
- Succeeded by: George C. McKee

Personal details
- Born: Legrand Winfield Perce; June 19, 1836 Buffalo, New York, U.S.
- Died: March 16, 1911 (aged 74) Chicago, Illinois, U.S.
- Resting place: Rosehill Cemetery, Chicago, Illinois, U.S.
- Party: Republican
- Education: Genesee College; Albany Law School
- Profession: Politician, lawyer

Legrand (or Le Grand) Winfield Perce (June 19, 1836 – March 16, 1911) was a U.S. representative from Mississippi.

Born in Buffalo, New York, Perce completed preparatory studies. He attended Genesee College in Lima, New York, and graduated from Albany Law School in 1857. He was admitted to the bar the same year and commenced practice in Buffalo, New York. In 1859, he travelled to St. Louis, Missouri intending to live there, but he decided that, due to his anti-slavery views, he could never live in a slave state and instead settled in Chicago, Illinois. At the outbreak of the Civil War, he volunteered his services to Governor Yates of Illinois and served for 4 months on General Prentiss's staff in Cairo, Illinois, with the rank of captain. In August 1861, he accepted an offer to join the Sixth Regiment, Michigan Volunteer Infantry and was commissioned a second lieutenant. He was promoted to the rank of captain in June 1862. He was appointed captain in the United States Volunteers in August 1863 and was brevetted lieutenant colonel and colonel in 1865. He settled in Natchez, Mississippi. He was appointed register in bankruptcy in June 1867. Upon readmission of the State of Mississippi to representation, Perce was elected as a Republican to the Forty-first Congress. He was reelected to the Forty-second Congress and served from February 23, 1870, to March 3, 1873. He served as chairman of the Committee on Education and Labor (Forty-second Congress). He was not a candidate for reelection in 1872. He engaged in the practice of law and also in the real estate business at Chicago, Illinois, where he died March 16, 1911. He was interred in Rosehill Cemetery.

== External resources ==
- United States Congress. "Legrand W. Perce (id: P000221)". Biographical Directory of the United States Congress.
- Memorials of Deceased Companions of the Commandery of the State of Illinois, Chicago, 1912, p. 639-44.

U.S. House of Representatives
Preceded by John J. McRae	Member of the U.S. House of Representatives from Mississippi's 5th congressional district 1870–1873	Succeeded by George C. McKee
