= Jason Niles =

American politician

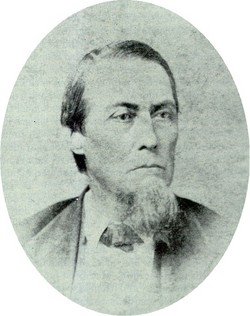

Member of the U.S. House of Representatives from Mississippi's 4th district
- In office March 4, 1873 – March 3, 1875
- Preceded by: George C. McKee
- Succeeded by: Otho R. Singleton

Personal details
- Born: Jason Niles; December 19, 1814 Burlington, Vermont
- Died: July 7, 1894 (aged 79) Kosciusko, Mississippi
- Resting place: Kosciusko's City Cemetery
- Party: Republican
- Spouse: Harriet N. McRee (m. 1847)
- Children: 7 (including Henry Clay Niles)
- Education: University of Vermont
- Profession: Attorney; Newspaper editor

Jason Niles (December 19, 1814 – July 7, 1894) was a lawyer, newspaper editor, and politician in the United States. He served as mayor and for one term as a U.S. representative from Mississippi from 1873 to 1875.

== Biography ==
Niles was born in Burlington, Vermont on December 19, 1814, the son of Daniel Swift Niles and Alice Reed, both natives of New Hampshire. He attended the local schools of Burlington, received a bachelor's degree from the University of Vermont in 1836, and a master's degree in 1846. He taught school in Quebec, Ohio, and Tennessee, and later moved to Mississippi.

While teaching school, Niles studied law; he was admitted to the bar in 1851 and began a practice in Kosciusko. He served as an anti-secession delegate to Mississippi's 1851 constitutional convention.

== Civil War ==
During the American Civil War, Niles was a supporter of the Union; he remained in Mississippi, and worked to keep a low public profile. Though he was a diarist and kept a journal for nearly 30 years beginning in 1831, Niles made no entries for the first two years of the war, presumably to avoid having local Confederates use his writings to prove disloyalty. Niles did not want to serve in the Confederate military, and arranged to have the son of a friend serve in Mississippi's state troops as a substitute. He later ran for mayor, presuming that if he won, his status as an elected official would be exempt from military service. He was elected in May 1864, and served one term.

== Post-Civil War ==
Niles continued his pro-Union politics after the war; he was a delegate to Mississippi's constitutional conventions in 1865 and 1868. He also served in the Mississippi House of Representatives in 1870. In 1871 he was appointed judge of Mississippi's 13th district, and he served until 1872.

In 1872, Niles was elected as a Republican to the 43rd Congress. He served one term, March 4, 1873 to March 3, 1875. With the end of Reconstruction in Mississippi, the Democratic Party returned to power, and Niles was an unsuccessful candidate for reelection in 1874.

From 1876 to 1880, Niles was editor of the Kosciusko Chronicle newspaper. He then returned to the practice of law.

== Death and burial ==
Niles died in Kosciusko, Mississippi, July 7, 1894 and was interred at Kosciusko's City Cemetery.

== Family ==
In 1847, Niles married Harriet N. McRee in Bedford County, Tennessee; she was the daughter of William Elliot McRee and Sarah McLean Houston. Their children included:

- Alice Redd Niles, born March 15, 1848
- Henry Clay Niles, born June 4, 1840
- Sallie Houston Niles, born December 31, 1852
- Mary Niles, born December 30, 1855
- Lucy Niles, born August 30, 1858
- Jennie Niles, born August 13, 1861
- Lydia Niles, born June 19, 1866

Henry Clay Niles served as a federal judge in Mississippi. Jason Niles was the cousin of Thomas Brackett Reed, who served as Speaker of the United States House of Representatives.

== Sources ==
=== Newspapers ===
- "Necrological: Hon. Jason Niles, Kosciusko, Mississippi". The Times-Democrat. New Orleans, LA. July 9, 1894.

=== Internet ===
- "Early Attala Residents: Jason Niles". Attala County, Mississippi. MS Gen Web. Archived from the original on August 10, 2021.

== External sources ==
- United States Congress. "Jason Niles (id: N000107)". Biographical Directory of the United States Congress.
- Jason Niles at Find a Grave

U.S. House of Representatives
Preceded by George C. McKee	Member of the U.S. House of Representatives from Mississippi's 4th congressional district 1873–1875	Succeeded by Otho R. Singleton
