= 39th Mississippi Infantry Regiment =

19th century confederate infantry unit from Mississippi

- Active: 1862–1865
- Disbanded: May 4, 1865
- Country: Confederate States
- Allegiance: Mississippi
- Branch: Confederate States Army
- Type: Infantry
- Size: Regiment
- Battles: American Civil War: Second Battle of Corinth; Vicksburg Campaign; Siege of Port Hudson; Atlanta Campaign; Franklin-Nashville Campaign; Battle of Fort Blakeley

The 39th Mississippi Infantry Regiment was a unit of the Confederate States Army in the American Civil War. Formed in 1862, the regiment fought in various battles of the Western theater, was captured at Port Hudson, Louisiana in 1863, and surrendered in May, 1865.

== History ==
The 39th Mississippi Infantry was organized at Jackson in May, 1862. Following the Confederate defeat at the Siege of Corinth, the regiment was placed on defensive duties in North Mississippi.

Company I of the regiment took part in the August, 1862 Battle of Baton Rouge, an unsuccessful attempt to capture the Union-held capital of Louisiana. In October the regiment joined a Confederate attempt to retake Corinth. Following this defeat the 39th was sent to defend Port Hudson, Louisiana, which was besieged by Federal troops during the Vicksburg Campaign. The Confederates at Port Hudson surrendered on July 8, 1863 and the regiment was captured, with the men and non-commissioned officers paroled. After being exchanged and returned to service the 39th was sent to Georgia to take part in the Atlanta Campaign. Suffering heavy casualties at Atlanta and in Tennessee during the subsequent Franklin-Nashville Campaign, the regiment retreated to Mississippi at the end of 1864.

During the final stages of the war, the 39th was sent to defend Mobile, Alabama, and was captured following the Union victory at the Battle of Fort Blakeley on April 9, 1865. The regiment was then disbanded at the surrender of Confederate forces in Alabama on May 4.

== Flag ==
The battle flag of the 39th Mississippi was captured by Union troops of the 4th Minnesota at the Battle of Allatoona, Georgia, in October 1864. In 1901 a group of Mississippi veterans requested that the flag be returned to them, but the Union veterans refused despite an appeal from Minnesota Governor Samuel Rinnah Van Sant. In 1905 Governor John Albert Johnson tried to argue that the flag was the property of the state of Minnesota and could thus be returned without the veterans' consent, but the state attorney general ruled the flag was the property of the veterans, not the state. The flag was donated to the Minnesota state historical society and displayed for many years inside Minneapolis City Hall, but was lost following building renovations in the 1970s and has not been recovered.

== Commanders ==
Commanders of the 39th Mississippi Infantry:

- Colonel W.B. Shelby
- Lieutenant Colonel William E. Ross

== Organization ==
Companies of the 39th Mississippi Infantry:

- Company A, "Simpson Greys" of Simpson County
- Company B, "Rankin Rebels" of Rankin County
- Company C, "Johnston Avengers" of Scott County
- Company D, "Newton Hornets" of Newton County
- Company E, "Barry Guards" of Copiah County
- Company F, "Pearl River Guards" of Simpson County
- Company G, "Price Rebels" of Rankin County
- Company H, "Dixie Guards" of Pike County
- Company I, "Burt Avengers" of Hinds County
- Company K, "Monroe Quin Guards" of Pike County

== See also ==
- List of Mississippi Civil War Confederate units
