= 1942 United States Senate election in Mississippi =

1942 U.S. Senate Democratic primary in Mississippi
- September 15, 1942
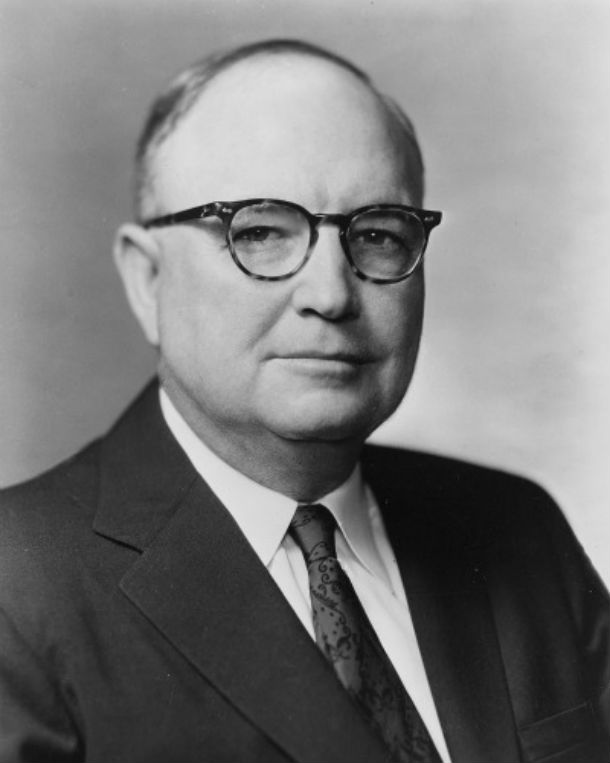

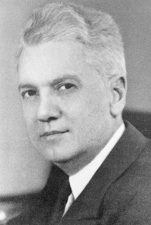
Nominee	James Eastland	Wall Doxey
Party	Democratic	Democratic
Popular vote	74,747	56,748
Percentage	56.84%	43.16%
- County results Eastland: 50–60% 60–70% 70–80% 80–90% >90% Doxey: 50–60% 60–70% 70–80% 80–90% Tie: 50%
U.S. senator before election
Wall Doxey
Democratic
Elected U.S. Senator
James Eastland
Democratic

The 1942 United States Senate election in Mississippi was held on November 3, 1942. Incumbent Democratic U.S. Senator Wall Doxey, who had won a special election the year prior to complete the unexpired term of Pat Harrison, ran for a full term in office. He was defeated by James Eastland who was appointed to and held the seat prior to Doxey's wins.

Because Eastland faced no opposition in the general election, his victory in the September 15 primary was tantamount to election.

This was the last time an incumbent Senator lost re-election in Mississippi until 2026.

== Democratic primary ==
=== Candidates ===
- Ross A. Collins, U.S. Representative from Meridian and candidate for Senate in 1934 and 1941
- Wall Doxey, incumbent Senator since 1941
- James Eastland, former State Representative from Doddsville, Scott County and interim Senator in 1941
- Douglas R. Smith
- Roland Wall

=== Results ===
1942 Democratic U.S. Senate primary
Party	Candidate	Votes	%
Democratic	James Eastland	50,118	37.55%
Democratic	Wall Doxey (incumbent)	37,756	28.29%
Democratic	Ross A. Collins	36,511	27.36%
Democratic	Roland Wall	8,077	6.05%
Democratic	Douglas R. Smith	993	0.74%
Total votes		133,455	100.00%

=== Runoff ===
1942 Democratic U.S. Senate runoff
Party	Candidate	Votes	%
Democratic	James Eastland	74,747	56.84%
Democratic	Wall Doxey (incumbent)	56,748	43.16%
Total votes		131,495	100.00%

== General election ==
=== Results ===
1942 U.S. Senate election in Mississippi
Party	Candidate	Votes	%	±%
Democratic	James Eastland	51,355	100.00%	N/A
Total votes		51,355	100.00%	

== See also ==
- 1942 United States Senate elections
