= John Sharp Williams =

American politician (1854–1932)

John S. Williams
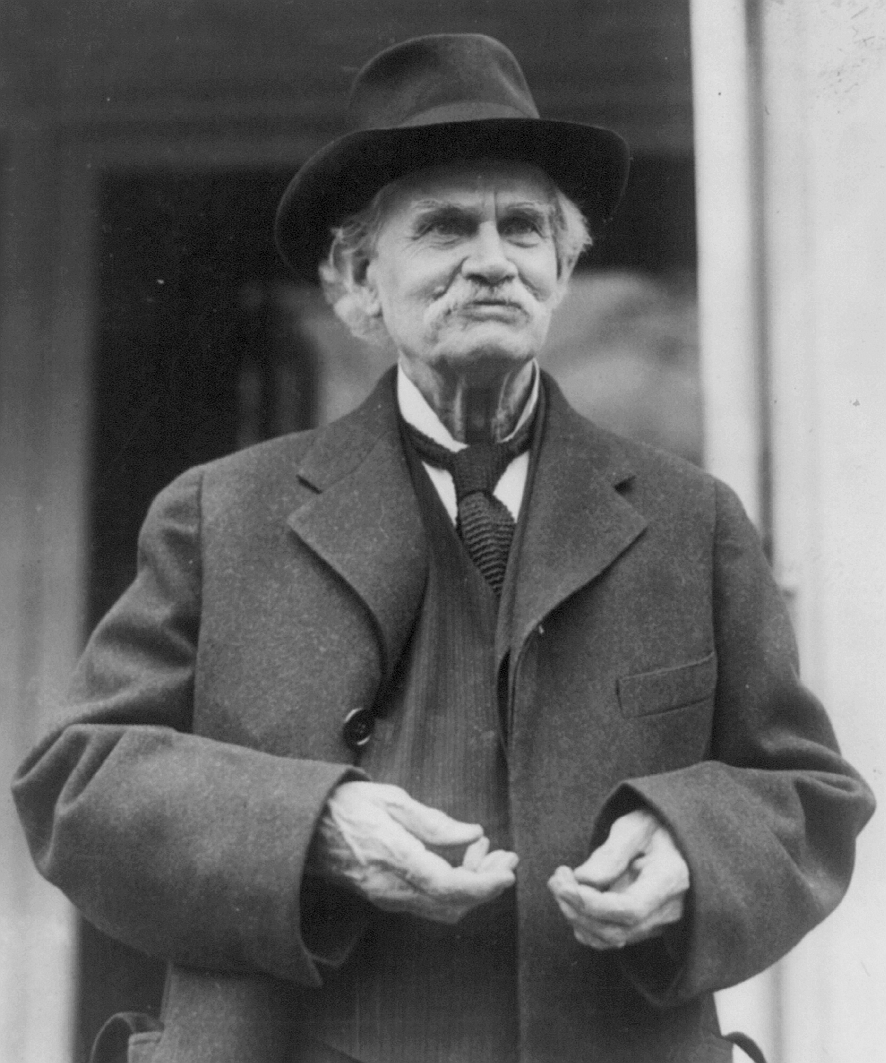
- Williams in 1923

House Minority Leader
- In office March 4, 1903 – March 3, 1909
- Deputy: James Tilghman Lloyd
- Preceded by: James D. Richardson
- Succeeded by: Champ Clark

Leader of the House Democratic Caucus
- In office March 4, 1903 – March 3, 1909
- Preceded by: James D. Richardson
- Succeeded by: Champ Clark

United States Senator from Mississippi
- In office March 4, 1911 – March 3, 1923
- Preceded by: Hernando Money
- Succeeded by: Hubert D. Stephens

Member of the U.S. House of Representatives from Mississippi
- In office March 4, 1893 – March 3, 1909
- Preceded by: Joseph H. Beeman
- Succeeded by: James Collier
- Constituency: 5th district (1893–1903); 8th district (1903–1909)

Personal details
- Born: John Sharp Williams; July 30, 1854 Memphis, Tennessee, U.S.
- Died: September 27, 1932 (aged 78) Yazoo County, Mississippi, U.S.
- Party: Democratic
- Spouse: Elizabeth Dial "Betty" Webb
- Children: 8
- Education: University of the South; University of Virginia, Charlottesville (LLB)

John Sharp Williams (July 30, 1854 – September 27, 1932) was a prominent American politician in the Democratic Party from the 1890s through the 1920s, and served as the minority leader of the United States House of Representatives from 1903 to 1908.

== Early life ==
Williams was born in Memphis, Tennessee, but raised at the Cedar Grove plantation in Benton, Yazoo County, Mississippi. His mother died in his early childhood, and his father was killed fighting for the Confederacy at Shiloh during the Civil War. After graduating from the Kentucky Military Institute in 1870, he studied at the University of the South before transferring to the University of Virginia, Charlottesville, where he was Phi Beta Kappa but did not complete all his science courses for his bachelor's degree. He spent two years in Europe at the University of Heidelberg and what is now the University of Burgundy before returning to the University of Virginia to receive his law degree in 1876. After a brief return to Memphis (where he married Elizabeth Dial Webb in 1877), Williams returned to Yazoo County, where from 1878 to 1893 he ran the family plantation and kept a law practice.

== Political career ==
Elected to the United States House of Representatives in 1893, Williams soon became a leader of the Democratic minority, renowned for his speaking skill and wit. Like most other Southern Democrats of the day, he was a proponent of coining silver and an opponent of high tariffs. In 1906, when Great Britain launched HMS Dreadnought, Williams flippantly proposed that the name of an American battleship being built in response at the urging of Theodore Roosevelt be changed from Michigan to Skeered o' Nothin' and that the ship's first mission be to challenge Dreadnought to a duel off the coast of Long Island, Roosevelt's home, with Roosevelt and most of his cabinet on deck.

During his time as ranking Democrat in the Republican-controlled House, Williams was given the privilege of choosing the Democrats assigned to committees by the House Speaker Joseph Gurney Cannon (by the rules of the House, Cannon was entitled to make all appointments himself), giving him tremendous power within the minority party. In gratitude, Williams was known to omit Democrats whom Cannon found particularly objectionable from committee assignments. Recognizing his status vis-à-vis Cannon, Williams jokingly described his relative political impotence in the Cannon-dominated Committee on Rules, "I am invited to the seances but I am never consulted about the spiritualistic appearances."

By beating one of Mississippi's leading racebaiters, James K. Vardaman, Williams moved to the United States Senate in 1911 after an early election on 21 January 1908. He became one of Woodrow Wilson's strongest supporters, from Wilson's nomination for the Presidency in 1912 to the losing battle to ratify American participation in the League of Nations in 1920. During his time as a senator, he also served as a chairman of the Committee to Establish a University of the United States.

He made a notorious denunciation of the black race when he declared on December 20, 1898: "You could ship-wreck 10,000 illiterate white Americans on a desert island, and in three weeks they would have a fairly good government, conceived and administered upon fairly democratic lines. You could ship-wreck 10,000 negroes, every one of whom was a graduate of Harvard University, and in less than three years, they would have retrograded governmentally; half of the men would have been killed, and the other half would have two wives apiece."

After retiring from the Senate in 1923, Williams returned to his family plantation, Cedar Grove Plantation in Yazoo County, Mississippi, where he spent the last decade of his life, dying in late 1932.

U.S. House of Representatives
Preceded by Joseph H. Beeman	Member of the U.S. House of Representatives from Mississippi's 5th congressional district March 4, 1893 – March 3, 1903	Succeeded by Adam M. Byrd
Preceded by New district	Member of the U.S. House of Representatives from Mississippi's 8th congressional district March 4, 1903 – March 3, 1909	Succeeded by James Collier
Preceded by James D. Richardson	House Minority Leader; 1903–1908	Succeeded by Champ Clark
Preceded by James D. Richardson	House Democratic Leader; 1903–1909	Succeeded by Champ Clark
Party political offices
Preceded by Charles S. Thomas	Keynote Speaker of the Democratic National Convention; 1904	Succeeded by Theodore Bell
U.S. Senate
Preceded by Hernando Money	Democratic nominee for U.S. Senator from Mississippi (Class 1); 1908 (early), 1916	Succeeded by Hubert D. Stephens
Preceded by Hernando Money	U.S. senator (Class 1) from Mississippi; March 4, 1911 – March 3, 1923; Served alongside: LeRoy Percy, James K. Vardaman, Pat Harrison	Succeeded by Hubert D. Stephens
