= 1934 United States Senate election in Mississippi =

1934 Democratic Senate primary election in Mississippi
- September 18, 1934
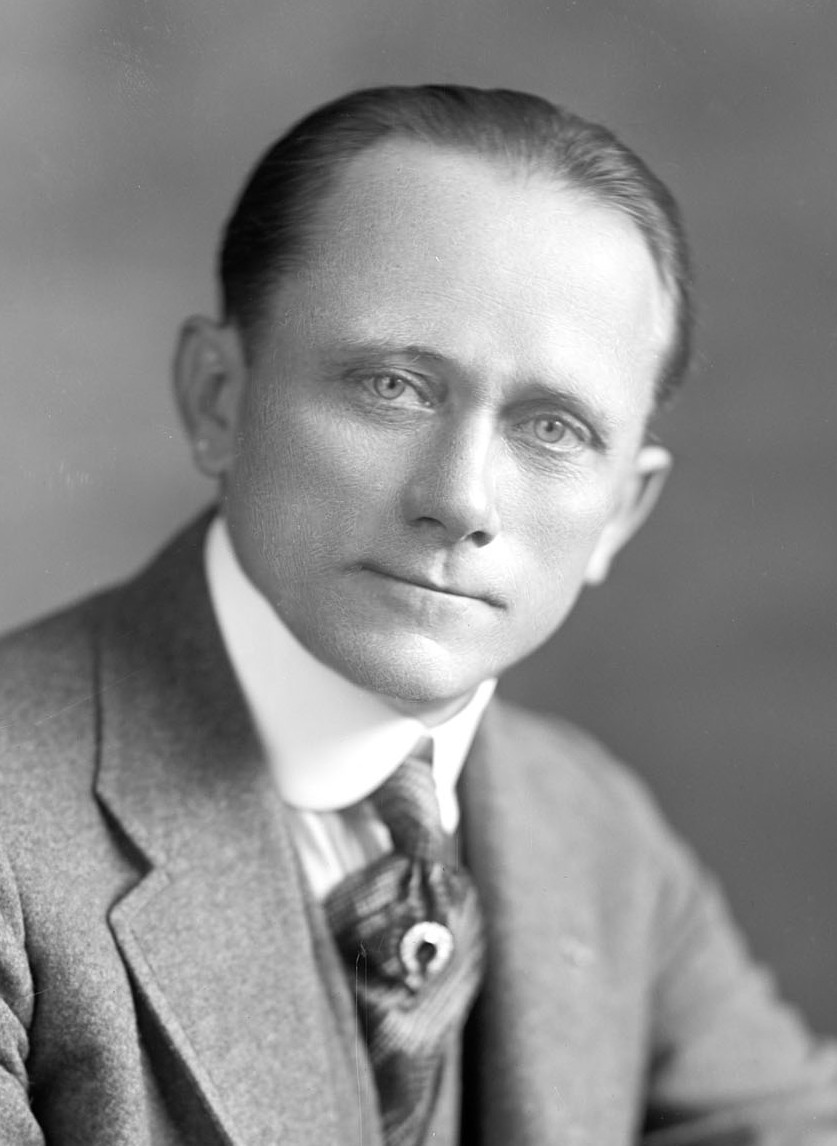

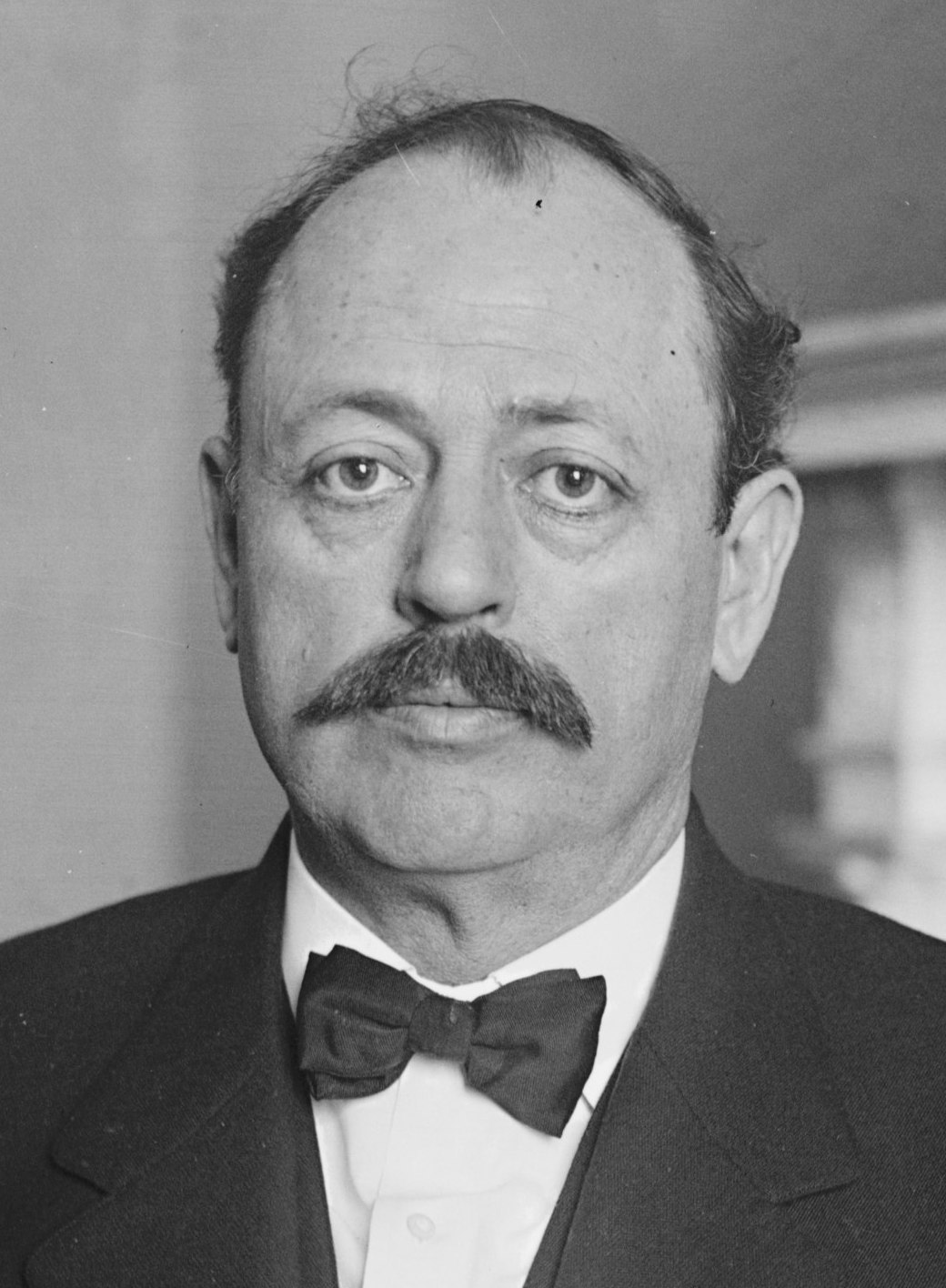
Nominee	Theodore Bilbo	Hubert Stephens
Party	Democratic	Democratic
Popular vote	101,702	94,587
Percentage	51.81%	48.19%
- County results Bilbo: 50–60% 60–70% 70–80% 80–90% Stephens: 50–60% 60–70% 70–80% 80–90%
U.S. senator before election
Hubert Stephens
Democratic
Elected U.S. Senator
Theodore Bilbo
Democratic

The 1934 United States Senate election in Mississippi was held on November 6, 1934. Incumbent Senator Hubert Stephens ran for re-election to a third term, but was defeated by Governor Theodore Bilbo in a close run-off election.

On August 28, Stephens won the Democratic primary over Bilbo and Meridian Congressman Ross Collins in a close three-way race. Since no candidate received a majority of the vote, the election proceeded to a run-off between Stephens and Bilbo. On September 18, Bilbo won the run-off by just 7,115 votes.

Bilbo won the November general election without an opponent.

== Democratic primary ==
=== Candidates ===
- Theodore Bilbo, former Governor of Mississippi
- Ross A. Collins, U.S. Representative from Meridian
- Frank H. Harper, Hattiesburg resident
- Hubert Stephens, incumbent Senator

=== Results ===
1934 United States Senate Democratic primary
Party	Candidate	Votes	%
Democratic	Hubert Stephens (incumbent)	64,035	37.32%
Democratic	Theodore Bilbo	63,752	37.16%
Democratic	Ross A. Collins	42,209	24.60%
Democratic	Frank H. Harper	1,586	0.92%
Total votes		171,582	100.00%

== Primary runoff ==
=== Results ===
1934 United States Senate Democratic runoff
Party	Candidate	Votes	%
Democratic	Theodore Bilbo	101,702	51.81%
Democratic	Hubert Stephens (incumbent)	94,587	48.19%
Total votes		196,289	100.00%

== General election ==
1934 United States Senate election
Party	Candidate	Votes	%	±%
Democratic	Theodore Bilbo	51,609	100.00%	Steady
Total votes		51,609	100.00%	
