= Samuel A. Witherspoon =

American politician (1855–1915)

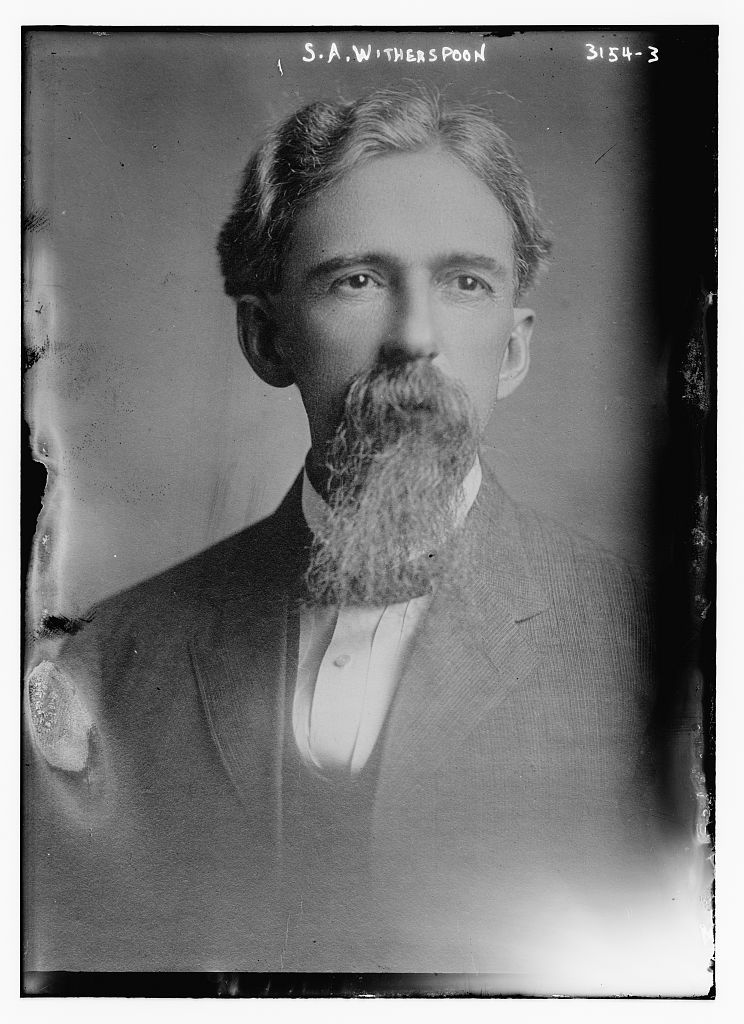
- Witherspoon c. 1913

Member of the U.S. House of Representatives from Mississippi's 5th district
- In office March 4, 1911 – November 24, 1915
- Preceded by: Adam M. Byrd
- Succeeded by: William W. Venable

Personal details
- Born: Samuel Andrew Witherspoon; May 4, 1855 near Columbus, Mississippi, U.S.
- Died: November 24, 1915 (aged 60) Meridian, Mississippi, U.S.
- Resting place: Rose Hill Cemetery
- Party: Democratic
- Education: University of Mississippi
- Profession: Politician, lawyer

Samuel Andrew Witherspoon (May 4, 1855 – November 24, 1915) was a U.S. representative from Mississippi.

== Biography ==
Born near Columbus, Mississippi, Witherspoon attended the public schools. In 1872 he moved with his mother to Oxford, Mississippi. He graduated from the University of Mississippi at Oxford in 1876 with a degree in law. He became a professor at the University of Mississippi from 1876 to 1879. He was admitted to the bar in 1879 and commenced practice in Meridian, Mississippi, the same year.

Witherspoon was elected as a Democrat to the Sixty-second, Sixty-third, and Sixty-fourth Congresses and served from March 4, 1911, until his death in Meridian, Mississippi, November 24, 1915. He was interred in Rose Hill Cemetery.

== See also ==
- List of members of the United States Congress who died in office (1900–1949)

U.S. House of Representatives
Preceded by Adam M. Byrd	Member of the U.S. House of Representatives from Mississippi's 5th congressional district 1911–1915	Succeeded by William W. Venable
