= Mississippi's 8th congressional district =

Former U.S. House district in Mississippi

Coordinates: 32.629923°N 90.339441°W

- Obsolete district
- Created: 1900
- Eliminated: 1930
- Years active: 1903-1933

Mississippi's 8th congressional district existed from 1903 to 1933. It was created after the 1900 census and abolished following the 1930 census.

== Boundaries ==
The 8th congressional district boundaries included all of Hinds, Madison, Rankin, Warren, and Yazoo County. It also included the southern portion of modern Humphreys County (included as part of Yazoo County at that time).

== List of members representing the district ==
Member	Party	Years	Cong ress	Electoral history
District created March 4, 1903
John Sharp Williams (Yazoo City)	Democratic	March 4, 1903– March 3, 1909	58th 59th 60th	Redistricted from the 5th district and re-elected in 1902. Re-elected in 1904. Re-elected in 1906. Retired to run for U.S. senator.
James W. Collier (Vicksburg)	Democratic	March 4, 1909– March 3, 1933	61st 62nd 63rd 64th 65th 66th 67th 68th 69th 70th 71st 72nd	Elected in 1908. Re-elected in 1910. Re-elected in 1912. Re-elected in 1914. Re-elected in 1916. Re-elected in 1918. Re-elected in 1920. Re-elected in 1922. Re-elected in 1924. Re-elected in 1926. Re-elected in 1928. Re-elected in 1930. Retired.
District eliminated March 3, 1933
