= David C. Glenn =

American lawyer, politician (1824–1868)

David Chalmers Glenn (1824 – September 1868) served two terms as Attorney General of Mississippi.

Born in North Carolina, after their father's death, he was sent along with two brothers to live with their uncle James Wilson Chalmers in Holly Springs, Mississippi. He was a Democrat.

He moved to Jackson, Mississippi, established a law pracitce, and married Patience B. Wilkinson of Holly Springs on November 27, 1846. They had two children. He held various public offices and was a states' rights advocate in the Democratic Party.

He was a candidate for state auditor on the John A. Quitman ticket.

Before the Civil War he was living in coastal Mississippi and in private practice. He was a delegate to Mississippi's secession convention in 1861.
