= George C. McKee =

American politician (1837–1890)

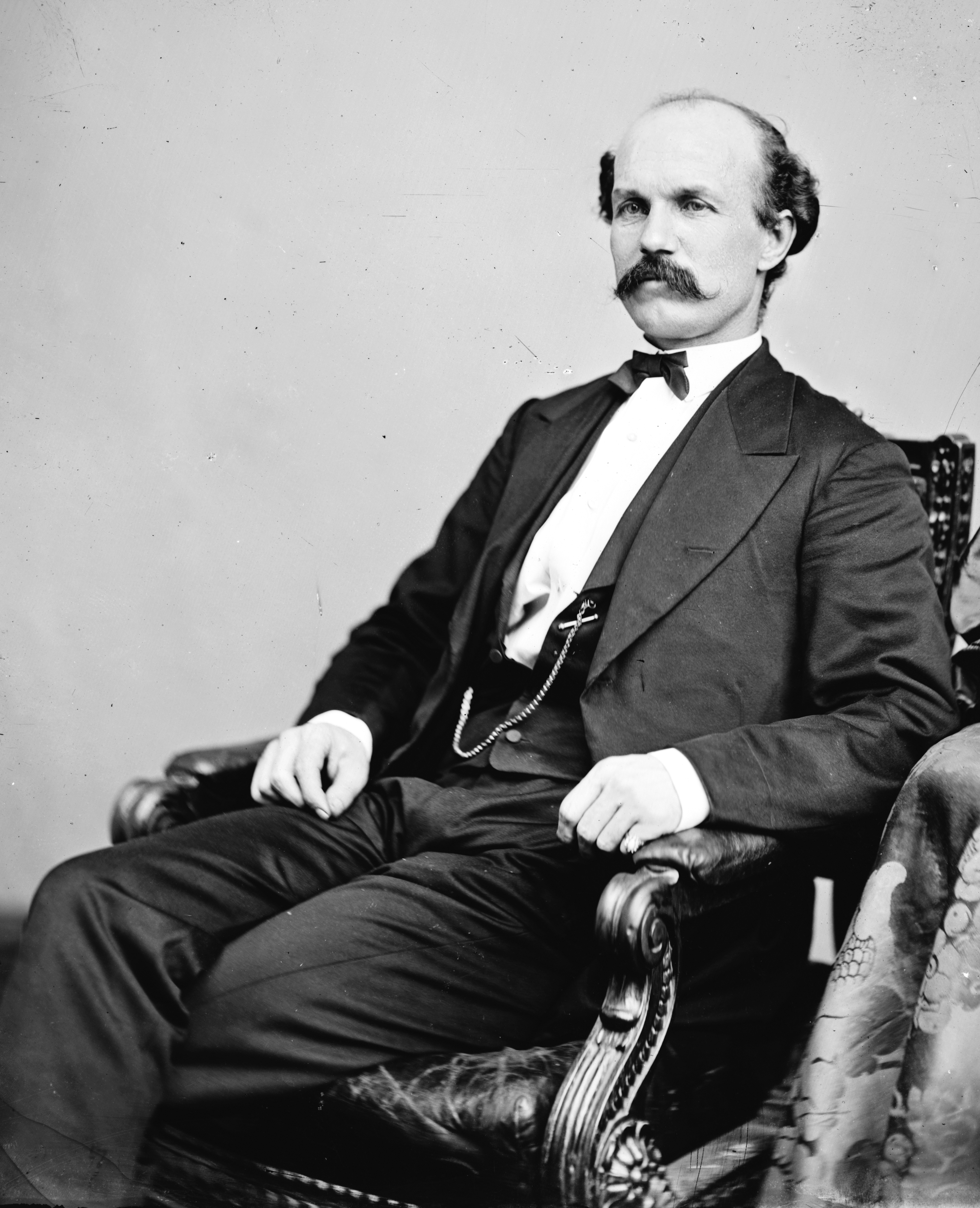

Member of the U.S. House of Representatives from Mississippi
- In office February 23, 1870 – March 3, 1875
- Preceded by: Vacant (4th); Legrand W. Perce (5th)
- Succeeded by: Jason Niles (4th); Charles E. Hooker (5th)
- Constituency: 4th district (1870-73); 5th district (1873-75)

Personal details
- Born: George Colin McKee; October 2, 1837 Joliet, Illinois
- Died: November 17, 1890 (aged 53) Jackson, Mississippi
- Party: Republican
- Education: Knox College; Lombard College

George Colin McKee (October 2, 1837 – November 17, 1890) was a U.S. representative from Mississippi. A lawyer in Illinois, he served with the Union army during the Civil War and afterwards settled in Vicksburg, Mississippi. A Republican, he was active in politics and was a delegate to the 1868 Mississippi Constitutional Convention. He served as a postmaster.

== Early life ==
Born in Joliet, Illinois, Mckee attended Knox College and Lombard College, both in Galesburg, Illinois, where he studied law. He was admitted to the bar in 1858 and commenced practice in Centralia, Illinois.

== Career ==
McKee served as city attorney of Centralia from 1858 to 1861. He served in the Eleventh Regiment, Illinois Volunteer Infantry during the Civil War. After the war, he resumed the practice of law in Vicksburg, Mississippi, and engaged in planting in Hinds County. He was appointed register in bankruptcy in 1867. He served as member of the State constitutional convention in 1868.

Mckee was elected as a Republican to the Fortieth Congress, but his credentials were never presented to the House.

Mckee was elected as a Republican to the Forty-first, Forty-second, and Forty-third Congresses (February 23, 1870 – March 3, 1875).

He served as chairman of the Committee on Territories (Forty-third Congress). After his congressional service, he resumed his law practice. He was appointed postmaster of Jackson, Mississippi, and served from June 28, 1881, to November 12, 1885. He served as receiver of public moneys from 1889 until his death in Jackson, Mississippi, on November 17, 1890. He was interred in Greenwood Cemetery.

U.S. House of Representatives
Preceded by Vacant	Member of the U.S. House of Representatives from Mississippi's 4th congressional district 1870–1873	Succeeded by Jason Niles
Preceded by Legrand W. Perce	Member of the U.S. House of Representatives from Mississippi's 5th congressional district 1873–1875	Succeeded by Charles E. Hooker
