= W. Arthur Winstead =

American politician (1904–1995)

William Arthur Winstead
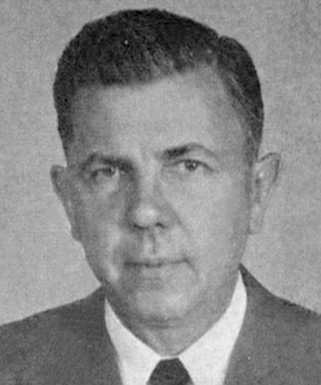

Member of the U.S. House of Representatives from Mississippi
- In office January 3, 1943 – January 3, 1965
- Preceded by: Ross Collins
- Succeeded by: Prentiss Walker
- Constituency: 5th district (1943-1963); 4th district (1963-1965)

Personal details
- Born: January 6, 1904 Philadelphia, Mississippi, USA
- Died: March 14, 1995 (aged 91) Philadelphia, Mississippi
- Resting place: Cedar Lawn Cemetery in Philadelphia, Mississippi
- Party: Democratic
- Education: Clark Memorial College University of Alabama at Tuscaloosa University of Southern Mississippi
- Occupation: Farmer, educator Automobile dealer

William Arthur Winstead (January 6, 1904 – March 14, 1995) was a farmer and politician, elected as U.S. Representative from Mississippi's 5th and 4th congressional districts, serving from 1943 to 1965. He surprisingly lost the 1964 election by a substantial margin, when his Republican opponent, Prentiss Walker, benefited from voters supporting Barry Goldwater in his presidential campaign in the state.

== Early life and education ==
Born near Philadelphia, Mississippi, Winstead attended the public schools, Clarke Memorial College in Newton, Mississippi; and the University of Alabama at Tuscaloosa. He graduated in 1931 from the University of Southern Mississippi, then known as Mississippi Southern College, at Hattiesburg.

Winstead was a farmer. In his first elected office, he became the superintendent of education in his native Neshoba County, serving from 1935 to 1942.

== Political career ==
Winstead was elected as a Democrat to the Seventy-eighth and to the ten succeeding Congresses (January 3, 1943 – January 3, 1965). Like nearly all other Mississippi Democrats, he was an ardent segregationist and signed the Southern Manifesto after the United States Supreme Court ruled in Brown v. Board of Education (1954) that segregated schools were unconstitutional.

Having won the Democratic Party primary in what was essentially a one-party state since the state constitution's effective disfranchisement of blacks in 1890, Winstead was unopposed in his first bid for Congress. With its backing at that time almost entirely African-American, the Republican Party had become comatose after disfranchisement of almost all of its base and most of its membership. Democratic nomination subsequently became tantamount to election, thus, Winstead faced an opponent once during his ten successful campaigns.

However, in 1964, Winstead was defeated by Republican challenger Prentiss Walker by a shocking 11-point margin. Winstead was swept out in large part from the district and state swinging dramatically to support Barry Goldwater's presidential bid. Goldwater carried over half of Mississippi's counties by over 90 percent of the vote.

== Return to private life ==
Winstead resumed agricultural pursuits. He later became an automobile dealer. From 1968 to 1971, he was appointed as the commissioner of the Mississippi Department of Public Welfare under Governor John Bell Williams, one of his former U.S. House colleagues.

Winstead died at the age of ninety-one in Philadelphia, Mississippi. He is interred there at Cedar Lawn Cemetery.

U.S. House of Representatives
Preceded by Ross Collins	Member of the U.S. House of Representatives from Mississippi's 5th congressional district 1943–1963	Succeeded by William M. Colmer
Preceded by John B. Williams	Member of the U.S. House of Representatives from Mississippi's 4th congressional district 1963–1965	Succeeded by Prentiss Walker
