= Joseph H. Beeman =

American politician

Joseph H. Newman

Member of the U.S. House of Representatives from Mississippi's 4th district
- In office March 4, 1891 – March 3, 1893
- Preceded by: Chapman L. Anderson
- Succeeded by: John Sharp Williams

Member of the Mississippi House of Representatives from the Scott County district
- In office January 1884 – March 4, 1891

Personal details
- Born: Joseph Henry Beeman; November 17, 1833 Gatesville, North Carolina, US
- Died: July 31, 1909 (aged 75) Lena, Mississippi, US
- Resting place: Beeman Cemetery, Lena, Mississippi
- Party: Democratic

Military service
- Allegiance: Confederate States of America
- Branch/service: Confederate States Army
- Rank: Lieutenant
- Battles/wars: American Civil War

Joseph Henry Beeman (November 17, 1833 – July 31, 1909) was an American educator and slave owner and officer in the Confederate States Army during the Civil War. He later served a term as a U.S. representative from Mississippi from 1891 to 1893.

== Biography ==
Born near Gatesville, North Carolina, Beeman moved with his parents to Morgan County, Alabama, in 1847 and to Mississippi in 1849. He received an academic education, teaching for several years. Beeman then engaged in mercantile pursuits.

=== Civil War ===
He served as a lieutenant in the Confederate States Army during the Civil War.

=== Early political career ===
He represented Scott County in the Mississippi House of Representatives for 4 two-year terms, serving from 1884 to 1891. Beeman connected with the Farmers' Alliance and served as chairman of its executive committee. He served as delegate to several State conventions.

=== Congress ===
Beeman was elected as a Democrat to the Fifty-second Congress (March 4, 1891 – March 3, 1893). He was not a candidate for reelection in 1892.

=== Later career and death ===
Beeman engaged in agricultural pursuits until his death near Lena, Mississippi on July 31, 1909. He was interred in Beeman Cemetery, Lena, Mississippi.

== Bibliography ==
- United States Congress. "Joseph H. Beeman (id: B000309)". Biographical Directory of the United States Congress.
- Beeman, Joseph Henry Dictionary of North Carolina Biography.

U.S. House of Representatives
| Preceded by Chapman L. Anderson | Member of the U.S. House of Representatives from Mississippi's 4th congressional district 1891–1893 | Succeeded by John S. Williams |
