= Ross A. Collins =

American politician (1880–1968)

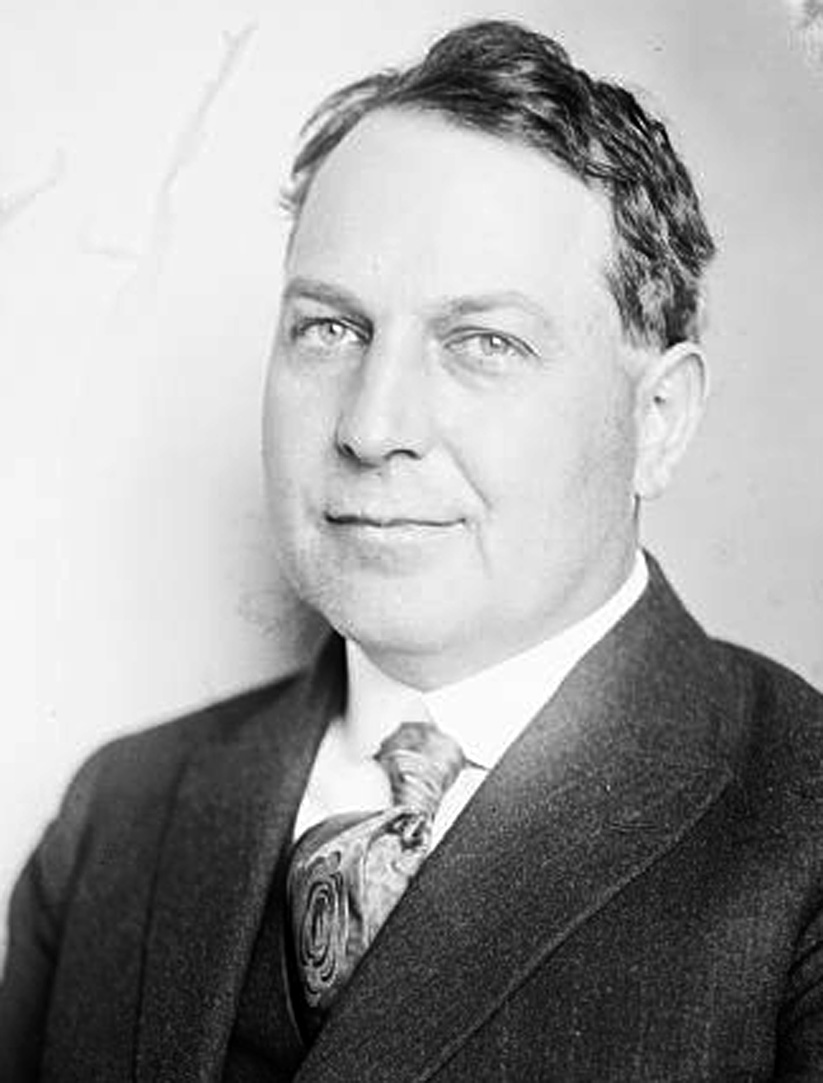

Member of the U.S. House of Representatives from Mississippi's 5th district
- In office March 4, 1921 – January 3, 1935
- Preceded by: William W. Venable
- Succeeded by: Aubert C. Dunn
- In office January 3, 1937 – January 3, 1943
- Preceded by: Aubert C. Dunn
- Succeeded by: W. Arthur Winstead

Attorney General of Mississippi
- In office 1912–1920
- Governor: Earl L. Brewer; Theodore G. Bilbo
- Preceded by: Shepherd Spencer Hudson
- Succeeded by: Frank Roberson

Personal details
- Born: Ross Alexander Collins; April 25, 1880 Collinsville, Mississippi, U.S.
- Died: July 14, 1968 (aged 88) Meridian, Mississippi, U.S.
- Resting place: Magnolia Cemetery
- Party: Democratic
- Education: University of Kentucky; University of Mississippi

Ross Alexander Collins (April 25, 1880 – July 14, 1968) was a U.S. representative from Mississippi.

Born in Collinsville, Mississippi, Collins attended the public schools of Meridian, Mississippi, and Mississippi Agricultural and Mechanical College. He graduated from the University of Kentucky at Lexington in 1900 and from the law department of the University of Mississippi at Oxford in 1901. He was admitted to the bar in 1901 and commenced practice in Meridian, Mississippi. He served as Mississippi Attorney General from 1912 to 1920. He was an unsuccessful candidate for Governor of Mississippi in 1919.

Collins was elected as a Democrat to the Sixty-seventh and to the six succeeding Congresses (March 4, 1921 – January 3, 1935). In 1929, Collins successfully proposed the Library of Congress's $1.5 million purchase of Otto Vollbehr's collection of incunabula, including one of four remaining perfect vellum copies of the Gutenberg Bible. He was not a candidate for renomination in 1934, but was an unsuccessful candidate for the Democratic nomination for United States Senator.

He was awarded American Library Association Honorary Membership in 1938.

Collins was elected to the Seventy-fifth, Seventy-sixth, and Seventy-seventh Congresses (January 3, 1937 – January 3, 1943).

In the late 1930s he was the chairman of the House Subcommittee on District Appropriations; during his time in office, he cut spending on local DC funds for welfare and education stating that "my constituents wouldn't stand for spending money on niggers".

He was an unsuccessful candidate for election to the United States Senate in 1941. He was not a candidate for renomination in 1942, but was an unsuccessful candidate for the Democratic nomination for United States Senator. He resumed the practice of law. He died in Meridian, Mississippi, July 14, 1968. He was interred in Magnolia Cemetery.

Legal offices
Preceded by Shepherd S. Hudson	Attorney General of Mississippi; 1912–1920	Succeeded by Frank Roberson
U.S. House of Representatives
Preceded by William W. Venable	Member of the U.S. House of Representatives from Mississippi's 5th congressional district 1921–1935	Succeeded by Aubert C. Dunn
Preceded by Aubert C. Dunn	Member of the U.S. House of Representatives from Mississippi's 5th congressional district 1937–1943	Succeeded by W. Arthur Winstead
