= Hurricane Isaac (2012) =

Category 1 Atlantic hurricane in 2012

- Isaac close to peak strength and approaching Louisiana on August 28

Meteorological history
- Formed: August 21, 2012
- Extratropical: September 1, 2012
- Dissipated: September 3, 2012

Category 1 hurricane
- 1-minute sustained (SSHWS/NWS)
- Highest winds: 80 mph (130 km/h)
- Lowest pressure: 965 mbar (hPa); 28.50 inHg

Overall effects
- Fatalities: 41
- Damage: $3.84 billion (2012 USD)
- Areas affected: Leeward Islands, Puerto Rico, Venezuela, Hispaniola, Cuba, The Bahamas, Florida, Louisiana, Arkansas, Kentucky, Mississippi, Alabama, Missouri, Illinois, Indiana
- IBTrACS /
- Part of the 2012 Atlantic hurricane season

Hurricane Isaac was a deadly and destructive tropical cyclone that came ashore in the U.S. state of Louisiana during August 2012. The ninth named storm and fourth hurricane of the annual hurricane season, Isaac originated from a tropical wave that moved off the west coast of Africa on August 16. Tracking generally west, a broad area of low pressure developed along the wave axis the next day, and the disturbance developed into a tropical depression early on August 21 while several hundred miles east of the Lesser Antilles. The system intensified into a tropical storm shortly thereafter, but high wind shear initially prevented much change in strength.

Isaac tracked between Guadeloupe and Dominica late on August 22, and then turned towards the west-northwest and entered a region favorable for intensification; it passed over Haiti and Cuba at strong tropical storm strength. A ridge of high pressure to Isaac's north intensified and turned it westward over the Florida Keys by August 26, and Isaac entered the eastern Gulf of Mexico the next day. Gradual intensification occurred, in which the system reached its peak intensity as a Category 1 hurricane, with 1-minute sustained winds of 80 mph (130 km/h), prior to making two landfalls, both at the same intensity, on the coast of Louisiana during the late evening hours of August 28 and early morning hours of August 29, respectively. The system gradually weakened once inland, but still produced a widespread tornado outbreak across the middle of the country before dissipating into an open low early on September 1.

Before it became a hurricane, Isaac produced flooding rain across much of the Lesser and Greater Antilles. Particularly hard hit was the island of Haiti, where 24 people lost their lives. Overflowing rivers led to significant structural damage and many roadways were washed away, preventing aid to the affected area. Gusty winds and rainfall were reported in Cuba, but damage was limited to a few buildings. In Florida, Isaac produced several inches of rain, leading to flooding. Strong winds knocked out power to thousands, and waves along the coast caused minor beach erosion. The most severe effects of the storm, however, occurred in Louisiana after the storm was upgraded to hurricane intensity.

Tropical storm-force sustained winds, with gusts well over hurricane strength, knocked out power to hundreds of thousands, and heavy rain led to flooding. Many dams along the coast were briefly over-topped, though they did not break completely and were later pumped to prevent failure. Gusts near hurricane intensity and heavy rain also led to widespread power outages in the neighboring state of Mississippi, and parts of Alabama recorded nearly 1 ft (300 mm) of rain. As an extratropical cyclone, Isaac produced torrential rains across Arkansas, flooding numerous streets and homes, and damaging many crops across the region. Strong winds felled downed lines and trees. Overall, Isaac caused $3.84 billion (2012 USD) in damage and led to 41 fatalities.

== Meteorological history ==
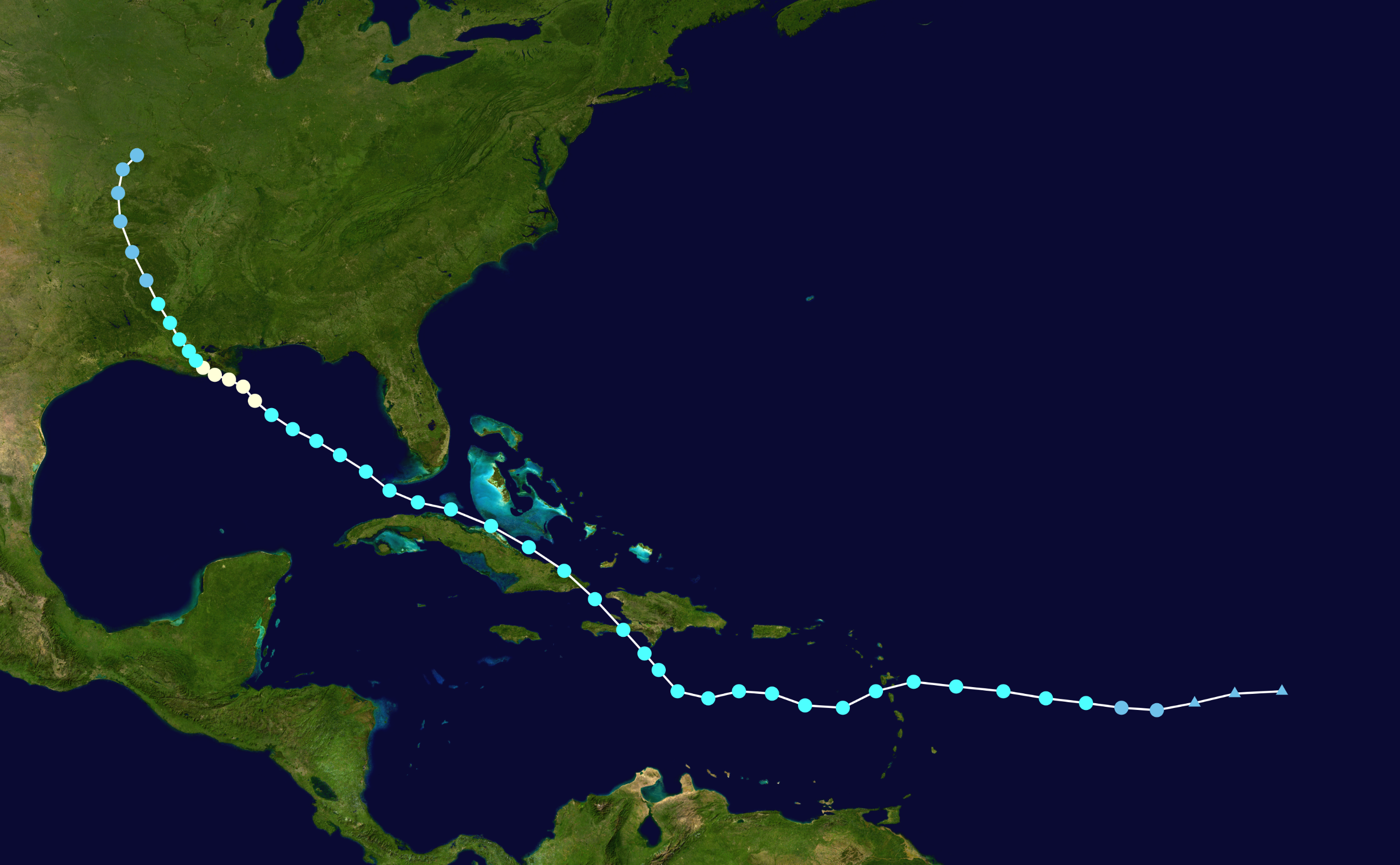
Map plotting the storm's track and intensity, according to the Saffir–Simpson scale Map key Saffir–Simpson scale Tropical depression (≤38 mph, ≤62 km/h) Tropical storm (39–73 mph, 63–118 km/h) Category 1 (74–95 mph, 119–153 km/h) Category 2 (96–110 mph, 154–177 km/h) Category 3 (111–129 mph, 178–208 km/h) Category 4 (130–156 mph, 209–251 km/h) Category 5 (≥157 mph, ≥252 km/h) Unknown Storm type Tropical cyclone Subtropical cyclone Extratropical cyclone, remnant low, tropical disturbance, or monsoon depression

A tropical wave crossed the west coast of Africa between August 15 and August 16. Later that day and early on August 17, the system began developing more convection, while located just west of Sierra Leone. As a result, the National Hurricane Center (NHC) began monitoring the system in the Tropical Weather Outlooks (TWOs). Thereafter, further organization briefly halted, though by early on August 18, associated convection became more concentrated. On the following day, the wave had a "high" probability of undergoing tropical cyclogenesis. Between early on August 19 and early on August 21, minimal structural improvement occurred, despite increases in development probability. By August 21, the system developed enough organization for the NHC to initiate advisories on Tropical Depression Nine; at the time, the depression was about 715 mi (1,151 km) east of the Leeward Islands, moving west to the south of a large ridge. Conditions were generally favorable for further intensification, except for northeasterly wind shear.

Late on August 21, a Hurricane Hunters mission observed flight-level winds of 51 mph (82 km/h), and on this basis the NHC upgraded the depression to Tropical Storm Isaac. Despite its intensification, the storm was disorganized with its center north of the deepest convection. The circulation became elongated early on August 22, and the storm absorbed drier air in its northeast quadrant. Later that day, the low pressure area passed just south of Guadeloupe and into the Caribbean Sea. Dry air continued to hinder convection, although Isaac gradually became better organized. By late on August 24, the Hurricane Hunters observed a well-defined circulation; by that time, however, the strongest convection was moving over Hispaniola. An eye feature developed early on August 25, and Isaac attained winds of 70 mph (110 km/h) before crossing the southwest peninsula of Haiti.

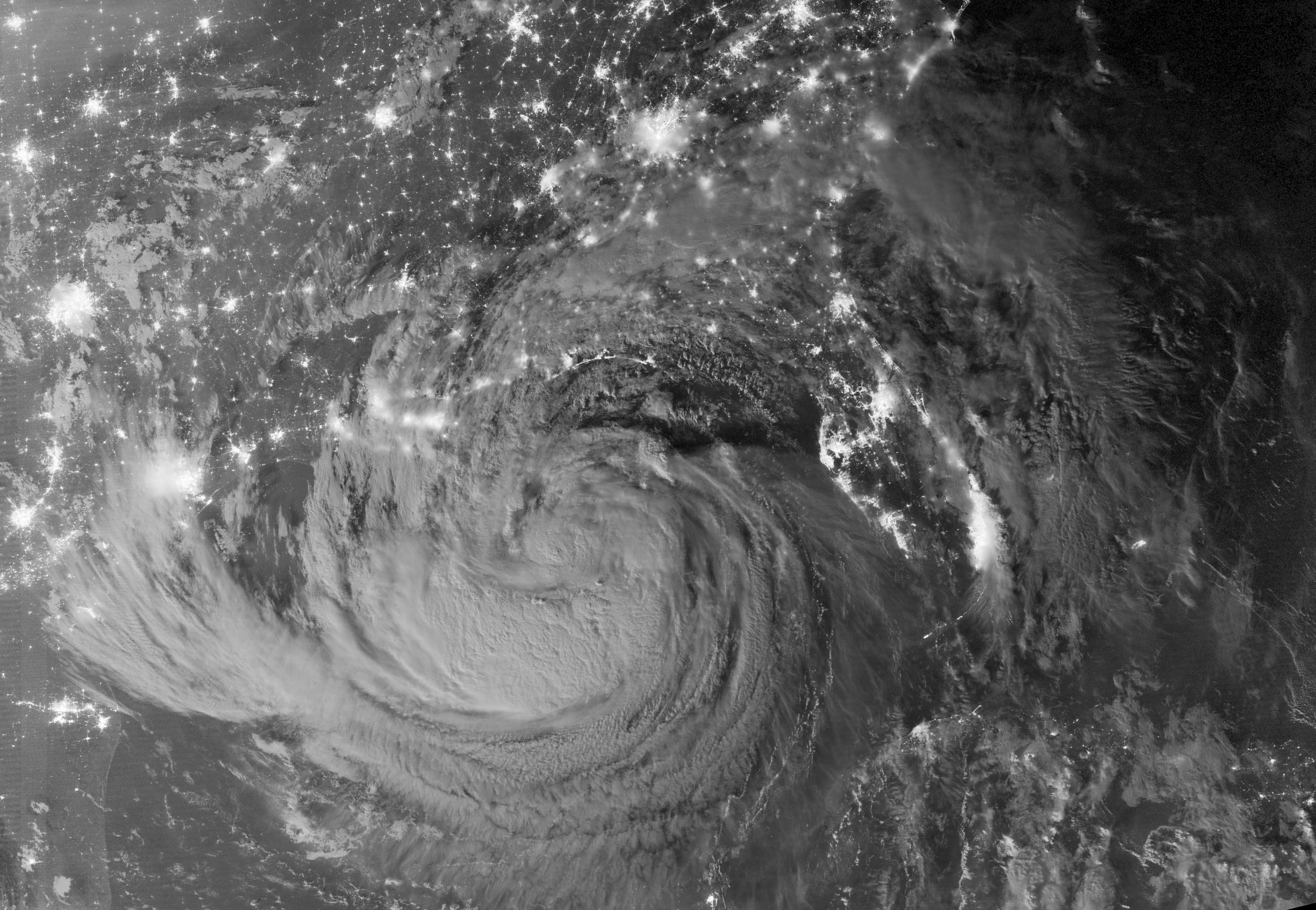
Visible satellite image during early morning August 29 of Isaac as it slowly moves over the northern Gulf of Mexico.

While moving across Haiti, the circulation of Isaac became disrupted while the convection became disorganized. Continuing to the northwest, the storm moved along the north coast of Cuba. Convection increased over the center by early on August 26, and Isaac re-intensified slightly while entering the Straits of Florida. However, continued dry air prevented the inner core of convection from developing. Hurricane Hunters reported that a ragged eye developed multiple times, but the feature did not persist. The storm tracked northwestward across the Gulf of Mexico due to a subtropical ridge to its north. Although the barometric pressure continued to decrease, Isaac remained a large storm, which contributed to the lack of strengthening. At about 1620 UTC (11:20 a.m. CDT) on August 28, Isaac attained Category 1 hurricane status about 75 mi (121 km) south-southeast of the mouth of the Mississippi River, based on data from the Hurricane Hunters.

After further intensification, Isaac made landfall at 2345 UTC (6:45 p.m. CDT) on August 28, just southwest of the mouth of the Mississippi River with winds of 80 mph (130 km/h). The eye moved back over water shortly thereafter, crawling just offshore of southeastern Louisiana (with little change in strength) before Isaac struck Louisiana again just west of Port Fourchon at 0715 UTC (2:15 a.m. CDT) on August 29. Hours after it made landfall, Isaac's eye became less circular and was open on the western side. Around 1900 UTC (2:00 p.m. CDT) on August 29, the hurricane weakened into a tropical storm as it slowly moved through Louisiana. Despite its weakening, Isaac continued to produce strong thunderstorms to the east and southwest of the center. Around 2100 UTC (4:00 p.m. CDT) on August 30, Isaac degenerated into a tropical depression over northern Louisiana. The Hydrometeorological Prediction Center took over the responsibility on issuing advisories from the NHC at 0300 UTC on August 31. The depression continued generally northeastward over Arkansas and Missouri before transitioning into an extratropical cyclone on September 1 as it interacted with an upper-level trough. The remnants of Isaac continued generally eastward over southern Illinois before moving southward over Kentucky. On September 3, the mid-level circulation of the storm split into two parts, with one portion continuing southward into the Gulf of Mexico and the other eastward over Ohio.

== Preparations ==
=== Lesser Antilles ===
Tropical Storm Isaac approaching the eastern Caribbean on August 22

Upon the issuance of the National Hurricane Center's first advisory for Tropical Depression Nine early on August 21, numerous islands across the Lesser Antilles were placed under hurricane watches or tropical storm warnings. By the end of the day, tropical storm warnings were in place for was issued for Anguilla, Antigua, Barbuda, the British Virgin Islands, Culebra, Dominica, Guadeloupe, Desirade, Les Saintes, Marie Galante, Martinique, Montserrat, Nevis, Puerto Rico, Saba, St. Eustatius, St. Maarten, St. Martin, St. Kitts, United States Virgin Islands, and Vieques. Hurricanes watches were also in place for Puerto Rico, Vieques, Culebra, and the United States Virgin Islands. As the storm continued westward towards the region, a hurricane watch was issued for the British Virgin Islands on August 22. Later that day, Isaac entered the eastern Caribbean Sea as a minimal tropical storm rather than a hurricane, resulting in the discontinuation of all previously issued hurricane watches. As the storm gradually moved further westward into the Caribbean, warnings were discontinued for the various islands, with all warnings ceasing by the end of August 23.

=== Greater Antilles and The Bahamas ===
At 0900 UTC on August 22, the government of the Dominican Republic issued a tropical storm watch along the north coast of the Dominican Republic, from the border with Haiti eastward to Saona Island. Simultaneously, a hurricane watch was put into place on the south coast, also extending from the Haitian border to Saona Island. At Guantanamo Bay Naval Base, a trial for five prisoners, who allegedly planned the September 11 attacks, was postponed.

At 1030 UTC on August 24, the government of Jamaica issued a tropical storm watch for the entire island of Jamaica. Early on the following day, the Cayman Islands Meteorological Service designated the Cayman Islands under a tropical storm watch. Several hours later on August 25, the tropical storm watches for both Jamaica and the Cayman Islands were discontinued.

=== Gulf of Mexico ===
Oil production in the Gulf of Mexico was down by 24% percent and gas off by 8%, as several major companies (including BP and Shell) evacuated their installations in the east part of the basin. Overall, at least 39 (7%) of 596 production platforms and eight (11%) of 76 Gulf oil rigs were evacuated in the Gulf on August 26. By the evening of August 27, approximately 78% of the Gulf's crude oil production and 48% of its natural gas production had been closed.

=== United States ===
==== Florida ====
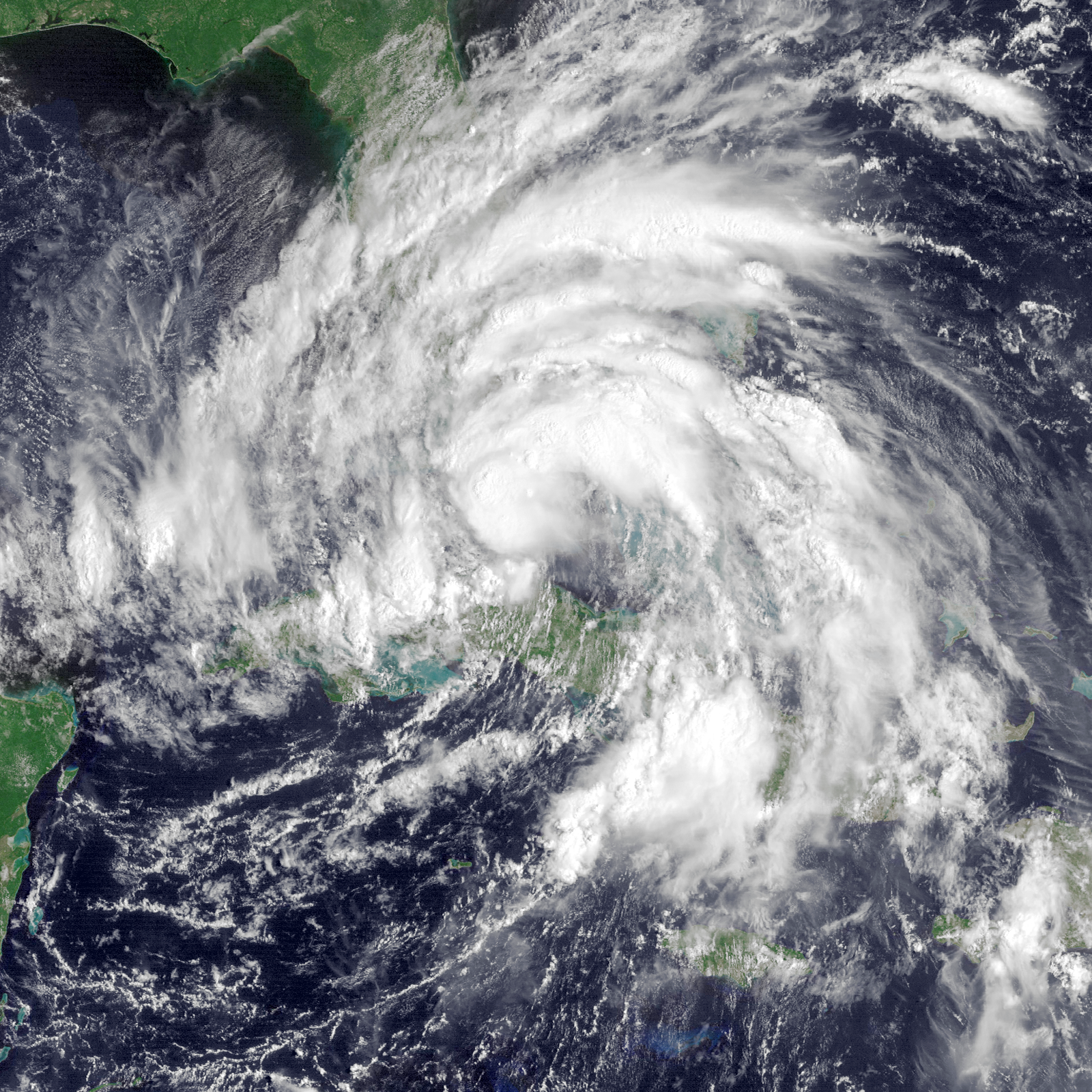
Tropical Storm Isaac approaching the Florida Keys on August 26

At 2100 UTC on August 24, a tropical storm watch was issued for all of Florida south of the Jupiter Inlet on the east coast and south of Bonita Springs; it also included Lake Okeechobee and the Florida Keys. Early on the next day, the tropical storm watch was upgraded to a warning, while the Florida Keys and the mainland from Ocean Reef to Bonita Springs were now under a hurricane watch. Further north, a tropical storm watch was issued from the Jupiter Inlet to the Sebastian Inlet. Later on August 25, the hurricane watch was switched to a warning, while a separate hurricane watch was issued from Golden Beach southward.

During the week of August 27, the 2012 Republican National Convention was held in Tampa, Florida. Isaac threatened to force the cancellation or postponement of the convention; there was also potential to move the event's location. According to the Republican National Convention spokesman James Davis, officials had been coordinating with the United States Secret Service, should the 50,000 politicians, delegates, and reporters require evacuation. The Republican National Convention was pushed to August 28, with the storms threatening the coast of Tampa. Chairman of the Republican National Convention Reince Priebus announced on August 25 that the convention would only convene for a short amount of time on August 27 and "immediately recess until Tuesday afternoon, August 28". At the same time, Governor of Florida Rick Scott announced he would not be attending the convention, together with Governor of Alabama Robert J. Bentley. On August 25, Governor Scott declared a state of emergency for the state of Florida ahead of Tropical Storm Isaac. Amtrak suspended the Silver Meteor and Silver Star train service from Orlando to Miami on Sunday, August 26. In Miami-Dade County, evacuations were ordered for residents living in mobile homes. Additionally, the bridges across the Port of Miami were closed during the height of Isaac. Orange juice prices increased due to the threat of the storm in Florida, which produces more than 75 percent of orange crops in the United States.

The Florida Division of Emergency Management was put into partial activation, and Florida Power & Light brought in at least 4,300 workers to help with expected power outages. Key West International Airport suspended all flights in preparation of Isaac, while all cruises and many theme parks were delayed. The United States Coast Guard activated hurricane condition "whiskey", restricting the transportation of watercraft until the storm passed. In South Florida, specifically in Monroe County, many schools were used as shelters. In Miami-Dade County, all public schools and universities – including Florida International University and the University of Miami – cancelled classes. While the airport in the county remained open, it cancelled hundreds of flights and delayed many others. As the storm passed, regular services became available once again. Across the remainder of the state, especially in coastal counties, most schools and government buildings were closed. In Escambia County, a mandatory evacuation was ordered for zones A, B, and C. Many shelters were opened for those who had nowhere to go, and all county schools were shut down. At Naval Air Station Pensacola, many planes were either evacuated from the base or placed into secure hangars. Farther east in Santa Rosa County, a mandatory evacuation was also ordered for zones A, B, and C, including all mobile home parks, campgrounds, low-lying areas, and RV parks. In Walton County, special needs and general shelters were opened to the public, and all schools and government offices were to be shut down throughout the duration of the storm. The Clyde B. Wells Bridge was also shut down in anticipation of tropical storm-force winds.

==== Louisiana ====
NASA's TRMM Satellite Sees Hurricane Isaac Drench Louisiana (3D View)

Upon the issuing of hurricane watches warnings, Louisiana Governor Bobby Jindal declared a state of emergency for the entirety Louisiana, recommending evacuation of areas unprotected by levees or areas south of the Intracoastal Waterway. Mayor of New Orleans Mitch Landrieu took the same course of action for his city. However, he stated that the Louis Armstrong New Orleans International Airport, convention center, and Mercedes-Benz Superdome would not be emergency shelters. Residents of Plaquemines Parish's eastern bank were ordered a mandatory evacuation on August 26, while a voluntary evacuation was ordered for southern areas of the parish from Ironton to Venice. In other regions of the parish, levees were lined with visqueen to protect exposed dirt, with sandbags being added to levees in other locations including Pointe à la Hache. Evacuation orders were also placed for visitors and tourists in Grand Isle on the same day, with residents ordered to evacuate on August 27. In St. Charles Parish and Terrebonne Parish, 73,000 residents were ordered to evacuate. FEMA began to deliver meals and tarpaulins to the state on August 28. 4,000 National Guard troops were activated in the state. The closure of all schools and Universities in South East Louisiana, including Louisiana State University followed Gov. Jindal's State of Emergency declaration.

Governor Jindal announced that he would not attend the 2012 Republican National Convention and would remain in his state to take care of storm-related problems. On August 27, President Obama ordered federal aid to Louisiana to supplement state and local response efforts due to the emergency conditions resulting from Tropical Storm Isaac beginning on August 26, 2012. Governor Jindal on August 27 sent a letter to the Obama administration that the declaration fell short of the help he was requesting. Gov. Jindal had temporarily suspended Louisiana's licensing requirements for emergency medical technicians, to let medical assistance officials from other states help Louisiana respond to Hurricane Isaac. Louisiana Commissioner of Administration Paul Rainwater announced that all state government offices would be closed August 29. The US Army Corps of Engineers closed the Seabrook Floodgate and the IHNC Lake Borgne Surge Barrier to protect the New Orleans area from a storm surge.

==== Mississippi ====
Mississippi Governor Phil Bryant declared a state of emergency the evening of August 26, 2012 The governor ordered mandatory evacuations to begin at 8 a.m. CT (9 a.m. ET) on August 27 for residents along the coast and in some low-lying areas inland. On August 27, the Jackson County Board of Supervisors ordered a mandatory evacuation of all areas south of U.S. Route 90. It included all areas south of US 90 in Ocean Springs, Mississippi, Gautier, Mississippi and Pascagoula, Mississippi. The evacuation was in effect as of 4pm CT. Officials dispatched 1,500 National Guard troops to the state's three southern counties, as well as 45 state troopers to ease traffic flow. On August 28, the president signed an emergency declaration for the state of Mississippi.

==== Alabama ====
Alabama Governor Robert J. Bentley declared a state of emergency ahead of Isaac. Mandatory evacuations for Baldwin and Mobile counties beginning at 8:00 a.m. on August 27 for zones one and two. Governor Bentley soon announced that he would not be attending the 2012 Republican National Convention, and will remain in his state to take care of storm-related problems. On August 28, Governor Bentley lifted the mandatory evacuation orders covering southern Baldwin and Mobile counties and issued voluntary orders for areas vulnerable to Isaac's expected impact.

== Impact and aftermath ==
Deaths and damage by country
Country	State/ Territory	Total deaths	Damage (USD)	Source
Cuba		0	$30 million	
Dominican Republic		5	>$30 million	
Haiti		24	$250 million	
United States
United States	Alabama	0	$9.4 million	
United States	Florida	0 (2)	$83.2 million	
United States	Louisiana	3 (2)	>$612 million	
United States	Mississippi	2	$24.3 million	
United States	Puerto Rico	0 (1)	$3,000	
United States	U.S. total:	5 (5)	>$2.8 billion	
Venezuela		0 (2)	Unknown	
Totals:		34 (7)	~$3.84 billion	
Because of differing sources, totals may not match.

=== Lesser Antilles ===
In Martinique, a meteorologist reported at least 3 inches (76 mm) of rain.

=== Venezuela ===
Isaac did not directly impact Venezuela, but the storm's outer bands produced heavy rains over part of the country. In the state of Sucre, the Manzanares River overflowed its banks in the town of Cumanacoa, flooding approximately 1,200 homes, many of which were damaged and a few destroyed. Some residents had to be airlifted to safety. Similar flooding occurred elsewhere in the country, such as in Caracas where 40 families had to be evacuated. Across Caracas, transportation was significantly disrupted as the local Metro suspended service and debris blocked local roads. The most significant flooding in the city occurred in western areas where hundreds of families had to be evacuated. In the state of Monagas, heavy rains and high winds damaged a total of 47 homes. Several roads were blocked by downed trees and flooding, temporarily isolating a few cities. Across the states of Anzoátegui, Monagas, and Sucre, 3,200 families were affected by the floods and 600 homes were damaged or destroyed. In the state of Yaracuy, flooding destroyed 10 homes and affected 70 others. At least two people were killed and two others were listed as missing in various events related to the storm.

=== Greater Antilles ===
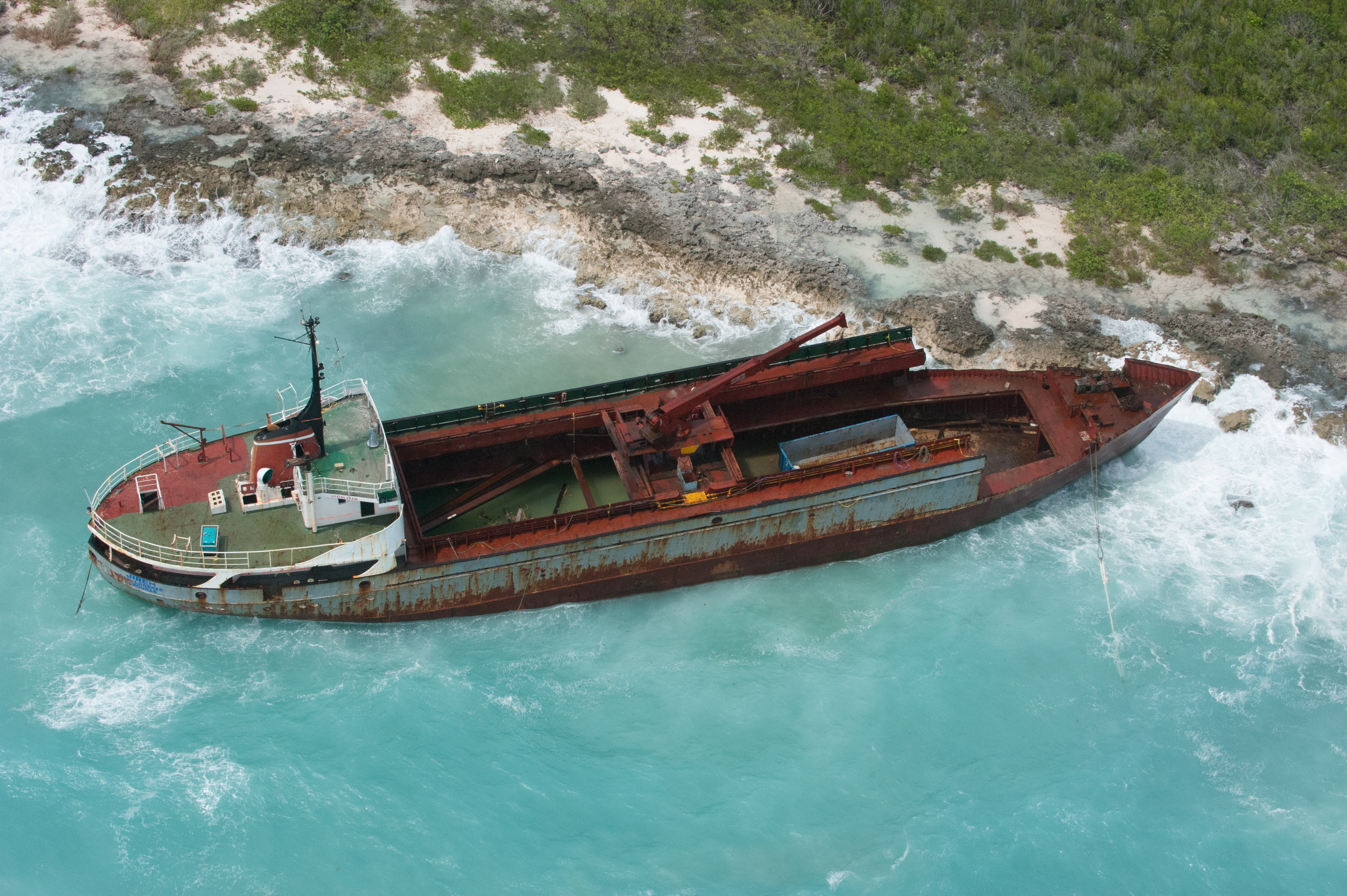
Three years later, the MV Jireh remained grounded on a beach of Mona Island, Puerto Rico as a result of Tropical Storm Isaac (2012)

Authorities estimated at least 30,000 residents were evacuated across the island of Hispaniola.

==== Haiti ====
Isaac swept across Haiti's southern peninsula, bringing flooding and storms in areas affected by the January 2010 earthquake. A woman and a child died in the town of Souvenance, and a 10-year-old girl died in Thomazeau when a wall fell on her. A seven-year-old boy was electrocuted in the city of Gonaives. As many as 5,000 people were evacuated because of flooding, as scores of tents in quake settlement camps collapsed and at least 300 houses were flooded in the Port-au-Prince shantytown of Cité Soleil. Doctors Without Borders announced it anticipated a spike in cholera cases due to flooding and it was preparing to receive more patients. President Michel Martelly canceled his trip to Japan to coordinate emergency response efforts and visit residents with Prime Minister Laurent Lamothe. On August 26, 2012, the Haitian government announced that at least 14,000 people had left their homes, while another 13,500 were living in emergency shelters. According to official figures, at least a dozen houses were destroyed and 269 damaged during the storm. On August 28, the death toll in Haiti was revised up to at least 24, with three others missing. News reports in the area stated up to 29 deaths, however.

Agricultural losses across the country amounted to $242 million. Damage to the nation's electrical infrastructure reached 336 million gourdes (US$7.9 million).

==== Dominican Republic ====
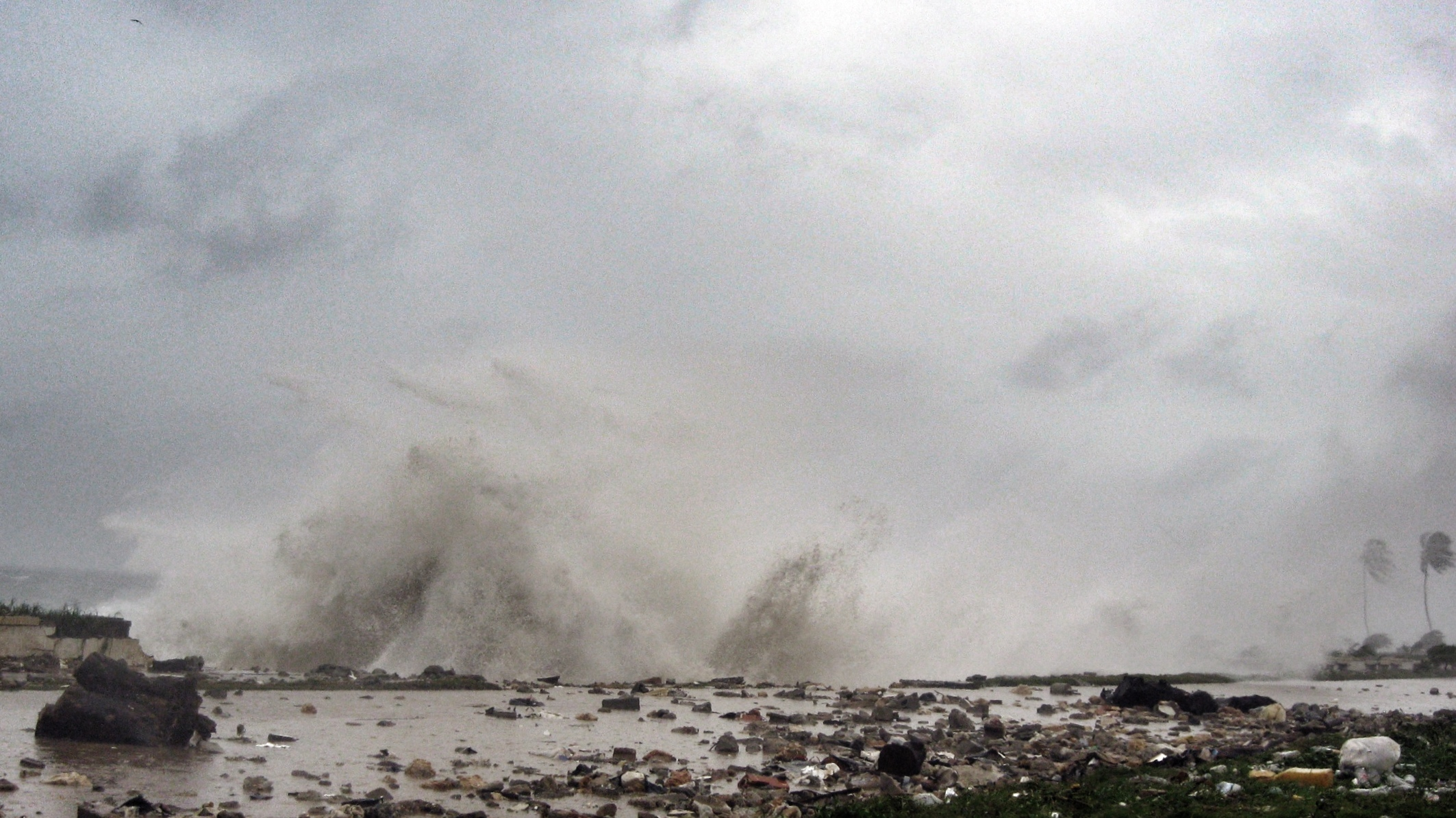
Waves from Tropical Storm Isaac battering the coast of the Dominican Republic.

Authorities in the Dominican Republic evacuated nearly 7,800 people from low-lying areas, and at least 10 rural settlements were cut off by flooding. Parts of Santo Domingo lost electricity during the height of the storm. At least five fatalities were reported, including three men who drowned in flooded rivers, and 49 homes were destroyed throughout the country. Agricultural losses across the country were estimated to be at least $30 million.

==== Cuba ====
The center of the storm crossed Cuba 28 miles (45 km) west of Maisí, the extreme eastern tip of Cuba, according to state television. In Baracoa, the electricity was cut off as a preventive measure, and at least two houses were destroyed by flooding. Authorities announced 230 people were in emergency shelters. Intermittent rains and gusty winds were present even in Havana, almost 560 miles (900 km) away.

==== Puerto Rico ====
One indirect fatality occurred in Puerto Rico after a 75-year-old woman fell from a second-floor balcony in Bayamón while preparing for the storm. In Naguabo, minor coastal flooding had resulted in at least one road closure. Scattered to widespread power outages were also confirmed throughout Puerto Rico. Damage across Puerto Rico amounted to $3,000.

=== United States ===
Hurricane Isaac was one of the largest-diameter US Gulf Coast hurricanes. Though large size does not imply strength—which is based on sustained wind measurements—it can mean that more people are exposed to its hazards.

As of 12 P.M. (CDT) Thursday, August 30, power companies said more than 900,000 customers were without power in Louisiana, Mississippi, Alabama, Florida, Texas and Arkansas. 34 tornadoes touched down across the Southeast from August 27 to September 4 and Isaac (and later its remnants) moved across that part of the country.

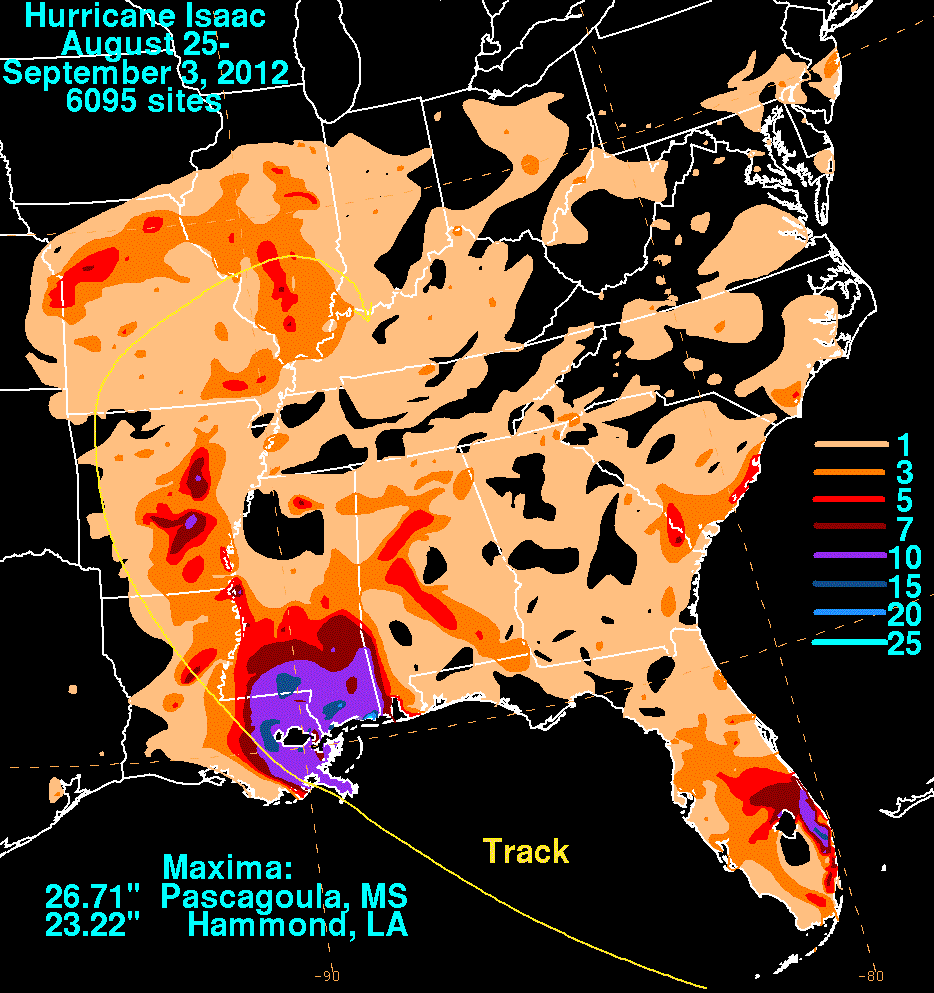
Storm total rainfall from Isaac, August 25 – September 3, 2012

==== Florida ====
The storm impacted nearly all of Florida, despite not making landfall in the state. Due to the weak intensity and path offshore, damage was caused primarily by flooding, rather than winds. Persistent rainbands brought heavy precipitation to much of east-central and southeast Florida. In central Palm Beach County, the highest observed total precipitation was 15.86 inches (403 mm), though radars estimated that as much as 18 to 20 inches (460 to 510 mm) fell in some areas. The resultant flooding left entire neighborhoods isolated and caused damage to homes, businesses, and roads in Palm Beach County. Other areas, such as Broward, Indian River, Martin, Miami-Dade, and St. Lucie counties, were also impacted by flooding, albeit less severely. Two people in Palm Beach County due to traffic accidents during the storm.

Despite the Florida Keys being the closest to the path of the storm, effects there were minimal. In Molasses Reef, sustained winds reached 44 mph (71 km/h), while winds peaked at 41 mph (66 km/h) in Sombrero Key. Rainfall in the Florida Keys was light, peaking at 1.61 inches (41 mm) at the National Weather Service Office in Key West. Winds were stronger in Miami-Dade County, reaching 60 mph (97 km/h) at the Atlantic Oceanographic and Meteorological Laboratory (AOML) headquarters in Virginia Key. Many trees and power lines were downed throughout the county, with an estimated 33,000 residences experiencing power outages. Tides reaching up to 6 feet (1.8 m) caused major beach erosion and minor coastal flooding in Naples. Between Everglades City and Chokoloskee, up to 3 feet (0.91 m) of tidal inundation occurred, leaving roads flooded, stranding some people. In Goodland, water entered a few homes but was mainly confined to streets, yards, and marinas. Less than 2,000 people were left without electricity in Collier County. Damage within that county was estimated to have reached $6 million. Throughout southeastern Florida, 113,000 people were left without electricity. Heavy rainfall fell in portions of Broward County, peaking at 11.21 inches (285 mm) at the intersection of State Road 997 and Interstate 75 near Weston. Other significant precipitation totals include 10.86 inches (276 mm) in Miramar, and 10.41 in (264 mm) in Coral Springs, with 7 to 10 in (180 to 250 mm) reported at numerous other locations in the county. Moderate to severe flooding occurred over parts of northern Broward County. In Lauderhill, canals overflowed their banks and streets were flooded for a few days. Additionally, a few homes sustained minor water damage. Water also entered a few homes and businesses in Tamarac. Standing water also forced the closure of a few on-ramps to the Sawgrass Expressway. Losses in Broward County reached $1 million.

The outer bands produced relatively strong winds in Palm Beach County. Wind gusts were estimated to have reached 60 mph (97 km/h) in Tequesta, where the shutters were ripped from a life guard stand and also moved the structure about 3 feet (0.91 m) from its original location. Additionally, winds in the area blew significant amounts of sand away, exposing rocks and creating 8–10-foot (2.4–3.0 m) drops. Slightly further south, waves of 8–10 feet (2.4–3.0 m) pounded the beaches of Jupiter, though only minimal beach erosion was reported. Nonetheless, hundreds of sea turtle nests were swept away, though 100 hatchlings were brought to the Loggerhead Marinelife Center in Juno Beach. In Palm Beach County, the outer bands dropped significant amounts of rainfall, with radar estimates as high as 20 inches (510 mm) in some areas. The highest observed precipitation total, measured in that vicinity, was 15.86 inches (403 mm) at Lion Country Safari in Loxahatchee, while 13.754 inches (349.4 mm) fell in Boynton Beach, 13.1 inches (330 mm) fell in Greenacres and 12.55 inches (319 mm) fell in Wellington. Nearly all of the eastern half of Palm Beach County experienced at least 10 inches (250 mm) of precipitation. The rains stranded several neighborhoods for several days. In some areas, flooding was considered the worst since Hurricane Irene in 1999. At the post office in Loxahatchee, the parking lot was flooded, forcing the building to close for several days. A major washout was reported in West Palm Beach at the intersection of State Roads 80 and 882. Also in West Palm Beach, a road collapsed and fire rescue crews quickly closed the road. On State Road 704, a portion of it became inaccessible to low-clearance vehicles. Several major and minor roads were also inundated by water in Wellington. Additionally, there was flooding at the intersections of Meadow Avenue and Greenview Shores Boulevard, and Indian Mound Road and South Shore Boulevard. Heavy rainfall left several leaking roofs at an apartment complex in Pahokee. In the southern portion of Palm Beach County, flooding and wind damage was also reported. Residents reported an unconfirmed tornado in Lake Worth. It knocked over some trees and damage a shed and some roofs, as well as cause a few power outages. The entrance to the gated community of Lawrence Grove in Boynton Beach was flooded by about 1 foot (300 mm) of water and passable only by large pickup trucks. In Delray Beach, lightning struck a tree, causing part of it to fall through an awning, break a window, and slice into a house. Streets were littered with small branches and palm fronds in Boca Raton, while low-lying roads and swales were flooded with several inches of water. One small tree was uprooted across the street from City Hall. Initially, schools throughout the county were to remain open. However, in response to flooding, all Palm Beach County schools were closed on August 27 and August 28. Thereafter, all but eight county public schools – located in Loxahatchee and The Acreage – were opened. Damage estimates for Palm Beach County reached $71.59 million, $40 million of which was incurred to the Indian Trail Improvement District.

Precipitation amounts ranging from 4 to 8 inches (100 to 200 mm) were common throughout Okeechobee County. The most significant impacts occurred in the city of Okeechobee and adjacent areas, such as Taylor Creek. Overflowing creeks and canals caused major flood damage to 14 homes, while another 146 had minor water intrusion. Several roads were temporarily closed due to standing water. Winds were relatively light, with gusts between 30 and 40 mph (48 and 64 km/h) along the northern shores of Lake Okeechobee. In nearby Martin County, rainfall averaged between 5 and 10 inches (130 and 250 mm). As a result, several roads in the county were temporarily impassable, while water entered one business complex in Palm City. Further north in St. Lucie County, rainfall amounts were similar. Standing water was reported on roads in Fort Pierce, Lakewood Park, Port St. Lucie, and White City.

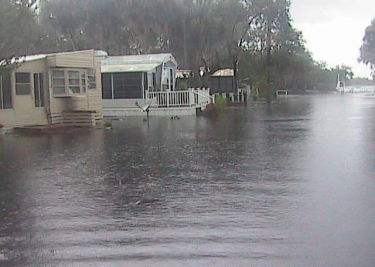
Flooding at Ramblers Mobile Home Park in Sarasota County

The storm also produced heavy rainfall in Indian River County, with 16.5 in (420 mm) reported in Vero Beach. This was the highest observed precipitation total in the state of Florida during Isaac. Elsewhere in Indian River County, rainfall amounts were generally between 7 and 10 inches (180 and 250 mm). Throughout Indian River County, 27 homes and 2 single–family homes were flooded, while 20 roads were temporarily closed due to standing water. An EF0 tornado touched down in Vero Beach for about two minutes, damaging 118 mobile homes and 15 single family houses. The tornado caused $850,000 in losses. At the Vero Beach Municipal Airport, sustained winds reached 43 mph (69 km/h). In Highlands County, up to 6 inches (150 mm) of rain forced the closure of a small portion of U.S. Route 98 between Cowhouse Road and County Road 621 in Lorida. The inundation was caused by Arbuckle Creek overflowing and washing a few inches of water on the road. A damage survey conducted by the National Weather Service indicates that a tornado was spawned near St. Cloud in Osceola County. It destroyed an abandoned mobile home, leaving only a floor attachment to the frame. The tornado moved across a citrus grove, causing damage to trees and shrubs. Thereafter, it removed shingles and broke a window at one residence, while some fences nearby were toppled. Additionally, rainfall amounts ranging from 3 to 6 inches (76 to 152 mm) left several roads impassable. The Myakka River overflowed in Sarasota County, flooding the Ramblers Mobile Home Park. Water rose up to the doorsteps of several units, while parking lots and grassy areas were inundated by water. Due to its weaker and further westward track than initially anticipated, impact in Hillsborough County and the city of Tampa was minimal during the Republican National Convention. On the first day of the convention, August 27, Isaac dropped 2.03 inches (52 mm) of precipitation and brought sustained winds of 21 mph (34 km/h) to Tampa International Airport, with gusts up to 50 mph (80 km/h). A waterspout moved onshore near Tampa, damaging 6 houses in addition to the fences and trees on those properties.

The outer bands and fringe of the storm produced light rainfall and two tornadoes in the Florida Panhandle. The first tornado in the region was spawned near Greenwood in Jackson County, but caused no damage. The other tornado touched down near Graceville in Holmes County and ripped off the front porch of a mobile home and downed numerous trees. Rainfall was reported for a 3-day period in Flagler County from August 26 to August 28. In Palm Coast, communities measured between 2 and 3.5 inches (51 and 89 mm) of precipitation. Some minor flooding occurred in parking lots. Gusty winds of 40 to 50 mph (64 to 80 km/h) felled isolated trees in the western part of the county. A few trees were also blown down in Alachua County, one of which fell onto Main Street in Gainesville. Losses in Escambia and Santa Rosa Counties amounted to $10.4 million and $1.2 million respectively. Some coastal flooding occurred across portions of Bay, Franklin, Gulf, and Wakulla counties due to storm surge. Erosion was most significant in Franklin County, where storm surge was measured at 3.45 feet (1.05 m) in Apalachicola, while tides were 6 to 8 feet (1.8 to 2.4 m) above normal. Water Street in Apalachicola was inundated with over 1 foot (0.30 m) of water in some places. At St. George Island State Park, waves pushed pass the dune line and flooded parking areas. Losses were estimated at $500,000. In Bay County, storm surge reached 2.5 feet (0.76 m) at Panama City, while tides were 8 to 10 feet (2.4 to 3.0 m) above normal. The depth of inundation along 7th Avenue in Panama City ranged from a few inches to about one foot, while other roads in Lynn Haven and West Bay were also flooded. Tides along the coast of Gulf County flooded a road in Indian Pass and the access road to St. Joseph Peninsula State Park, causing closure of the park. In Wakulla County, minor coastal flooding was reported around St. Marks, with 2 to 4 inches (51 to 102 mm) of water in a few businesses. The area experienced tidal flooding only about two months earlier during Tropical Storm Debby. One vacant home experienced minor water intrusion around the time of highest tide in Shell Point.

==== Louisiana ====
Hurricane Isaac approaching the coast of Louisiana from dawn to dusk on August 28, 2012. The movement of clouds at different altitudes creates a textured appearance while thunderstorms near the storm's core bubble up as dusk approaches.

While Isaac was moving ashore Louisiana, it produced a high storm surge that reached 11.0 ft (3.4 m) in Shell Beach. At the coast, the system's large size generated a strong storm surge that caused extensive damage to low-lying areas of the state. A National Ocean Service (NOS) tide gauge located on the southern end of Lake Borgne near Shell Beach registered a storm surge height of 11.03 ft (3.36 m), the highest in association with the storm. The strong storm surge inundated areas of lower Louisiana. Areas of Plaquemines Parish were estimated to have been submerged under as much as 17 ft (5.2 m) of water, based on pressure sensors from the United States Geological Survey. In eastern areas of the parish, water had accumulated from Breton Sound against a levee. The rising water levels later overtopped the levee height, causing it to overflow and inundate primarily uninhabited areas between Braithwaite and Belair. The strong storm surge, in combination with strong winds forced the Mississippi River to flow upstream for nearly a day, rising as much as 10 ft (3.0 m) in Belle Chasse and 8 ft (2.4 m) in New Orleans. In nearby LaPlace, 5,000 homes were flooded by the surge. In contrast to the river's average flow rate downstream of 125,000 ft^{3} (3,500 m^{3}) per second, during the hurricane the river flowed upstream at a rate of 182,000 ft^{3} (5,200 m^{3}) per second. Isaac's storm surged flowed upstream along the Mississippi River as far north as Red River Landing, located 300 mi (480 km) from the river's mouth. In Louisiana, storm surge and storm tide-related impacts caused $493.5 million in damages and three deaths.

Hurricane Isaac dropped heavy rainfall across the state, particularly in eastern areas of Louisiana, which caused flash flooding and river flooding. Rainfall peaked at 23.22 in (590 mm) in Hammond. The city of New Orleans recorded 20.08 inches (510 mm) of rainfall itself. Near Caesar, the East Hobolochitto Creek rose to a record crest 6.5 ft (2.0 m) above its flood stage due to the heavy rain. Runoff caused by heavy rainfall at the Tangipahoa River caused it to rise 9 ft (2.7 m) above its flood stage. In La Salle Parish, the heavy rains forced several road closures. Street flooding also occurred in New Orleans. A strong rainband remained stationary over Rapides Parish, flooding several structures and causing $10,000 in damages.

The large storm brought high winds across the state, with sustained winds of 67 mph (108 km/h) and gusts to 85 mph (137 km/h) on Grand Isle. As of Wednesday afternoon (Aug. 29), over 600,000 customers were reported without power in Louisiana, mainly in Metropolitan New Orleans. Flooding was reported in Slidell, Louisiana, as pumping stations were unable to keep up with rainfall rates. On the morning of August 30, Tangipahoa Parish officials issued a mandatory evacuation for those living on or near the Tangipahoa River from Kentwood to Robert after Lake Tangipahoa Dam at Percy Quin State Park near McComb, Mississippi sustained heavy damage. At the time, McComb Mayor Whitney Rodgers said there was a 50% chance the dam would fail. The dam held, and after the storm water was pumped over the dam to lower the lake levels and begin repairs. St. John the Baptist Parish was one of the hardest hit areas. A lack of a hurricane levee system and 8–10 ft storm surge caused massive flooding of hundreds of homes.

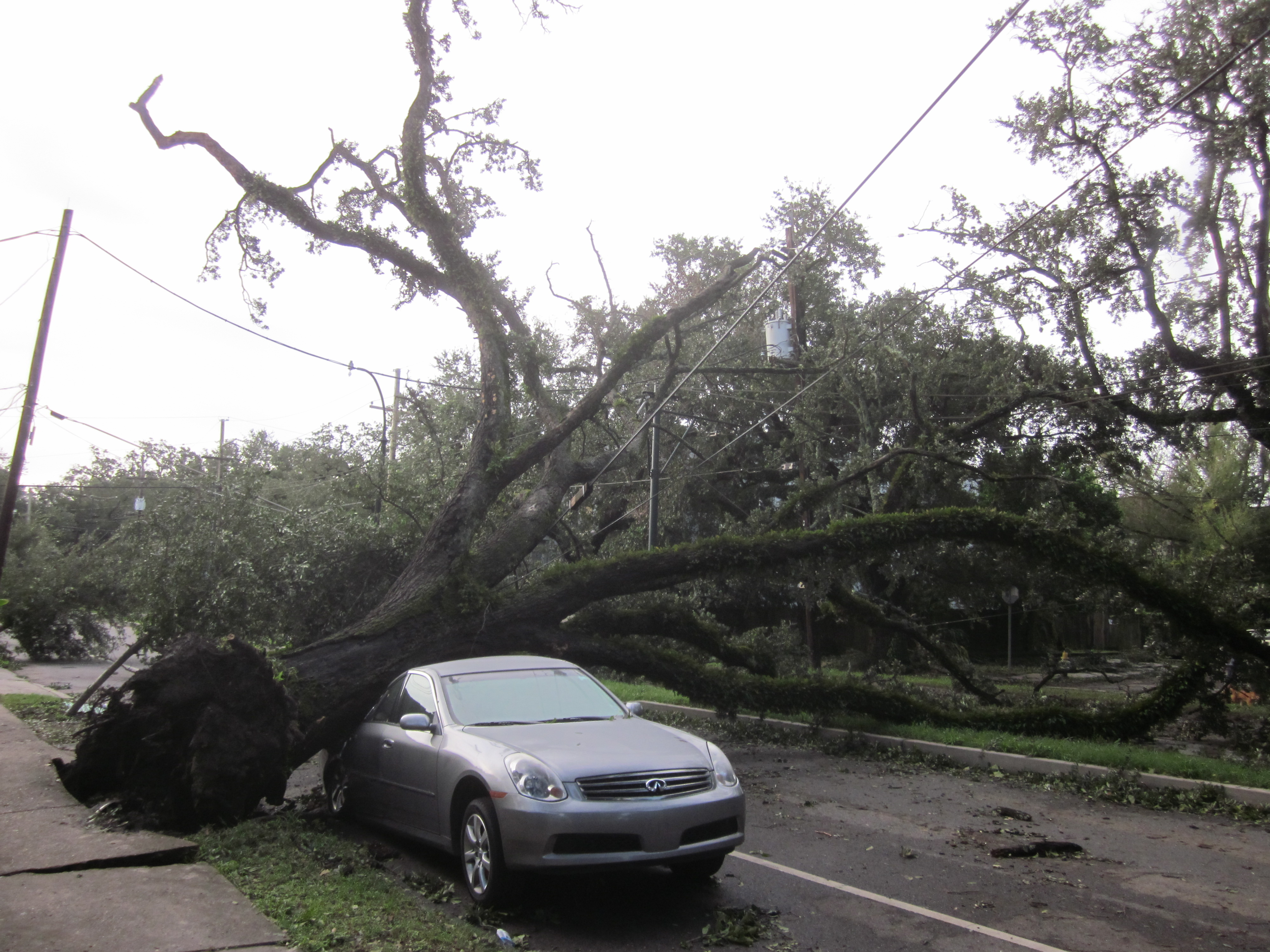
New Orleans experienced hurricane-force winds, but escaped the major flooding suffered by some other parts of southeast Louisiana.

A 36-year-old man was killed in Vermilion Parish when he fell 18 feet from a tree while helping friends move a vehicle before the storm. After an initial rescue of 115 survivors from flooded homes in Braithwaite on the east bank of Plaquemines Parish on August 29, 2 bodies were discovered the next day floating in the kitchen of a flooded home, after a rescued evacuee in a shelter informed authorities of additional missing people. Authorities announced at least two others died in the state due to the storm, including a 75-year-old man who drowned after his car drove off a flooded highway near Slidell, and another man who died in a restaurant fire. Altogether, at least 901,000 homes lost electricity during the passage of Isaac in Louisiana, which accounts for 47% of the state's energy users. By August 31 these were down to less than 600,000 as emergency crews began operations across the region, although authorities warned it would be "days" until power was restored to everyone. By September 1, more than 400,000 customers in the state remained without power. Hurricane Isaac damaged nearly 59,000 homes across southeast Louisiana, which is four times more than previously estimated.

==== Mississippi ====
A 8.3-foot (2.5 m) storm surge was reported in Hancock County on August 28. Wind gusts reached 70 mph (110 km/h) in Gulfport. Three adults and one infant in Mississippi were rescued overnight from a houseboat. There are about 2,132 evacuees housed in 31 shelters across the state and about 4,000 homes were without power as of 5:30 a.m. CT. A man was crushed in the cab of his tow truck in Picayune, Mississippi after a tree fell on it, while he was on a call to assist a stranded motorist. A 62-year-old woman died in similar circumstances on August 30. The National Weather Service reported that 17.04 inches (43.3 cm) of rain had fallen at Kiln, Mississippi through 7:00 PM CDT on August 30; 10.85 inches (27.6 cm) was recorded at Gulfport. The excessive rain from Isaac also eroded the Lake Tangipahoa Dam at Percy Quin State Park, causing it to nearly break and flood the already-high Tangipahoa River.

==== Alabama ====
11.68 inches (29.7 cm) of rain was recorded at Mobile Regional Airport through Wednesday, Aug. 29. Coastal flooding was reported in several towns in Mobile and Baldwin Counties including Bayou la Batre, Gulf Shores and Orange Beach. Hurricane Isaac uncovered the shipwreck of The Rachael—an early 20th-century vessel that ran aground in Gulf Shores, Alabama. According to the Alabama Historical Commission, the ship is believed to have run into rough waters while carrying timber in 1930.

==== Arkansas ====
In Arkansas, damages from the remnants of Hurricane Isaac totaled to at least $30.504 million statewide. Although no deaths were reported, three people were injured in Arkansas. Heavy rainfall from the storm complex caused flooding throughout the state. In Pine Bluff, Arkansas, numerous streets and homes were flooded, along with other structures. In addition, schools in the region, most notably the University of Arkansas at Pine Bluff, were forced to closed early due to the storm. Schools in other areas of Arkansas were also forced to close early. Other areas of the state encountered flash flooding after slow-moving rainbands dropped heavy rains in localized areas. Rainfall peaked at 11.29 in (28.7 cm) in White Hall, Arkansas. While the rainfalls benefited hay crops and pastures, rice crops were heavily damaged, and cotton, corn, and soybean crops suffered relatively minor damage. As a result of the rainfall, several rivers in the state experienced flooding. The worst river flooding impacts were felt in Brooklyn, Arkansas, where the nearby Black Creek caused damage to 15 homes near its banks after overflowing. Despite the rainfall, Isaac's remnants did not lessen the ongoing drought conditions in Arkansas.

Strong winds from Isaac's remnants blew down power poles in Arkansas County, amounting to $4,000 in damages. Strong winds also felled numerous trees. Fallen tree branches were also responsible for taking down power lines. Downed power lines and other electrical issues caused by Isaac resulted in a power outage for more than 20,000 electricity customers in Arkansas.

=== Aftermath ===
Costliest Non-retired Hurricanes
Rank	Cyclone	Season	Damage
1	Sally	2020	$7.3 billion
2	Isaias	2020	$5.02 billion
3	Imelda	2019	$5.0 billion
4	Debby	2024	$4.5 billion
5	Zeta	2020	$4.4 billion
6	Karl	2010	$3.9 billion
7	Idalia	2023	$3.6 billion
8	Isaac	2012	$3.11 billion
9	Delta	2020	$3.09 billion
10	Lee	2011	$2.8 billion

Following the storm, Governor of Florida Rick Scott attended a briefing at the South Florida Water Management District before boarding a helicopter to tour flooded areas of Palm Beach County. Scott said, "We've got to take care of everybody's needs but we've got to get our state back to work," and also encouraged tourists to return to the state, especially in Key West, where hotel owners were considering cancelling reservations for Labor Day. A Florida state fund known as Neighbors to the Rescue – with the purpose of distributing money to help recovery efforts for victims of Isaac – was activated by the governor. The area already qualified for small business loans due to a state of emergency and after the Federal Emergency Management Agency (FEMA) reviewed damage assessments, President of the United States Barack Obama considered a disaster declaration. Initially, FEMA denied a disaster declaration. In response, Governor Scott mailed a letter of appeal to FEMA Administrator Craig Fugate. The appeal was accepted, and on October 18, 2012, President Obama issued a disaster declaration for Bay, Collier, Escambia, Franklin, Gulf, Martin, Monroe, Okaloosa, Palm Beach, St. Lucie, and Santa Rosa counties.

Besides for effects on populated areas, Isaac also had a dramatic effect on the wetlands and barrier islands of southern Louisiana which provide large amounts of biodiversity and offer numerous advantages to humans. The United States Geological Survey conducted multiple aerial surveys of landmasses specifically vulnerable to hurricanes. These surveys were done before and after Hurricane Isaac in order to provide a comparison. Photos of the Chandeleur Islands, a series of barrier islands off of the eastern coast of southern Louisiana, show significant erosion caused by wind and storm surge. Additionally, almost all of the pre-storm vegetation was lost.

== See also ==
- Tropical cyclones in 2012
- Other storms of the same name
- List of Category 1 Atlantic hurricanes
- Hurricane Katrina (2005)- Took similar to Isaac as a Category 1, and made landfall 7 years earlier, then caused catastrophic impacts in Louisiana as a Category 3.
- Hurricane Ike (2008) – A deadly Category 4 hurricane that caused widespread destruction across the Caribbean
- Tropical Storm Lee (2011) – A storm that impacted similar areas
- Tropical Storm Cindy (2017) – A storm that impacted similar areas
- Hurricane Barry (2019) – A minimal hurricane that caused widespread flooding across Louisiana and Arkansas
- Hurricane Laura (2020) – A Category 4 hurricane that took a similar path through the Caribbean into Louisiana, causing widespread damage and dozens of fatalities
