= Goodbee, Louisiana =

Goodbee
- Unincorporated community
- Hamlet of Goodbee
- Location of Goodbee in Louisiana
- Coordinates: 30°29′45″N 90°11′51″W
- Country: United States
- States: Louisiana
- Parish: St. Tammany
- Time zone: UTC-6 (CST)
  - Summer (DST): UTC-5 (CDT)
- Area code: 985

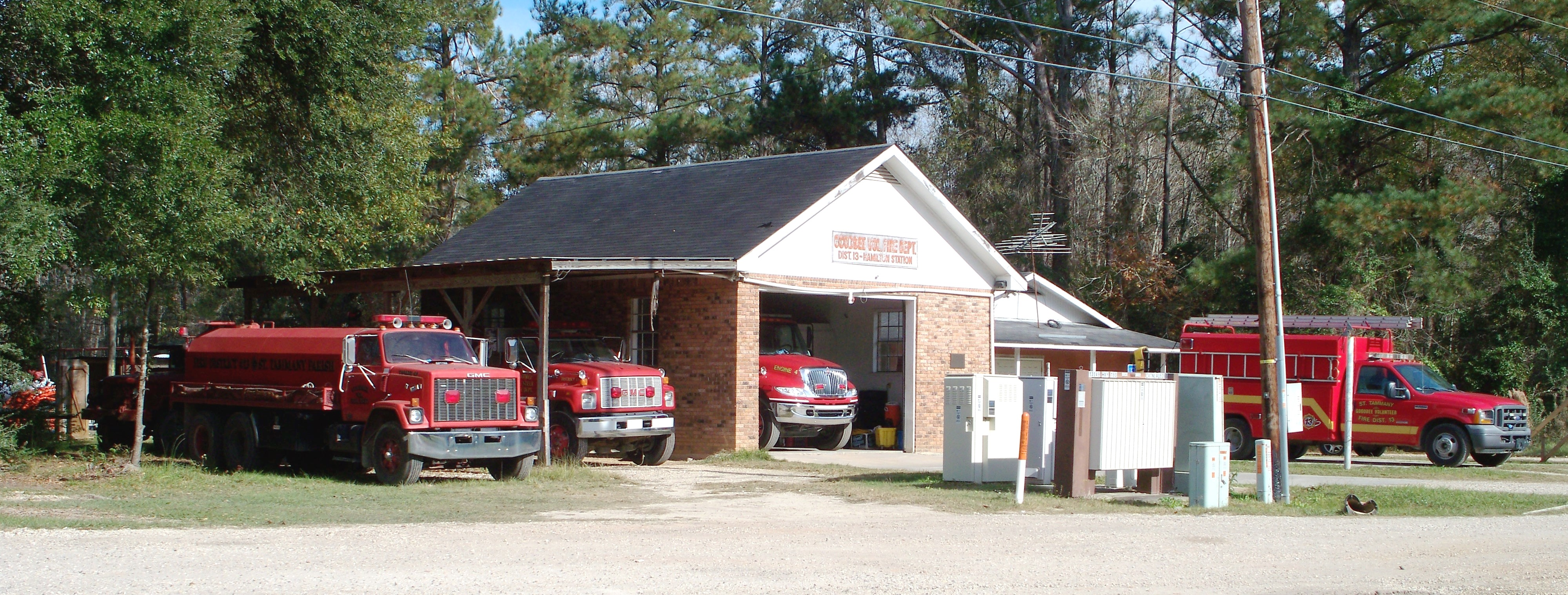
The Goodbee Volunteer Fire Department Hamilton Station offers firefighting services to a rural area of west Saint Tammany Parish, Louisiana. Shown is the original fire house, which was replaced by a larger facility in 2011.

Goodbee is an unincorporated community in Saint Tammany Parish, Louisiana, United States, at the intersection of U.S. Route 190 and Louisiana Highway 1077, west of Covington. Goodbee has a signed exit on Interstate 12 to its south, at its interchange with LA 1077.

Northwest of Goodbee is the start of P-Kaw-Shun Creek, the major contributory to Sims Creek. The stream flows in a generally southwestward direction to join the Tangipahoa River south of Robert in Tangipahoa Parish.

Seven miles west of Goodbee, near Robert, is a major distribution center for Walmart Stores.

Closer to Goodbee, at the boundary between Saint Tammany and Tangipahoa Parishes, is the Florida Parishes Juvenile Detention Center, a correctional institution for youths.
