= Mae Louise Miller =

Former peon held in modern-day slavery

- Miller at a speaking event
- Born: Mae Louise Wall; August 24, 1943; Gillsburg, Mississippi, US
- Died: 2014 (aged 70–71)
- Spouse: Wallace Miller
- Children: 4 (adopted)
- Parent(s): Cain Walls, Sr. Lela Mae Holden Walls

Mae Louise Wall Miller (born Mae Louise Wall; August 24, 1943 – 2014) was an American woman who had been kept in slavery near Gillsburg, Mississippi, and Kentwood, Louisiana, until her family achieved freedom in early 1963.

Mae's story was unearthed when she spoke to historian Antoinette Harrell, who highlighted it in the short documentary The Untold Story: Slavery in the 20th Century (2009). The story inspired the 2022 film Alice.

In 2003, Mae and all six of her siblings joined a federal class action lawsuit seeking reparations to descendants of enslaved people from several private companies with lawyer Deadria Farmer-Paellmann. Mae stated to NPR that "maybe I wasn't free, but maybe it can free somebody else. There's a lot of people out there that's really enslaved and don't know how to get out." In 2004, U.S. District Judge Charles Ronald Norgle Sr. dismissed the lawsuit.

== Childhood in Slavery ==
Historian Antoinette Harrell states that Miller's father Cain Wall lost his own promised farmland after he signed a contract that he could not read which indebted him to a local plantation owner. The Wall family was forced to do fieldwork and housework for several white families attending the same church on the Louisiana-Mississippi border: the Gordon family, the McDaniel family, and the Wall family, the latter of whom may have been related as descendants of the Walls' likely owner, Drury William Wall Jr., who owned 10 slaves in St. Helena, Louisiana, in 1860. Peon owners used the violent coercion akin to that of slavery to force Black people to work off imagined debts with unpaid labor. Peons could not leave their owner's land without permission, which made it impossible for them to pay their debt.

Like most peons, the Wall family was not permitted to leave the land, was illiterate, and was under the impression that "all Black people were being treated like that". They were repeatedly beaten by plantation owners, often including whips or chains. Mae's sister Annie Wall recounted that "the whip would wrap around your body and knock you down". The Wall family was not paid in money or in kind with food: "They beat us. They didn't feed us. We had to go drink water out of the creek." The Wall family ate wild animals and leftovers that were "raked all up in a dishpan" "like slop". "They treated the dogs a whole lot better than they treated us." Mae recounted harvesting cotton, corn, peas, butter beans, string beans and potatoes. "Whatever it was, that's what you did for no money at all".

Mae reported that, starting at 5 years old, she was repeatedly raped along with her mother by the white men of the Gordon family. Miller would get sent to the landowner's house and "raped by whatever men were present". Mae recounted that she was threatened with violence to keep this abuse secret from her father.

Mae said she didn't run for a long time because, "What could you run to? We thought everybody was in the same predicament." Mae recounted first running away at 9 years old, but she was returned to the farm by her brothers, where her father told her that if she ran away, they would be killed. The Wall family obtained their freedom in 1961, which is sometimes inaccurately given as 1962 or 1963. Then 18, Mae refused to do housework for another family in Kentwood, Louisiana, and ran away after the owner threatened to kill her. "I remember thinking they're just going to have to kill me today, because I'm not doing this anymore." In early 1961, an aunt of Mae's from northern Alabama "sneaked us away" on a "horse and wagon" and helped them to relocate.

There was no legal documentation corroborating the atrocities that Mae described. Miller’s situation was hardly unique: White landowners used threats of violence worked with law enforcement to keep people in peonage. Smithsonian Institution historian Pete Daniel noted that "white people had the power to hold Blacks down, and they weren't afraid to use it -- and they were brutal". Mae said that the Wall family's world was "confined from one [plantation] to the other. They trade you off, they come back and get you, from one day to the next." Annie Wall recounted that the plantation owners said "you better not tell because we'll kill 'em, kill all of you." Mae recalled that the plantation owners "have the capability of killing you" and that "we had been beat so much and had been threatened so many times you really didn't know who to tell." The family suffered PTSD from their experiences, along with other serious harms to their directly affected and kin.

When contacted in 2007, a Gordon family member denied Miller's claims. Durwood Gordon, who was younger than 12 when the Wall family worked on the Gordon farm, claimed that the family worked for his uncle Willie Gordon (d. 1950s) and cousin William Gordon (d. 1991). "I just remember [Cain Sr.] was a jolly type, smiling every time I saw him." Durwood also denied Miller's claims of rape: "No way, knowing my uncle the way I do. I knew him to be good people, good folks, Christian."

== Life after freedom ==
In 1963, Mae married Wallace Miller and sought to start a family. A doctor told Mae that she was infertile, possibly from being raped. Instead, Mae adopted four children. In her 30s, Mae returned to school and learned to read and write. In the 1970s, she became a glass-cutter. In 2001, Mae attended a slavery reparations campaign meeting that she had thought was a lecture on Black history. Only then did the Wall family learn that their peonage status had been illegal.

Annie Wall suggested that shame prevented former peons from coming forward: "Why would you want to tell anybody that you was raped over and all that kind of mess?" Mae suggested that they don't want to relive their experiences, and "they don't wanna carry they minds back there." For Mae, telling her story brought relief: "It might bring some shame to the family, but it's not a big dark secret anymore." Harrell noted that "people are afraid to share their stories" because "many of the same white families who owned these plantations are still running local government and big businesses". Harrell argued that "it just isn't worth the risk" to most former peons, so "most situations of this sort go unreported".

== Early census records ==
The Wall family first appears in the 1870 U.S. Census for St. Helena Parish, where Martin Walls (born c. 1815 in Mississippi) is listed as a farm laborer residing with his household. His son, Samuel Walls (born c. 1841), is recorded separately that year as a farmer living alone in the same parish. Samuel later married Diana (born c. 1852), and the couple had seven children, among them a son named John.

In December 1897, John Walls (born December 1878) married Melissa (born March 1881). The newlyweds relocated briefly to New Orleans, where John worked as a day laborer, before returning to St. Helena Parish. There, John and Melissa raised a large family while cultivating a rented farm.

By 1930, John’s son Cain Walls had married Lela Mae Holden. The 1930 census records Cain as owning the farm on which he worked; however, by the 1940 census, both the farm and the family home were listed as rented, and his reported annual income was zero dollars.

== See also ==
- Slavery by Another Name
- Alice, a 2022 American crime thriller film set in the 1970s, based on the life of Mae Louise Wall Miller,
