= Robert "Free Bob" Vernon =

Former slave and landowner in Louisiana

Robert Vernon
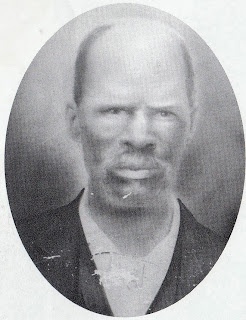
- Robert "Free Bob" Vernon
- Born: 1832; Rankin County, Mississippi
- Died: July 1915 (aged 82–83); Vernon Town, Louisiana

Robert "Free Bob" Vernon was born into slavery in 1832 in Rankin County, Mississippi. He cultivated cotton and later purchased his freedom.

In 1867, he acquired approximately 2,300 acres of land in Roseland, Louisiana, in Tangipahoa Parish. He donated four acres of land to establish Mt. Canaan Missionary Baptist Church, its school and cemetery for the local Black community.

Upon his death in July 1915, he transferred 100 acres surrounding the church site to each of his seventeen children. For more than a century, that settlement has been known as "Vernon Town" and his descendants have lived on the land on or near Vernon Town Road. They have served as prominent leaders, ministers, and elected officials in the parish.

Vernon's land donation, succession papers, and property deeds are archived at the Center for the South at Southeastern Louisiana University. Genealogist Antoinette Harrell uncovered Vernon's legacy after years of researching the family's lineage and connection to Vernon Town.
