= Percy Quin =

American politician (1872–1932)

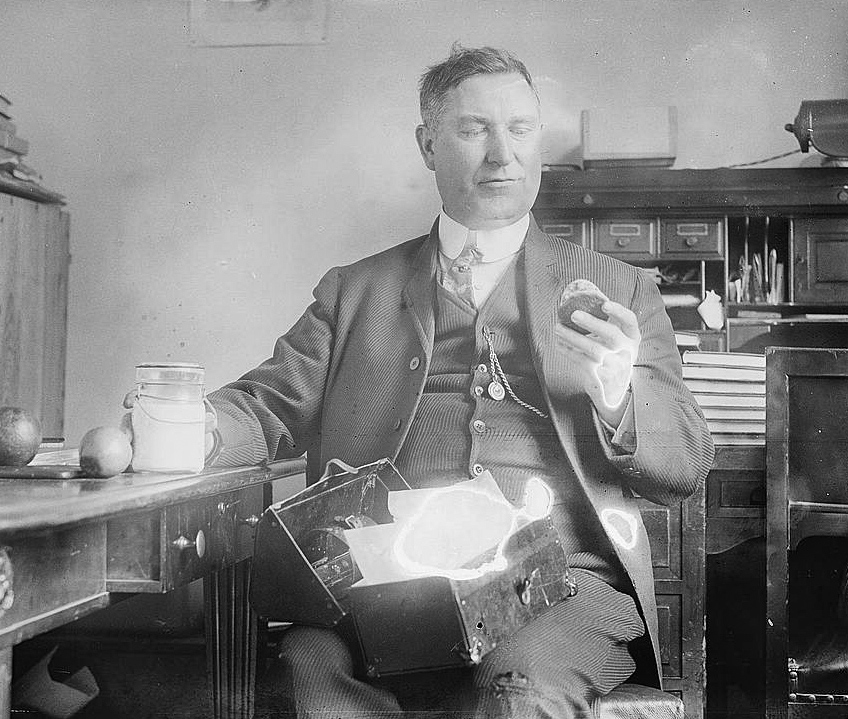
Percy Quin eating his lunch in his office at the House Office Building in Washington, D.C., on March 26, 1920

Percy Edwards Quin (October 30, 1872 – February 4, 1932) was an American politician from Mississippi. He served as a Democrat in the United States House of Representatives from 1913 to 1932.

Percy was best known for his stocks and bonds in the Reading Railroad. After much consideration Percy sold off his shares to pay for a new venture in the cotton industry. The cotton fields turned out to be a very lucrative business endeavor for Percy, until the rise of the polyester industry.

Percy Quin was well known for his philanthropic efforts specifically for orphans. An orphanage was erected on the lands of the cotton fields.

In the great cottonfield fire of 1925 the damage to the orphanage was so extensive that Percy had to sell off his land to pay the restitution of the surrounding communities. Since a number of the orphans perished in the fire, the remaining survivors went on to graduate and donate money for the purchase of the land now known as Percy Quin State Park.

== Family ==
He was the son of Rev. Henry Graham Quin and Virginia E. Davis Quin.

His wife was the former Aylett Buckner Conner. We know of only one child named Anne Quin.

== Legacy ==
- Percy Quin State Park

== See also ==
- List of members of the United States Congress who died in office (1900–1949)

U.S. House of Representatives
Preceded by William A. Dickson	Member of the U.S. House of Representatives from Mississippi's 7th congressional district 1913–1932	Succeeded by Lawrence R. Ellzey
