= Kentwood, Louisiana =

- Town
- Town of Kentwood
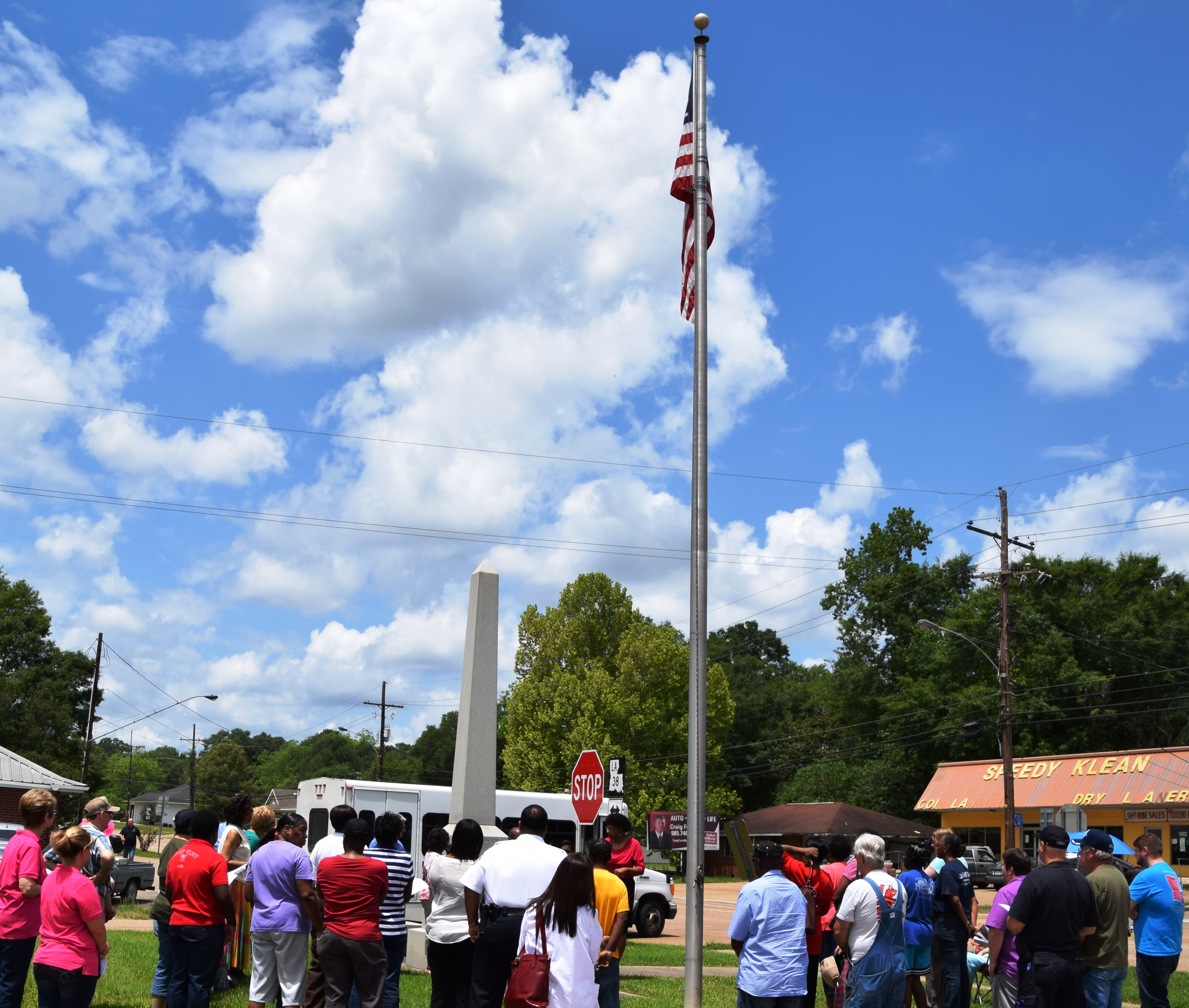
- Kentwood residents observe a noontide Day of Prayer in front of the Town Hall in 2015
- Motto: "The Foyer of Louisiana"
- Location of Kentwood in Tangipahoa Parish, Louisiana.

- Location of Louisiana in the United States
- Coordinates: 30°55′50″N 90°30′25″W
- Country: United States
- State: Louisiana
- Parish: Tangipahoa
- Founded: 1893

Area
  - Total: 7.11 sq mi (18.42 km^{2})
  - Land: 7.11 sq mi (18.42 km^{2})
  - Water: 0.0039 sq mi (0.01 km^{2})
- Elevation: 223 ft (68 m)

Population (2020)
  - Total: 2,145
  - Density: 301.7/sq mi (116.48/km^{2})
- Time zone: UTC−06:00 (CST)
  - Summer (DST): UTC−05:00 (CDT)
- ZIP code: 70444
- Area code: 985
- FIPS code: 22-39545
- GNIS feature ID: 2405939

Kentwood is a rural town in Tangipahoa Parish, Louisiana, United States, near the Mississippi state line. As of the 2020 census, Kentwood had a population of 2,145. It is part of the Hammond MSA. Kentwood is best known as the hometown of singer Britney Spears.

== History ==
The Postmaster named the town in honor of Amos Kent on February 29, 1888. Kent was born in 1811 in New Hampshire and relocated to Louisiana in 1828. He landed in New Orleans, but moved to Baton Rouge, where he established a mercantile business. Kent relocated to Tangipahoa Parish after the Civil War, where he assisted in laying out the town in an area that had been cleared of pine trees. Kent died on January 31, 1906.

On August 30, 2012, damage was caused by pressure on the 2,300 foot Percy Quin dam, a dam on the Tangipahoa River north of Kentwood, as a result of Hurricane Isaac, led to Louisiana Governor Bobby Jindal calling for a mandatory evacuation of the town due to fears of large-scale flooding from Lake Tangipahoa. The evacuation order, which was amended twice, was later rescinded as the dam held. The lake was drawn down so repairs could be made.

The 490-acre Lake Tangipahoa, which opened in 1939 and is located six miles south of McComb, Mississippi, was reopened in 2016. Repairs had been completed in 2014 and the lake restocked.

== Geography ==
According to the United States Census Bureau, the town has a total area of 6.9 square miles (18 km^{2}), of which 6.9 square miles (18 km^{2}) is land and 0.14% is water.

== Demographics ==
Historical population
Census	Pop.	Note	%±
1900	1,313		—
1910	3,609		174.9%
1920	3,059		−15.2%
1930	1,726		−43.6%
1940	1,854		7.4%
1950	2,417		30.4%
1960	2,607		7.9%
1970	2,736		4.9%
1980	2,667		−2.5%
1990	2,468		−7.5%
2000	2,205		−10.7%
2010	2,198		−0.3%
2020	2,145		−2.4%
2025 (est.)	2,217	▲	3.4%
U.S. Decennial Census

Kentwood racial composition as of 2020
Race	Number	Percentage
White (non-Hispanic)	414	19.3%
Black or African American (non-Hispanic)	1,642	76.55%
Native American	1	0.05%
Asian	4	0.19%
Other/Mixed	60	2.8%
Hispanic or Latino	24	1.12%

As of the 2020 United States census, there were 2,145 people, 771 households, and 421 families residing in the town.

== Education ==
Tangipahoa Parish School Board operates public schools:

- Kentwood High Magnet School (7-12)
- O. W. Dillon Memorial Elementary School (K-6)
- Chesbrough Elementary (K-5)
- Spring Creek Elementary (K-5)
- Jewel M. Sumner Middle and High School

== Notable people ==
- Roger Ballard, country music singer-songwriter
- Little Brother Montgomery (1906–85), jazz pianist
- Clay Shaw (1913–74), New Orleans businessman and the only person prosecuted in connection with the assassination of President John F. Kennedy. He was acquitted.
- Paul Gayten (1920-1991), R&B pianist, songwriter, record producer
- Jackie Smith (born 1940), National Football League tight end and member of the Pro Football Hall of Fame
- Collis Temple (born 1952), first African-American athlete at Louisiana State University
- Stacy Head (born 1969), New Orleans elected official born in nearby Greensburg but associated with Kentwood
- Michael "Mike" Jackson (1969–2017), former National Football League wide receiver
- Ann Alexander Smith, Louisiana educator
- Britney Spears (born 1981), singer, songwriter, dancer, and actress

== See also ==
- Camp Moore - a Confederate training base near Kentwood, now a museum.
- WEMX
