= Lawrence R. Ellzey =

American politician (1891–1977)

Lawrence Russell Ellzey

Member of the U.S. House of Representatives from Mississippi's 7th district
- In office March 15, 1932 – January 3, 1935
- Preceded by: Percy Quin
- Succeeded by: Dan R. McGehee

Personal details
- Born: March 20, 1891 Wesson, Mississippi, U.S.
- Died: December 7, 1977 (aged 86) Jackson, Mississippi, U.S.
- Resting place: Wesson Cemetery, Wesson, Mississippi, U.S.
- Party: Democratic

Lawrence Russell Ellzey (March 20, 1891 – December 7, 1977) was a U.S. representative from Mississippi. He also served as president of a junior college. He was a Democrat.

== Education ==
Born on a farm near Wesson, Mississippi, Ellzey attended the rural schools and was graduated from Mississippi College at Clinton, A.B., 1912. He attended the University of Chicago in 1927. He became a teacher in the consolidated county schools of Mississippi between 1912 and 1917.

== Wartime ==
He volunteered as a private in the Quartermaster Corps on December 13, 1917, and served overseas nine months before being discharged as a first lieutenant on February 20, 1919.

== Career in education ==
He served as superintendent of education of Lincoln County, Mississippi from 1920 to 1922. He was a teacher in the agricultural high school in Wesson from 1922 to 1928. He served as president of Copiah-Lincoln Junior College in Wesson, Mississippi from 1928 to 1932.

== Career in politics ==
Ellzey was elected as a Democrat to the Seventy-second Congress by special election on March 15, 1932, to fill the vacancy caused by the death of Percy Quin. He was reelected to the Seventy-third Congress and served from March 15, 1932, until January 3, 1935. He was an unsuccessful candidate for renomination in 1934 to the Seventy-fourth Congress.

== Later employment ==
He later was employed in the life insurance industry. He worked as an executive secretary for the Mississippi Salvage Campaign from 1942 to 1943.

== Death ==
Ellzey died in Jackson, Mississippi on December 7, 1977, aged 86, and was interred in Wesson Cemetery, Wesson, Mississippi.

U.S. House of Representatives
| Preceded by Percy Quin | Member of the U.S. House of Representatives from Mississippi's 7th congressional district 1932–1935 | Succeeded by Dan R. McGehee |
