= Mount Canaan Missionary Baptist Church of Arcola =

Historic African American church

Coordinates: 30°47′46″N 90°27′56″W

Mt. Canaan Missionary Baptist Church of Arcola is a historic African-American Baptist church in Tangipahoa Parish, Louisiana.

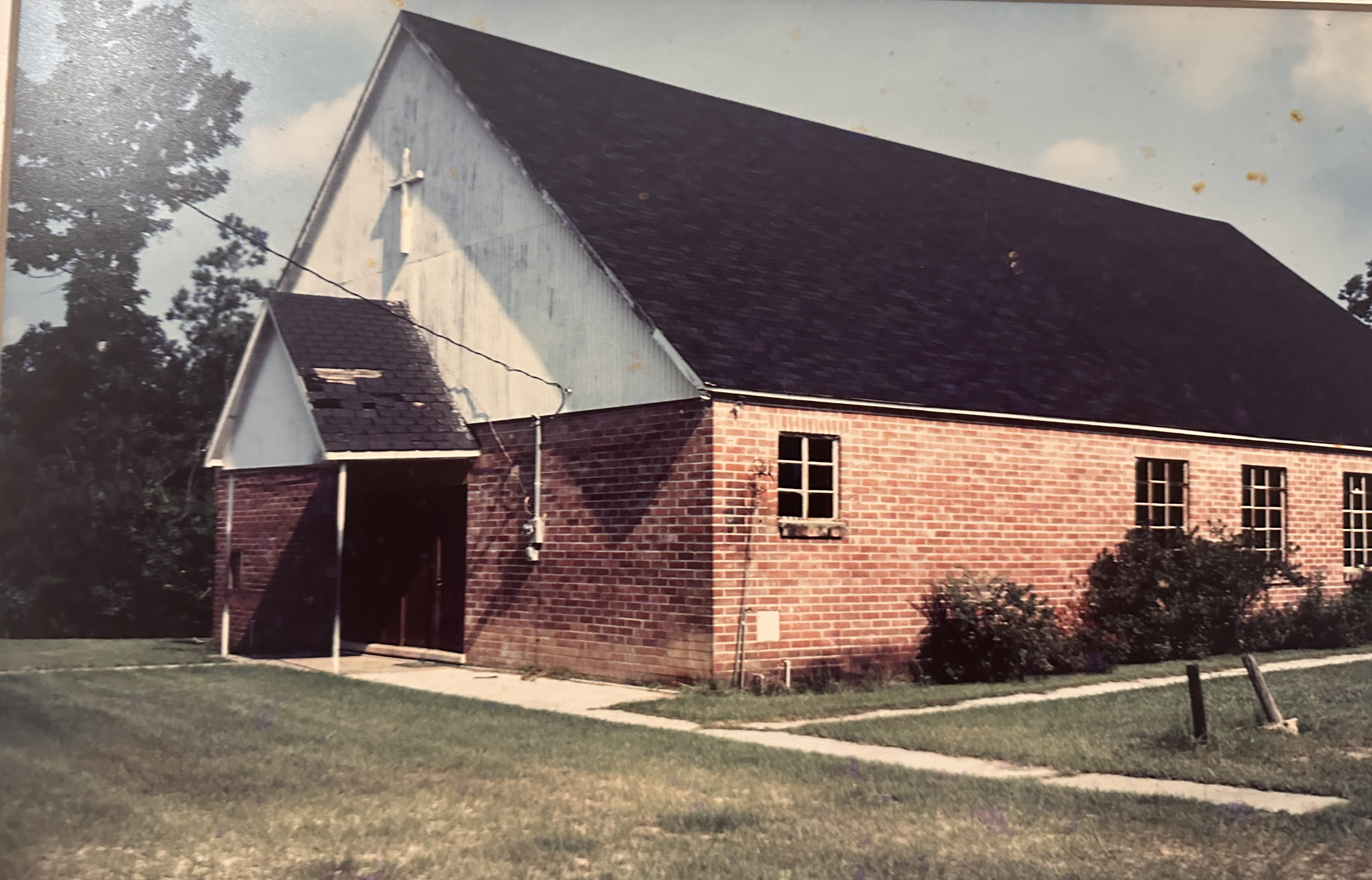
Mt. Canaan Baptist Church of Arcola

The church was organized in 1869—during the Reconstruction Era— in a log cabin situated on property across Big Creek in Roseland. Reconstruction was a period in which formerly enslaved Black Americans formed independent churches as centers of worship, education, and self-governance.,

== Land Donation by Robert “Free Bob” Vernon ==
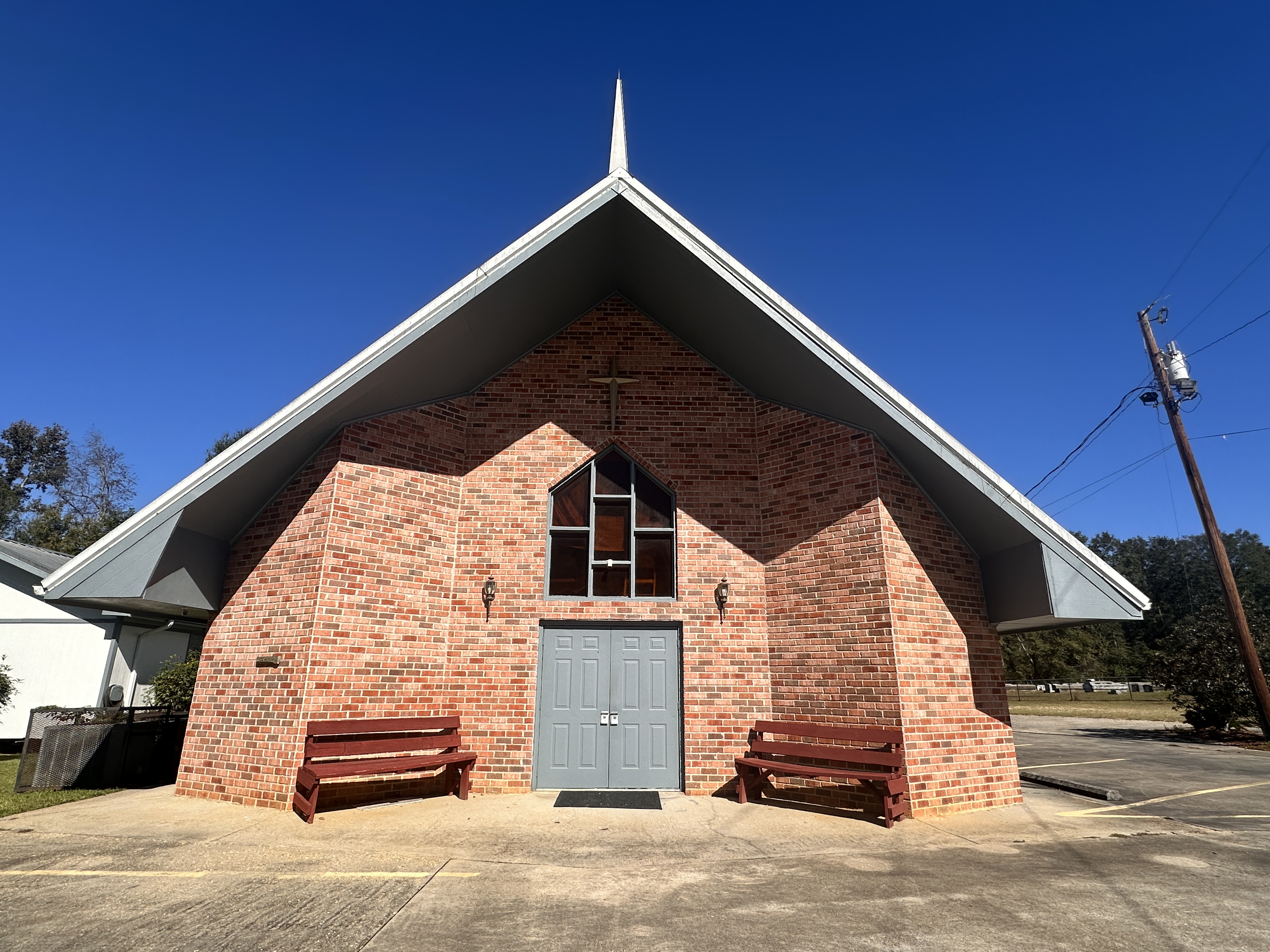
Mt. Canaan Missionary Baptist Church of Arcola built in 1988.

Robert "Free Bob" Vernon was born into slavery in 1832 in Rankin County, Mississippi. He cultivated cotton and later purchased his freedom. In 1867, he acquired approximately 2,300 acres of land in Tangipahoa Parish. Vernon donated four acres of land to establish Mt. Canaan Missionary Baptist Church, Mt. Canaan School, and Mt. Canaan Missionary Baptist Church Cemetery which were organized by Rev. M. Allen. Upon his death in July 1915, in Tangipahoa Parish, Robert "Free Bob" Vernon transferred 100 acres surrounding the church site to each of his seventeen children,. For more than a century, that settlement has been known as “Vernon Town”^{,} and the descendants have lived on the land, as prominent leaders, ministers, and elected officials in the parish. The church is less than 3 miles from Vernon Town Road.

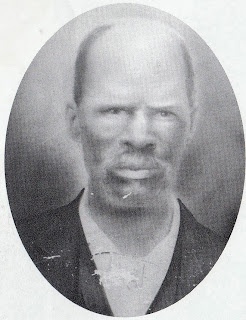
Robert "Free Bob" Vernon as presented in the Center for South Louisiana, Southeastern Louisiana University archives

== Segregated Church, School, and Cemetery ==
Mt. Canaan Missionary Baptist Church has historically been associated with Baptist denominational organizations connected to Black American congregations, including the Louisiana Freedmen Missionary Baptist General Association which was established in 1868, and the National Baptist Convention USA movement of the late nineteenth and early twentieth centuries. In 2026, Mt. Canaan held membership with the Third District Bogue Chitto Baptist Association and the Louisiana Home & Foreign Mission Baptist Convention Inc.

In 1896, Tangipahoa Parish established a school district; however, education was denied to Black residents. During this era of racial segregation, the church operated a one-room school--known as Mt. Canaan School-- which functioned as the sole local educational institution for Black children. Local newspapers, The Louisiana Weekly and Tangi Talk, often published highlights of the students' success.

The Mt. Canaan Missionary Baptist Church Cemetery continues to offer burial services in Roseland, Louisiana. The church maintains the grounds for ongoing interments. Robert "Free Bob" is buried there. Cemetery records and funeral programs are preserved in the Richardson Funeral Home Collection at Southeastern Louisiana University

In the early 1950s, during the pastorate of Reverend D. J. Johnson, the congregation constructed its first modern church building. The structure was designed by Louis Vernon, great grandson of "Free Bob," an architect and 1952 graduate of Howard University.

== A Division within the Congregation ==
Between 1982 and 1984, a division occurred within the congregation, and separate entities were incorporated as Mt. Canaan Baptist Church of Roseland and Mt. Canaan Baptist Church of Arcola Inc.

Mt. Canaan Baptist Church of Arcola Inc. became the “successor of the original church organization and its property” according to articles of incorporation filed with the Louisiana Secretary of State on January 31, 1986. A month before, on December 7, 1985, Robert Vernon Jr. and others registered articles of incorporation in Tangipahoa Parish to establish the new church.

In 1988, Marvin A. Vernon, Free Bob’s grandson, donated land for the construction of Mt. Canaan Baptist Church of Acola Inc. The new church was built and dedicated in August 1989 at 15727 Highway 10 in Roseland, Louisiana, across the street from the original church building.

Church records are archived at the Center for South Louisiana at Southeastern Louisiana University. With the assistance of the Untold History Foundation and historian Antoinette Harrell, the church received national historical marker in 2026.
