= Louisiana State University Agricultural Center =

Agriculture research center in Baton Rouge, Louisiana

Coordinates: 30.4145°N 91.1783°W

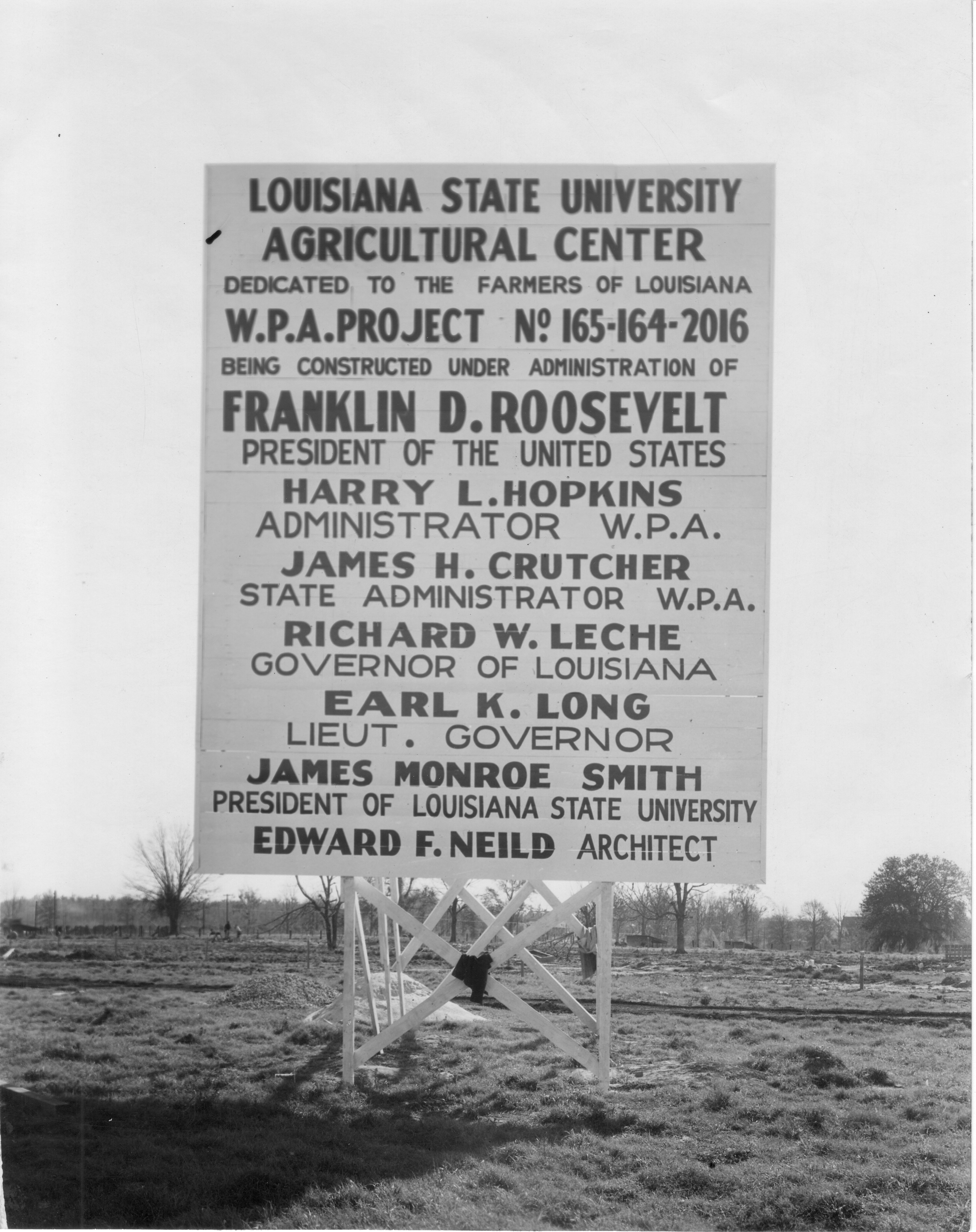
Works Progress Administration construction sign for the Agricultural Center at Louisiana State University (1936)

The Louisiana State University Agricultural Center, or the LSU AgCenter, is an agriculture research center associated with the Louisiana State University System and headquartered in Baton Rouge, Louisiana. The center conducts agricultural-based research through its Louisiana Agricultural Experiment Station and extends the knowledge derived from research to the people of the state of Louisiana through its Louisiana Cooperative Extension Service. The LSU AgCenter, one of 11 institutions within the Louisiana State University System, shares physical facilities with the LSU A&M campus.

== Structure ==
The LSU AgCenter is headed by a chancellor who reports to the president of the LSU system. Two vice chancellors, one for research and one for extension, report to the chancellor. The vice chancellor for research is also the director of the Louisiana Agricultural Experiment Station; the vice chancellor for extension is also director of the Louisiana Cooperative Extension Service. Many of the researchers and extension specialists who work at the center also have joint appointments in departments within LSU's College of Agriculture.

=== Louisiana Agricultural Experiment Stations ===
The Louisiana Agricultural Experiment Station includes 20 research stations across the state at which the research necessary for agricultural enterprises to be profitable in the unique environments of each area is conducted. The research stations and locations are: Aquaculture, Botanic Gardens at Burden and Central, all in Baton Rouge; Calhoun in Calhoun; Coastal Area in Port Sulphur; Dean Lee in Alexandria; Hammond near Robert east of Hammond; Hill Farm in Homer; Iberia in Jeanerette; Bob R. Jones Idlewild in Clinton; Macon Ridge in Winnsboro; Northeast in St. Joseph; Pecan in Shreveport; Red River in Bossier City; Reproductive Biology and Sugar in St. Gabriel; Rice in Crowley; Rosepine in Rosepine; Southeast in Franklinton; and Sweet Potato in Chase.

Three of the experimental stations began to close and be phased out in 2011 due to budget cuts. The Coastal Area Research Station in Plaquemines Parish, the Rosepine Research Station in Vernon Parish and the 400 acre Calhoun Research Station (80 acres owned by Agcenter) established in 1888 in Ouachita Parish, were chosen.

=== Louisiana Cooperative Extension Service ===
The Louisiana Cooperative Extension Service includes offices in all of Louisiana's 64 parishes. Educational opportunities offered through these offices include online and in-person classes, seminars, workshops, field days, publications and news releases. In addition, extension agents provide one-on-one advice and, increasingly, use the Internet to disseminate educational information. Topics covered include agriculture and natural resources; lawns and gardens; environmental protection and resource conservation; family life; health and nutrition; housing and emergency preparedness; and youth development through the 4-H program.

== Areas of focus ==
=== Crop adaptability ===
The subtropical climate is not only conducive to crop growth, but also to proliferation of unwanted insects, weeds and diseases. Controlling pests is an ongoing struggle and requires a continuous supply of new crop varieties, new integrated pest management tools, and strategies. Center scientists developed the crop varieties that can be successfully grown in Louisiana, and they developed the tools and strategies to control pests in the most cost-effective, environmentally beneficial manner. The center extension educators are on the front lines in every parish getting this information into the hands of the food and fiber producers.

=== Alternative fuels ===
The LSU AgCenter is engaged in a broad array of bioenergy/biofuel research and extension activities. With the goal of identifying and evaluating bioenergy production technologies that can be economically feasible in Louisiana on a commercial scale, research activities are focused on: (1) feedstock development and evaluation and (2) feedstock processing and bioenergy production. Research activities in feedstock development include evaluation of potential feedstock crops such as high-fiber sugarcane, sweet sorghum, switchgrass and sweet potatoes for ethanol production as well as a variety of oilseed crops and other feedstocks for biodiesel production. Feedstock processing and bioenergy production research covers a range of scientific investigation including gasification and cellulose conversion technologies.

=== Coastal restoration ===
Maintaining and restoring Louisiana's coastline is important to Louisiana and the United States. The Louisiana coast is a gateway to Central and South America and a corridor for oil and gas. The LSU AgCenter's part in the restoration effort includes developing coastal plant varieties that can proliferate rapidly. Acceleration of plant production requires fast seeding and efficient harvesting. These new varieties must be able to hold on to the land and keep it from washing out to sea.

=== Functional foods ===
Development of functional foods is the largest and fastest growing segment of the food industry. Functional foods are foods that have been enhanced to provide additional health benefits beyond basic nutritional value. Functional foods add value to the food production industry and create economic development opportunities for Louisiana. Ingredients for functional foods come from plant sources, dairy products, animal byproducts, fishery waste and aquatic resources. LSU AgCenter researchers have patented an array of functional foods from Louisiana products including alligator, rice, garlic, blueberries, muscadine, mayhaw, black drum, soybeans, oysters and crawfish. These products are poised to boost economic opportunity in the state and improve individual health.

=== Childhood obesity ===
The LSU AgCenter is attacking the societal problem of obesity by aiming at children. Through the Smart Bodies program, children all over the state are exposed to educational information about eating properly and getting exercise through a school enrichment program. By going through the Body Walk exhibit, children learn about the human anatomy and the effects food has on the body. Research indicates the comprehensive program is making a difference. Children are learning to change to a healthier lifestyle and are passing the information on to their parents.

=== Sustainable housing ===
The LSU AgCenter's Louisiana Home and Landscape Resource Center, also known as LaHouse, provides a model for how to build sustainable housing in the Deep South. It's a family-friendly, energy-efficient house designed to stand up to hurricane-force winds, swarming insects and harmful humidity. LaHouse showcases innovations in home construction for Louisiana's sub-tropical climate. Ongoing activities include tours and seminars for builders and consumers on topics ranging from construction of storm-safe housing to environmentally friendly home landscaping.

=== Rural initiatives ===
Rural Louisiana includes some of the poorest parishes (counties) in the United States. To enhance economic opportunity in these impoverished areas, the LSU AgCenter has established the Delta Rural Development Center in Oak Grove in the northeastern corner of the state. Educational programs offered include leadership training, workshops on grant writing, entrepreneurship for teens and how to do business on the Internet. AgCenter experts have helped establish agro-tourism businesses, farmers’ markets and community betterment associations.

=== 4-H support ===
The center plays an integral role in supporting agricultural industries, enhancing the environment, and improving the quality of life through its 4-H youth, family and consumer sciences, and community development programs. In 2008, Louisiana celebrated 100 years of 4-H in the state. The 4-H program, which got its start with a boys’ corn club in 1908, reaches nearly 225,000 youth every year. The main focus areas are citizenship, healthy living, and science, engineering and technology, along with additional focus areas of environmental education, wetland education, shooting sports safety, fashion, and livestock and rural development. Among alumni of Louisiana 4-H are General Russel L. Honoré, who achieved fame in coming to the aid of Hurricane Katrina victims in New Orleans, Todd Graves, founder of Raising Cane’s Chicken Fingers, and Kent Desormeaux, the jockey who twice nearly won the Triple Crown in horse racing. More than half of the state legislators in a 2008 survey said they had participated in 4-H. In 2022, the Louisiana 4-H program celebrated the 100th summer at its summer camp facility, the Grant Walker 4-H Educational Center in Pollock, Louisiana.
