= Arthur Tasker =

Black, Louisiana mayor

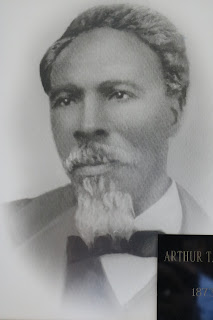
Rev. Arthur Tasker, Black Reconstruction mayor of Ponchatoula, LA

Arthur Tasker (1834 - unknown) was a preacher and the first Black American to be elected mayor of Ponchatoula.

== Early life ==
Tasker was born in 1834 in Maryland as a slave. He was later sold to work for widow McCarroll in Tangipahoa Parish, Louisiana. As a slave, Tasker was hired out to work for William Akers, a timber man with more than 1,000 acres who founded the city of Ponchatoula in 1820.

== Leadership ==
After being freed in 1863, Arthur Tasker began preaching the Gospel to the newly freed people in Tangipahoa, as part of the growing African Methodist Episcopal churches being established across the United States. AME churches emerged from the Free African Society and were founded so that Black people could worship God without experiencing racism. leaders like Tasker believed in the power of education and wanted their descendants to be educated.

On October 12, 1867, Tasker founded the African Methodist Episcopal Church, Zion, in Ponchatoula, Louisiana. Less than ten miles away in Hammond, Louisiana, Charles Daggs, a former slave, founded Greater St. James Church in the same year. In of Donaldsonville, Louisiana, Pierre Caliste Landry, founded St. Peter's Methodist Episcopal Church and in 1868 he was unanimously elected Mayor, making him the first Black American to be elected mayor of Ponchatoula. The growth of AME churches in slave states like Louisiana was considered "remarkable."

During the Reconstruction Era, Tasker gained the reputation as one of Ponchatoula's most prominent "Freedmen". On May 10, 1870, he earned "elder's orders" from the Committee on Holy Orders within the African Methodist Zion Episcopal Connection Louisiana Conference.

Tasker led his church members to petition for and receive permission from the town leaders to purchase half the public square for $25 in August 1873. There, he established African Methodist Episcopal Church, Zion, in what is now Kiwanis Park in Ponchatoula. The church was the first school for many Black Americans in rural town across the states.

While Black voters were being massacred for political engagement in the state, Tasker became mayor of Ponchatoula September 13, 1873, succeeding Eldred J. White Sr. Tasker was 39.

A Ponchatoula council meeting in October 1873 confirmed that the town had previously donated the square for the use of the church, and a church building, school, and cemetery were present. The papers donating the square were said to be lost by Oct. 1873 so the exact date of the donation of the square to the church is uncertain.

Tasker served as mayor from September 3, 1873, to January 6, 1874, and possibly longer; The town's minute books from May 1874 until June 1877 are missing, so it is not known who was mayor during this period.

On July 14, 1874, in Hammond, Louisiana, a large number of Republicans of Tangipahoa Parish assembled at the African Methodist Episcopal Church. The meeting was called to order by the Rev. Charles Daggs and Arthur Tasker, who opened the meeting with prayer. According to published meeting resolutions in the New Orleans Republican, the meeting denounced J.B. Wands who attempted to establish an Executive Committee of the parish naming himself as president. Wands committee was called "bogus" and a fraud for "trying to have control of our political affairs and for usurping power not granted him by the Republican clubs." Wands also failed "to have colored men commissioned after they were duly elected from this parish and for having Democrats commissioned instead." The meeting ended with the men organizing a Parish Executive Committee with Tasker as president and Parker Loving, Albert Potter, Charles Daggs, and Louis Baham as vice presidents.

Tasker, later, represented the parish committee on August 5, 1874, at the Republican State Convention as an alternative delegate of Tangipahoa parish.

On June 1, 1876, Tasker attended the Fourteenth Session of the General Conference of the African Methodist Episcopal Zion Church assembled in the Fifteenth Street Church, Louisville, Kentucky. He served on the Committee on Credentials of ministerial and lay delegates. He represented the Louisiana Conference along with H. P. Tayler, James Allen, S. Humphries, Frank Loney, J. P. Brown; and lay delegates Anderson Aaron, J. Davis, T. Henry, H. M. Cephas.

In June 1877, the former enslaver and police juror William Akers became mayor of Ponchatoula while Tasker served on the town council. Tasker resigned from the council at the beginning of 1878.

== Family ==
Arthur Tasker married Sarah Smith (born ca. 1840 in Virginia). Their first child, Mary, was born in 1863, the year of emancipation. According to the 1870 census, the Taskers had four children Mary, David, Clinton, and Harriet. By the 1880 census, they had four more daughters Levina, Amma, Lois, and Augusta. Their marriage was certified on January 25, 1887.

Tasker's son, Clinton, was elected to the Town Council in the City of Ponchatoula, Louisiana, in 1888 and lead the church. In 1895, Clinton Tasker was one of nine trustees of the African Methodist Episcopal Church, Zion, who negotiated the purchase of a square block of land at 490 South Sixth Street for the establishment of a new and enlarged church.

== Death and legacy ==
Tasker is buried in the church's cemetery in Kiwanis Park on Ash Street. Louisiana started statewide registration for births and deaths in 1914, so records of his death is not available.

On June 30, 1963, the African Methodist Episcopal Zion Chapel was rebuilt and rededicated as Tasker African Methodist Episcopal Zion Chapel (also known as Tasker's Chapel Memorial) at 220 W Ash St, Ponchatoula, by the Rev. R.L. Walker along with trustees Robert Ely, chairman; James Elliott, secretary; Sylvester Callahan, treasurer; Napoleon Austin, Vernon Haney, Edward Dabney, Harvey Kemp, Eugene Brown, Clinton Williams, R.L. Walker, and Adolph Watts.

The Fourth Street city park in Ponchatoula is named Tasker Memorial Park. In 2023, city officials budgeted $10,000 for park upgrade.

In March 2023, historian Antoinette Harrell, Ponchatoula city councilwoman Roslind Batiste of District B, Ponchatoula historian Jim Perrin, and Eddie Ponds, The Drum founding publisher, formed the Arthur Tasker Committee. The committee and the History Untold Foundation LLC curated files and indexed records to establish the Rev. Arthur Tasker historical collection at the Southeastern University Center for Southeast Louisiana Studies on April 8, 2024.

On May 17, 2024, the State of Louisiana Office of Tourism and the National Register of Historic Places erected a historic marker in Kiwanis Park near his burial site in Ponchatoula.
