= Roger Ballard (singer-songwriter) =

American country music singer-songwriter

- Born: Kentwood, Louisiana
- Genre: Country
- Occupation: Singer-songwriter
- Years active: 1990–1993
- Labels: Swamp Pop, Atlantic

Roger Ballard (born in Kentwood, Louisiana) is an American country music singer-songwriter. His first single was "A Cheap Imitation of You" on the Swamp Pop label in 1990.

Ballard was signed to Atlantic Records, who released his debut album, A Little Piece of Heaven, on September 21, 1993. His single "Two Steps in the Right Direction" peaked at number 68 on the Billboard Hot Country Singles & Tracks chart. Larry Flick of Billboard called the song "a western swing therapy session."

As of November 2017, Ballard was cited working as Dolly Parton's Stampede's emcee in Pigeon Forge, TN, and hosted several shows annually, including Ashville's Christmas Show in North Carolina in 2017. He currently resides in Seiverville, TN with his wife.

== Discography ==
=== Studio albums ===
Title	Album details	Peak positions
Title	Album details	US Country
A Little Piece of Heaven	Release date: September 21, 1993; Label: Atlantic Records	—

=== Singles ===
Year	Single	Peak positions
Year	Single	US Country
1990	"A Cheap Imitation of You"	—
1993	"A Little Piece of Heaven"	—
1993	"Two Steps in the Right Direction"	68
1993	"You Can't Get There from Here"	—
"—" denotes releases that did not chart

=== Music videos ===
Year	Video	Director
1993	"A Little Piece of Heaven"	Marc Ball
