= Alice (2022 film) =

2022 American film by Krystin Ver Linden

- Theatrical release poster
- Directed by: Krystin Ver Linden
- Written by: Krystin Ver Linden
- Produced by: Peter Lawson
- Starring: Keke Palmer; Common; Jonny Lee Miller; Gaius Charles; Alicia Witt
- Cinematography: Alex Disenhof
- Edited by: Byron Smith
- Music by: Common
- Production companies: Stampede Ventures; Steel Springs Pictures
- Distributed by: Roadside Attractions Vertical Entertainment (United States); Universal Pictures (International)
- Release dates: January 23, 2022 (Sundance); March 18, 2022 (United States)
- Running time: 100 minutes
- Country: United States
- Language: English
- Budget: $16–23 million
- Box office: $373,043

Alice is a 2022 American crime thriller film set in the 1970s, based on the life of Mae Louise Wall Miller, written and directed by Krystin Ver Linden, in her directorial debut. The film stars Keke Palmer, Jonny Lee Miller, Common, Gaius Charles, and Alicia Witt.

Alice had its world premiere at the 2022 Sundance Film Festival on January 23, 2022, and was released in the United States on March 18, 2022, by Roadside Attractions and Vertical Entertainment. The film received mixed reviews from critics. It was nominated in three categories for the NAACP Image Awards, and nominated for the Saturn Award for best independent film.

== Synopsis ==
Alice is enslaved on a 19th-century style plantation in Georgia, owned by Paul Bennet. Attempting to escape, she runs through a vast forest and emerges onto a Georgia highway in 1973. She meets Frank, a truck driver who helps her adjust to the truth of the time period, and that she has been misled her whole life. After reading some books explaining when and how all other plantations ended, and tracking down Rachel, the ex-wife of her "owner," she is able to convince Frank about the plantation. Inspired by Pam Grier's character in the film Coffy, she persuades Frank to go back with her, so that she can exact revenge on Bennet and free the rest of the "domestics" being held there.

== Cast ==
- Keke Palmer as Alice
- Common as Frank
- Jonny Lee Miller as Paul Bennett
- Gaius Charles as Joseph
- Alicia Witt as Rachel
- Madelon Curtis as Mrs. Bennett
- Jaxon Goldenberg as Daniel Bennett
- Kenneth Farmer as Moses
- Natasha Williams as Ruth
- Craig Stark as Aaron

== Production ==
In September 2019, it was announced Krystin Ver Linden would direct and write the film. The publicity for the film states that it is "inspired by the true events of a woman of servitude in 1800s Georgia, who escapes the 55-acre confines of her captor to discover the shocking reality that exists beyond the tree line ... it's 1973." Elements of the film's background are loosely based on the narrative of Mae Louise Miller, who escaped from slavery in the 1960s.

In June 2020, Keke Palmer, Common, Jonny Lee Miller, and Sinqua Walls joined the cast of the film, with Palmer also serving as an executive producer. In November 2020, Gaius Charles and Alicia Witt joined the cast of the film.

Principal photography began in October 2020 in Savannah, Georgia.

== Release ==
It had its premiere at the 2022 Sundance Film Festival on January 23, 2022. Prior to, Roadside Attractions and Vertical Entertainment acquired distribution rights to the film.

== Reception ==
=== Box office ===
In the United States and Canada, the film earned $173,624 from 169 theaters in its opening weekend.

=== Critical response ===
On the review aggregator website Rotten Tomatoes, 29% of 70 critics' reviews are positive, with an average rating of 4.8/10. The website's consensus reads, "Alice's well-intentioned attempt to reckon with racism sadly misses the mark on multiple levels, although Keke Palmer's performance remains a consistent bright spot." Metacritic, which uses a weighted average, assigned the film a score of 47 out of 100, based on 19 critics, indicating "mixed or average" reviews.

=== Accolades ===
Accolades received by Black Panther: Wakanda Forever
Award	Date of ceremony	Category	Recipient(s)	Result	Ref.
Black Reel Awards	February 6, 2023	Outstanding Score	Common	Nominated	
NAACP Image Awards	February 25, 2023	Outstanding Writing in a Motion Picture	Krystin Ver Linden	Nominated	
NAACP Image Awards	February 25, 2023	Outstanding Breakthrough Creative in a Motion Picture	Krystin Ver Linden	Nominated	
NAACP Image Awards	February 25, 2023	Outstanding Actress in a Motion Picture	Keke Palmer	Nominated	
Palm Springs International Film Festival	January 13, 2023	Directors to Watch	Krystin Ver Linden	Won	
Saturn Awards	October 25, 2022	Best Independent Film	Alice	Nominated	
