= Sims Creek =

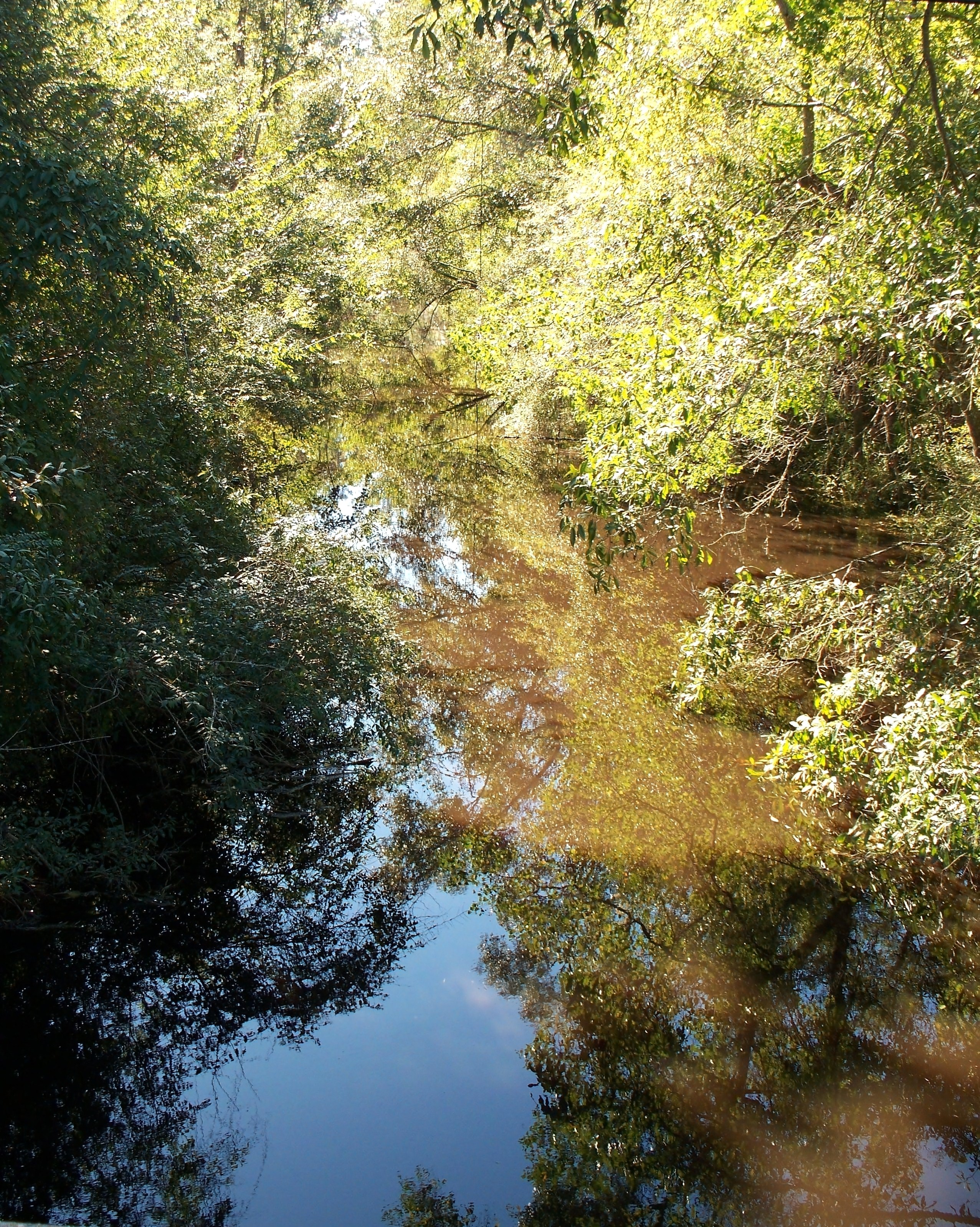
- Sims Creek as it flows west from the LA 445 bridge south of Robert.
- Sims Creek

Location
- Country: United States
- State: Louisiana
- Parish: Tangipahoa

Physical characteristics
- Source
  - coordinates: 30°29′24″N 90°19′26″W
- Mouth: Tangipahoa River
  - coordinates: 30°27′07″N 90°19′34″W
- Length: 4.7 miles (7.6 km)

Basin features
- Cities: Robert, Louisiana

Sims Creek is a 4.7-mile-long (7.6 km) tributary of the Tangipahoa River in the 8th Ward of Tangipahoa Parish, Louisiana. It flows generally southeast from near Robert, and is joined about halfway down its course by its longest tributary, P-Kaw-Shun Creek, which begins north of Lorraine and flows southwest, passing under US 190 and Interstate 12, to its confluence with Sims Creek. The main creek then continues southwest, passing under LA 445, and meets the Tangipahoa River 4 miles (6 km) south of Robert. The creek is part of the Lake Pontchartrain Basin and thus sensitive to its ecology. In 2007, the attorney general of Louisiana issued a legal opinion that a private fence could not lawfully be constructed across Sims Creek, because of its importance to public drainage.
