= Tangipahoa River =

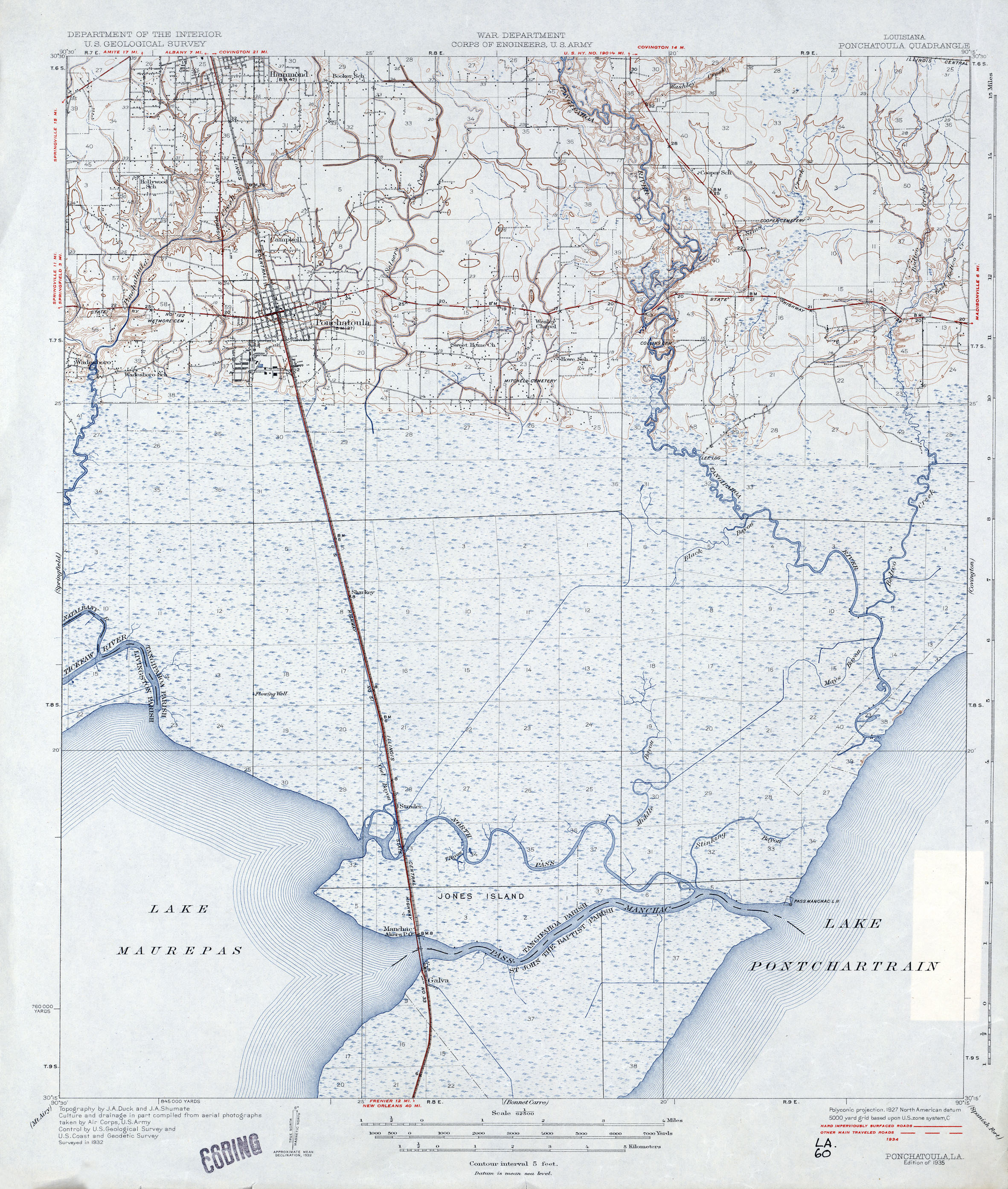
- Tangipahoa River

Location
- Country: United States
- States: Mississippi; Louisiana
- Counties: Pike; Amite; Lincoln
- Parish: Tangipahoa

Physical characteristics
- Source: Little Tangipahoa River
  - location: Osyka, Pike County, Mississippi
  - coordinates: 31°06′29″N 90°28′32″W
  - elevation: 269 ft (82 m)
- Mouth: Lake Pontchartrain
  - location: Southeast Ponchatoula, Tangipahoa Parish, Louisiana
  - coordinates: 30°20′12″N 90°16′26″W
  - elevation: −3 ft (−0.91 m)
- Length: 122 mi (196 km)

Basin features
- Cities: Osyka, Mississippi; Kentwood, Louisiana; Amite, Louisiana; Hammond, Louisiana; Robert, Louisiana; Ponchatoula, Louisiana

The Tangipahoa River (/tændʒɪpəˈhoʊ.ə/ tan-ji-pə-HOH-ə) originates northwest of McComb in southwest Mississippi, and runs south 122 miles (196 km) through Lake Tangipahoa in Percy Quin State Park before passing into southeast Louisiana. There it flows entirely in the eponymous Tangipahoa Parish until its mouth opens into the northwest region of Lake Pontchartrain.

The Tangipahoa River was named after the Tangipahoa Indians.

According to the Geographic Names Information System, the Tangipahoa River has also been known as:

- Rio Tanchipaho
- Taensapaoa River
- Tanchipaho River
- Tanchipao River
- Tandgepao River
- Tandgi-pao River
- Tangipaho River
- Tansypaho River
- Tanzipao River
- Taugipahoa River
- Tuckepaw River
- Big Tangipahoa River

== See also ==
- List of rivers of Mississippi
- Percy Quin State Park
- Sims Creek
- Tangipohoa People
- Tangipahoa, Louisiana
- Tangipahoa Parish, Louisiana
- Taensa People
- Tickfaw River
