= Percy Quin State Park =

State park in Mississippi, United States

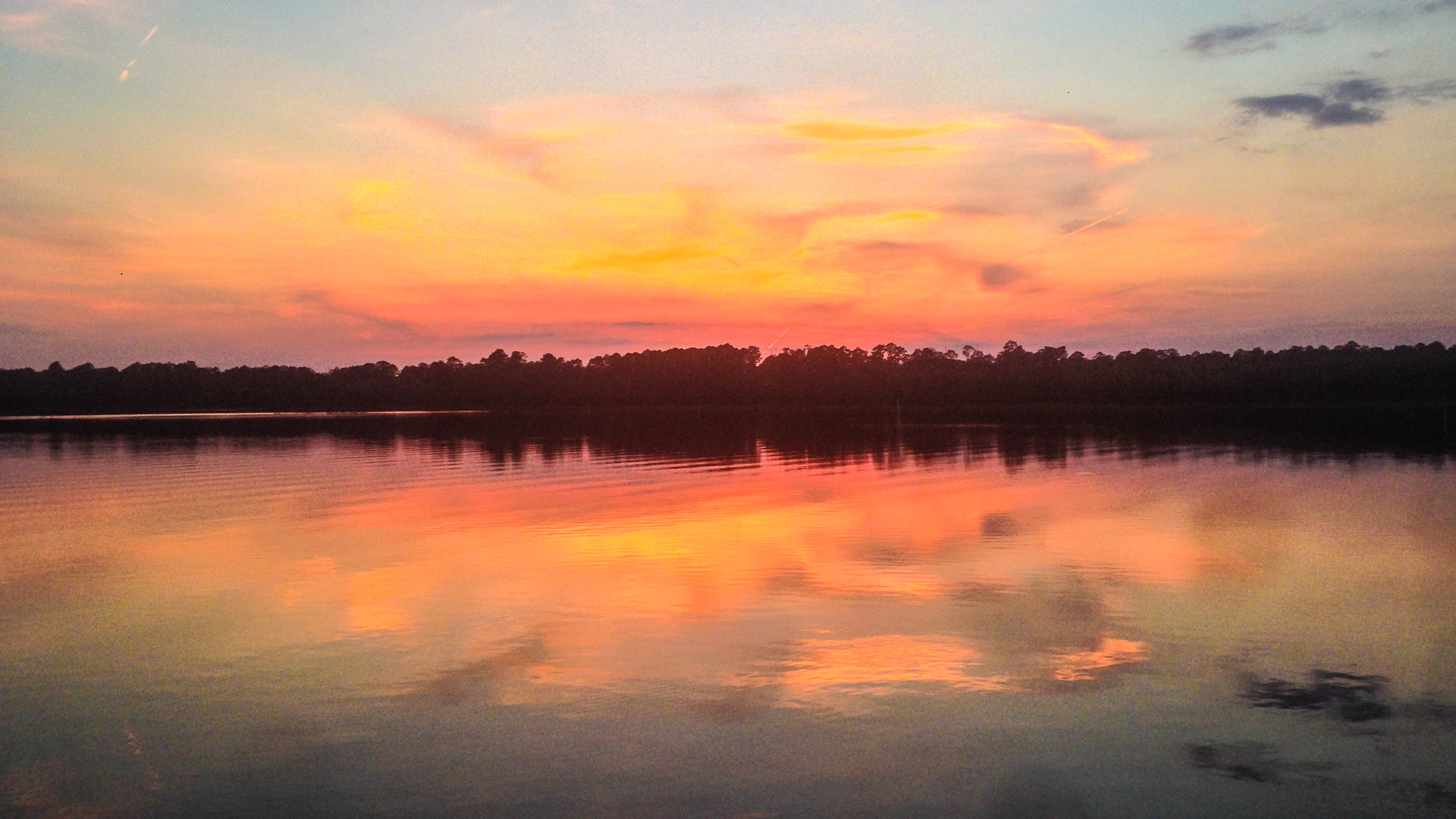
- Sunset at Percy Quin State Park, April 2017

- Location within Mississippi
- Location: Pike County, Mississippi, United States
- Coordinates: 31°11′31″N 90°34′02″W
- Elevation: 328 ft (100 m)
- Established: 1935
- Administrator: Mississippi Department of Wildlife, Fisheries, and Parks
- Designation: Mississippi state park
- Named for: U.S. Representative Percy Quin
- Website: Official website

Percy Quin State Park is a public recreation area located off Interstate 55, approximately 7 miles (11 km) southwest of McComb, Mississippi. The state park surrounds 490-acre (200 ha) Lake Tangipahoa, an impoundment of the Tangipahoa River.

== History ==
The park is one of the nine original state parks built in Mississippi by the Civilian Conservation Corps. Work on the park began in 1935, with the construction of the dam that created Lake Tangipahoa initiated in 1936. The park was named after Mississippi politician Percy Quin.

== Activities and amenities ==
The park features boating, waterskiing, and fishing, a conference center, primitive and developed campsites, cabins, villas, and lodge, a 4-mile (6.4 km) nature trail, a picnic area, and an 18-hole golf course, Quail Hollow.
