= Lake Tangipahoa Dam =

- Location within Mississippi
- Country: United States
- Location: Pike County, Mississippi
- Coordinates: 31°10′29″N 90°31′40″W
- Purpose: Recreation
- Status: Operational
- Opening date: 1940

Dam and spillways
- Height: 34 ft (10 m)
- Length: 2,300 ft (701 m)

Reservoir
- Total capacity: 4,841 acre⋅ft (5,971,286 m^{3})
- Catchment area: 56.8 mi^{2} (147 km^{2})
- Surface area: 554 acres (224 ha)

Lake Tangipahoa Dam is an embankment dam on the Tangipahoa River in Pike County, Mississippi. It forms Lake Tangipahoa within the Percy Quin State Park. The dam was completed in 1940 and in 1942 it failed. It was rebuilt in 1945 at a cost of $75,000. During the spring flood of 1983, the dam again failed and contributed to the flood records for the Tangipahoa River that stand today. The dam was rebuilt afterward and a concrete flood control structure was added. Heavy rainfall from Hurricane Isaac in August 2012 prompted the evacuation of 60,000 people downstream of the dam due to high reservoir levels and concerns of its stability. The lake was drained later in the month with plans to rebuild the dam.
