= Antoinette Harrell =

American historian, genealogist, and civil rights activist

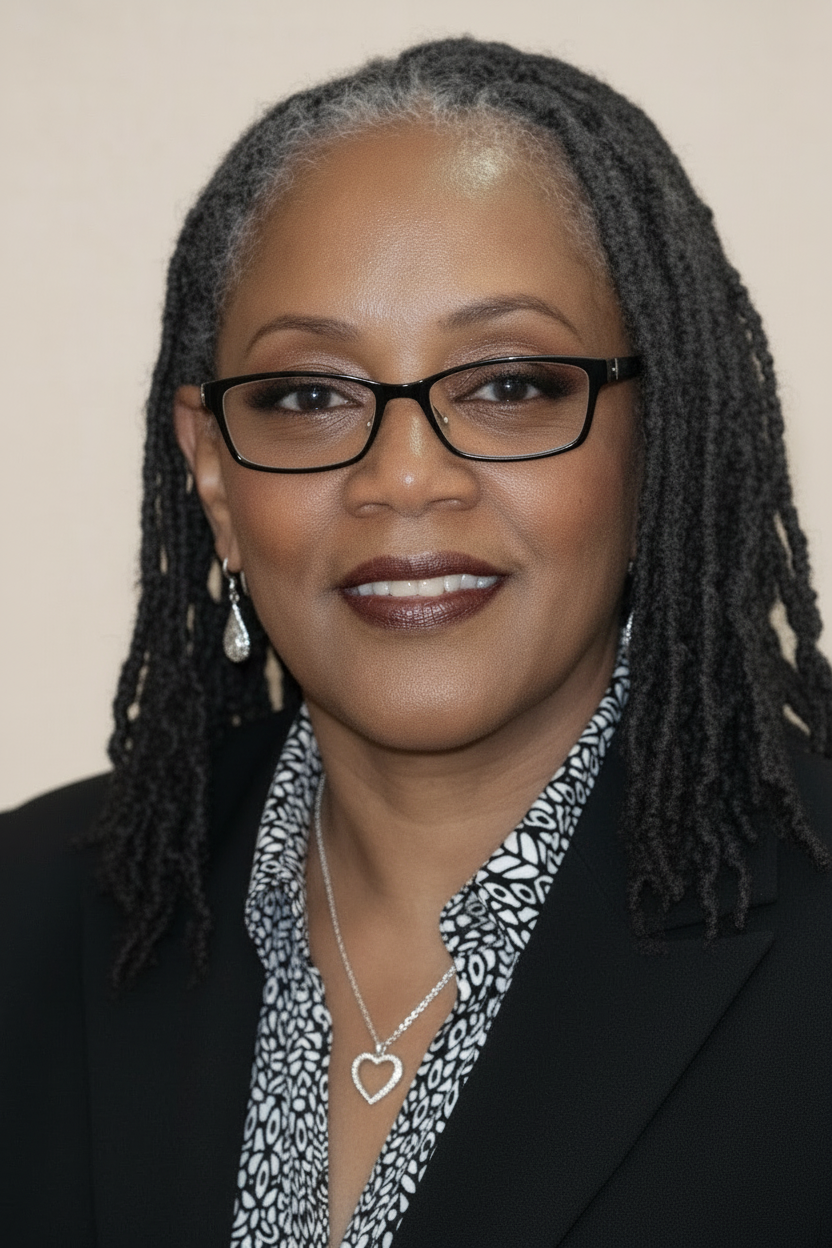
Harrell in 2026

Antoinette Harrell (born c. 1960) is an American historian, genealogist, and civil rights activist. She is known for her research on the post-slavery peonage of African-American sharecroppers in the southern United States.

== Career ==
Much of Harrell's work involves tracing the lineage of African-American families in the southern United States, where they were often subject to local and state laws, known as Black Codes, that made it possible for whites to retain control over them, often in conditions that were reminiscent of those during the existence of chattel slavery. Harrell had been active in local genealogical research in Louisiana since around 1994, when she began researching her own family's history as slaves. She began giving lectures on the subject, and was approached by Mae Miller who stated that she had been enslaved up until recently in Mississippi. Mae Miller's life story came to light when she spoke to Harrell about it; Harrell highlighted it in the short documentary The Untold Story: Slavery in the 20th Century (2009), which Harrell executive produced. According to testimony gathered by Harrell, conditions like this persisted through the 20th century, with some people remaining trapped in debt bondage and sharecropping through the 1970s, a notable instance being a family held on a modern-day plantation in Killona, Louisiana. As a family historian, Harrell conducts this research by interviewing living descendants and families of people who were subjected to these 20th-century debt bondage systems, as well as by reviewing deeds, census information, and records from local archives and libraries and even those from the National Archives in Washington, D.C.

Harrell has been involved in lawsuits pertaining to the history of slavery and forced debt bondage of African Americans, including a class action suit brought by Deadria Farmer-Paellmann and the Restitution Study Group against corporations that were known to have historically financed or otherwise benefited from slavery, including Aetna Insurance, CSX Railroad, and Lloyd's of London. Most of the defendant corporations were involved in the insurance or transportation industries, and were alleged to be liable for having insured, transported, or owned slaves.

Her extensive research on African-American leaders and churches in Tangipahoa Parish, Louisiana has led to four National Historical Markers being erected in the parish: at Greater St. James AME Church in Hammond, La. founded by the Rev. Charles Daggs; at the gravesite of Ponchatoula's first Black Mayor Arthur Tasker; at Grant Chapel African Methodist Episcopal Church in Amite, and at Mt. Canaan Missionary Baptist Church of Arcola organized by the Reverend M. Allen.

Materials collected by Harrell, including photographs and recorded oral histories, are kept in seven African-American collections at the Center for Southeast Louisiana Studies at Southeastern Louisiana University. These collections document the history, genealogy, and cultural heritage of the Harrell Family, Richardson Funeral Home Collection in Amite, La., the Reverend Arthur Tasker, Robert "Free Bob" Louis Vernon Jr., Bernice Alexander Bennett, Mt. Canaan Missionary Baptist Church of Arcola, and Eddie and Carrie Ponds. Her research is also archived at the Amistad Research Center at Tulane University in New Orleans. She has publicized her research through numerous books and feature articles in Louisiana media including The Drum, Jozef Syndicate La, and 64 Parishes magazine as well as a local access television show called Knowing Your Family History, a weekly video discussion called Nurturing Our Roots, and has hosted Youth Genealogy Camps, where students are able to trace family histories through the same methods that she uses in her research.

In 2017, she earned honorary doctor of divinity from The People's Bible Training Institute in Florida for her national and international activism and community services.

== Bibliography ==
- Harrell, Antionette (2000). You are My Shadow: The Harrell's Genealogy and Historical Identity. Sunrise Press. ISBN 978-0967727905.
- Harrell, Antionette (2010). Nurturing My Family Tree: Genealogy for Children. AuthorHouse. ISBN 978-1468580600.
- Harrell, Antionette (2014). Department of Justice: Slavery, Peonage, and Involuntary Servitude. Antoinette Harrell. ISBN 978-0967727998.
- Harrell, Antoinette; Smith, Leonard (2019). Images of America: African Americans in Tangipahoa and St. Helena Parishes. Arcadia Publishing. ISBN 978-1467102643.
