= Robert, Louisiana =

Unincorporated community in Louisiana

- Unincorporated community
- Location within Louisiana Location within the United States
- Coordinates: 30°30′23″N 90°20′27″W
- Country: United States
- State: Louisiana
- Parish: Tangipahoa
- Elevation: 8 ft (2.4 m)
- Time zone: UTC-6 (Central (CST))
  - Summer (DST): UTC-5 (CDT)
- ZIP code: 70455
- Area code: 985
- GNIS feature ID: 538632

Robert is an unincorporated community in Tangipahoa Parish, Louisiana, United States. It lies east of Hammond, at the intersection of US 190 and LA 445, from which it has a signed exit on Interstate 12. Robert is the largest settlement in Tangipahoa Parish's rural 8th ward.

The community, which has 20 streets and one stoplight, was thrust into the international spotlight when the Deepwater Horizon Unified Command was established at the Shell Robert Training and Conference Center to coordinate response to the Deepwater Horizon oil spill in 2010.

== Notable employers ==
Robert is home to diverse employers:

- Regina Coeli Child Development Center oversees Head Start programs in six of Louisiana's civil parishes.
- Walmart has a large distribution center east of Robert on the road (US 190) to Goodbee, Louisiana.
- Yogi Bear Jellystone Park is a resort encampment near the Robert (LA 445) interchange on Interstate 12.
- Florida Parishes Juvenile Detention Center, a rehabilitation institution for wayward youths, is physically located within Tangipahoa Parish along its boundary with Saint Tammany Parish east of Robert.
- Louisiana Renaissance Festival attracts thousands of tourists who pass through Robert annually in November en route to the festival grounds on LA 1064 (Tangipahoa River Road).
- Louisiana State University's Agricultural Experiment Station occupies 140 acres (0.57 km^{2}) along LA 1067 (Old Covington Highway) near the west bank of the Tangipahoa River across from Robert.

== Political demographics ==
In elections during the 2000s (decade), Robert demonstrated an unusually homogeneous voting behavior. In the 2008 Democratic presidential primary, Barack Obama’s Louisiana vote was 57.40 percent; in Tangipahoa Parish, Obama won a plurality of 39.81 percent; but in Robert (Tangipahoa Parish Precinct 122) Hillary Clinton beat Obama 45 to 9 (a 5:1 ratio) among 64 votes cast. With comparable pluralities Mike Huckabee carried the state and the parish over John McCain on the Republican side; but, in Robert, Huckabee won with a 59.96 percent majority (among 79 votes cast).

In the 2008 presidential election, McCain and running-mate Sarah Palin carried Louisiana and Tangipahoa Parish by comparable majorities but trounced Obama and Joe Biden in Robert with 87.54 percent.

== Bombing range ==
During World War II a 15,216-acre (61.58 km^{2}) tract northeast of Robert served as the Hammond Bombing and Gunnery Range. As late as 2009 the 300 property owners in the tract were still under legal obligation to disclose the potential for unexploded ordnance. "[R]esidents cannot do as they wish with their properties . . . [but] have a moral obligation to reveal that it was a bombing range during a sale" according to Bruce Harrell CPA.
