= 2nd Alabama Cavalry Regiment =

Cavalry regiment of the Confederate States Army

- Active: 1862–1865
- Disbanded: May 5, 1865
- Country: Confederate States
- Allegiance: Alabama
- Branch: Army
- Type: Cavalry
- Size: Regiment
- Part of: Ferguson's Brigade
- Facings: Yellow
- Battles: American Civil War; Battle of Okolona; Battle of Rocky Face Ridge; Battle of New Hope Church; Battle of Marietta; Battle of Peachtree Creek; Battle of Atlanta; Battle of Jonesborough; Battle of Lovejoy's Station; Battle of Ladiga; Siege of Savannah; Carolinas Campaign

Commanders
- Commanding officers: Col. F. Winston Hunter (1862–63); Col. Richard G. Earle (1863–64); Lieut. Col. John N. Carpenter (acting) (1864–65)

The 2nd Alabama Cavalry Regiment was a cavalry formation of the Confederate States Army in the Western Theater of the American Civil War. It was commanded by Colonel F. Winston Hunter from its organization in 1862 until 1863 when he was court-martialed and dismissed from the service, Colonel Richard G. Earle from 1863 until 1864 when he was killed in the Atlanta Campaign, and Lieutenant Colonel John N. Carpenter until the regiment disbanded in May 1865.

== History ==
The 2nd Alabama Cavalry Regiment was organized and mustered into Confederate service on May 1, 1862, at Montgomery, Alabama. The regiment operated for a time in Florida, then skirmished in North Mississippi under Brigadier-General Daniel Ruggles before being assigned to Ferguson's Brigade. Under this command it was active in the Atlanta Campaign, Battle of Ladiga, Siege of Savannah, and Carolinas Campaign. Later the regiment formed part of President Jefferson Davis' escort when he moved southward during the last days of the war. It surrendered at Forsyth, Georgia, in May 1865 with about 450 officers and cavalrymen.

== Regimental order of battle ==
Units of regiment included:

- Company A
- Company B
- Company C
- Company D
- Company E
- Company F
- Company G
- Company H (Shorter Dragoons)
- Company I
- Company K (Dillehay Dragoons)

== See also ==
- List of Confederate units from Alabama
