= 11th (Perrin's) Mississippi Cavalry Regiment =

Cavalry regiment of the Confederate States Army

11th Mississippi Cavalry Regiment
- Active: 1863–1865
- Disbanded: May 5, 1865
- Country: Confederate States
- Allegiance: Mississippi
- Branch: Army
- Type: Cavalry
- Size: Regiment
- Part of: Ferguson's Brigade
- Nickname: "Perrin's regiment"
- Facings: Yellow
- Battles: American Civil War; Battle of Rocky Face Ridge; Battle of New Hope Church; Battle of Marietta; Battle of Peachtree Creek; Battle of Atlanta; Battle of Jonesborough; Battle of Lovejoy's Station; Battle of Ladiga; Siege of Savannah; Carolinas Campaign

Commanders
- Commanding officers: Col. Robert O. Perrin (1863–65); Lieut. Col. Henry L. Muldrow (acting) (1865)

The 11th Mississippi Cavalry Regiment, also known as Perrin's Mississippi Cavalry Regiment, was a cavalry formation of the Confederate States Army in the Western Theater of the American Civil War commanded by Colonel Robert O. Perrin from 1863 to March 1865, when he resigned, and Lieutenant Colonel Henry L. Muldrow until disbanded in May 1865.

== History ==
The regiment was organized and mustered into Confederate service on October 6, 1863, in North and Middle Mississippi from new and existing companies of mounted men as Perrin's Mississippi Cavalry Battalion, Mississippi State Troops. It was expanded, reorganized, and redesignated Perrin's Mississippi Cavalry Regiment on December 23, 1863. It took part in the battles of Rocky Face Ridge, Peachtree Creek, Atlanta, and Ladiga. It was redesignated the 11th Mississippi Cavalry Regiment on March 20, 1865, and disbanded on May 5, 1865.

== Regimental order of battle ==
Units of Perrin's regiment included:

- Company A
- Company B
- Company C
- Company D
- Company E
- Company F
- Company G
- Company H (Chickasaw Rangers)
- Company I (Barksdale Avengers)
- Company K

== See also ==
- List of Confederate units from Mississippi

== Bibliography ==
- Campbell, W. A. (December 1920). Cunningham, S. A. (ed.). "Humors of the March". Confederate Veteran. Vol. I, no. 7. Nashville, Tenn.: S. A. Cunningham. p. 216. OCLC 1564663 – via Internet Archive.
- Douglas, G. M. (December 1920). Cunningham, S. A. (ed.). "A Skirmish at Lost Mountain". Confederate Veteran. Vol. XXVIII, no. 12. Nashville, Tenn.: S. A. Cunningham. p. 452. OCLC 1564663 – via Internet Archive.
- Lee, Stephen D. (1909). Riley, Franklin L. (ed.). "The War in Mississippi After the Fall of Vicksburg, July 4, 1863". Publications of the Mississippi Historical Society. Vol. X. Oxford, Mississippi: Mississippi Historical Society. pp. 47–62. ISSN 0885-792X. LCCN 10020861. OL 22890925M – via Internet Archive.
- Roby, William A. (October 1908). Cunningham, S. A. (ed.). "Scouting in Georgia". Confederate Veteran. Vol. XVI, no. 10. Nashville, Tenn.: S. A. Cunningham. pp. 519–520. OCLC 1564663 – via Internet Archive.
