= Thomas C. Catchings =

American politician (1847–1927)

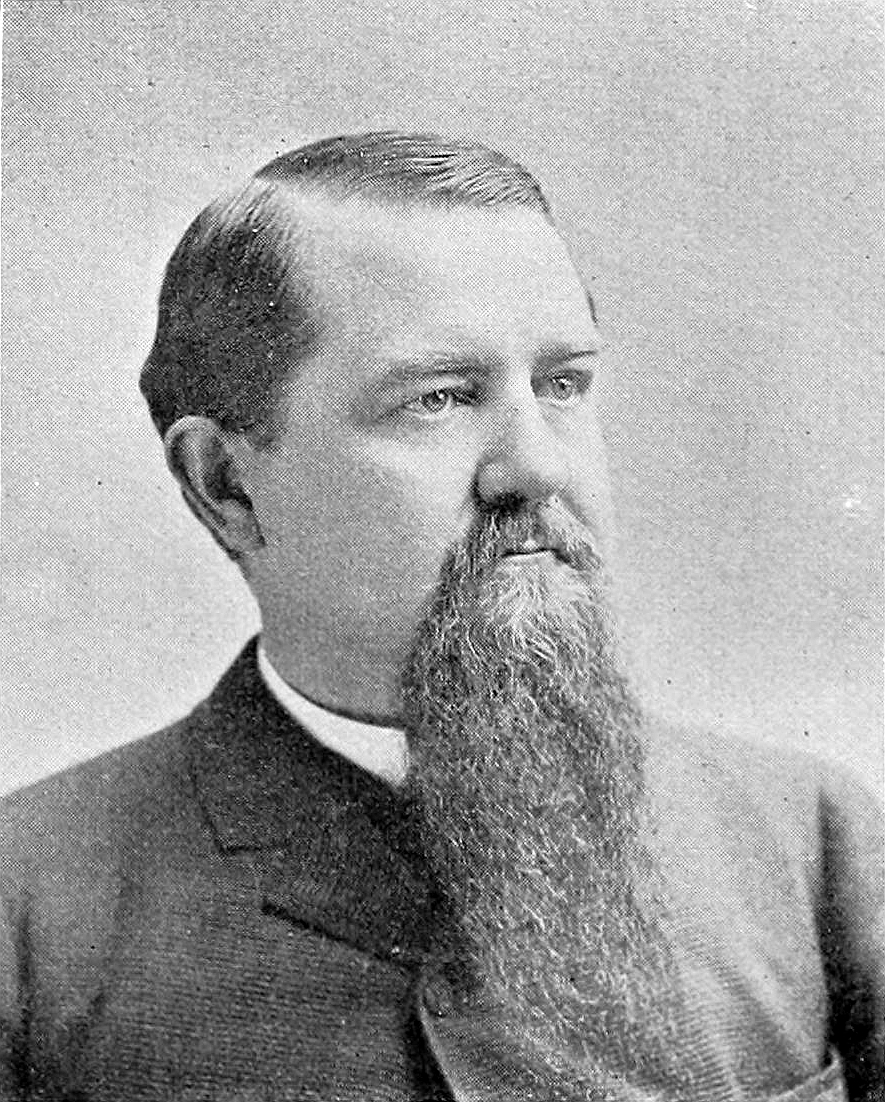
- Official portrait, 1893

Member of the U.S. House of Representatives from Mississippi's 3rd district
- In office March 4, 1885 – March 3, 1901
- Preceded by: Elza Jeffords
- Succeeded by: Patrick S. Henry

17th Attorney General of Mississippi
- In office 1878–1885
- Governor: John M. Stone; Robert Lowry
- Preceded by: George E. Harris
- Succeeded by: Thomas S. Ford

Mississippi State Senate
- In office 1875–1877

Personal details
- Born: Thomas Clendinen Catchings; January 11, 1847 Brownsville, Mississippi, US
- Died: December 24, 1927 (aged 80) Vicksburg, Mississippi, US
- Resting place: Cedar Hill Cemetery; Vicksburg, Mississippi
- Party: Democratic
- Spouse: Florence Shearer
- Education: University of Mississippi
- Occupation: Politician; lawyer

Military service
- Allegiance: Confederate States
- Branch: Confederate States Army
- Years of service: 1861–1865
- Rank: Private
- Unit: Company K, 18th Mississippi Infantry Regiment; Company C, 11th Mississippi Cavalry Regiment
- Battles: American Civil War; Battle of Peachtree Creek; Battle of Atlanta; Battle of Ladiga; Siege of Savannah; Carolinas Campaign

Thomas Clendinen Catchings (January 11, 1847 – December 24, 1927) was an American lawyer who served eight terms as a U.S. representative from Mississippi from 1885 to 1901.

== Early life and education ==
Thomas Clendenin Catchings was born January 11, 1847, at "Fleetwood" in Hinds County, Mississippi, to Dr. T. J. and Nancy M. (née Clendenin) Catchings. Tutored at home until September 1860, he entered the State University at Oxford where he was a member of St. Anthony Hall. In 1861 he entered Oakland College near Rodney. He entered the Confederate States Army in 1861 and served as a private in Company K, 18th Mississippi Infantry Regiment, and subsequently in Company C, 11th Mississippi Cavalry Regiment.

== Political career ==
He was admitted to the bar in 1866 and commenced practice in Vicksburg. Catchings was elected to the State Senate in 1875 but resigned in 1877. Catchings was elected attorney general in 1877. He was reelected in 1881 and served until February 16, 1885.

Catchings, a Democrat, was elected to the 49th and to the seven succeeding Congresses (March 4, 1885–March 3, 1901) after winning a disputed election against Cornelius Jones, an African American lawyer and state legislator. Catchings served as chairman of the Committee on Levees and Improvements of the Mississippi River (50th Congress), Committee on Railways and Canals (52nd and 53rd Congress), Committee on Rivers and Harbors (53rd Congress). He first introduced a bill for Vicksburg National Military Park in January 1896. When it failed to pass, although favorably reported by committee, he re-introduced it in the next Congress in December 1897.

== Later life ==
Later, Catchings was employed as division counsel for the Southern Railway. Appointed by Governor Vardaman, he also served as a member of the Mississippi Code Commission.

== Death and burial ==
He died in Vicksburg on December 24, 1927, and was interred in Cedar Hill Cemetery.

Legal offices
Preceded by George E. Harris	Attorney General of Mississippi; 1878–1885	Succeeded by Thomas S. Ford
U.S. House of Representatives
Preceded by Elza Jeffords	Member of the U.S. House of Representatives from Mississippi's 3rd congressional district 1885-1901	Succeeded by Patrick S. Henry
