= Percy family (United States) =

American family

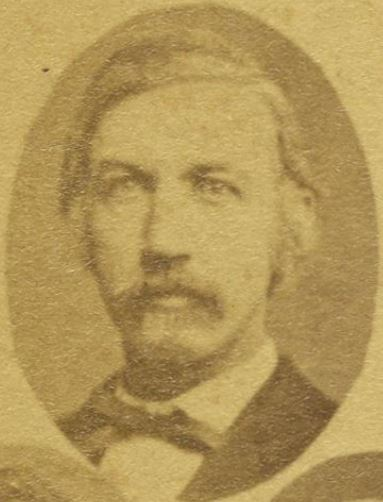
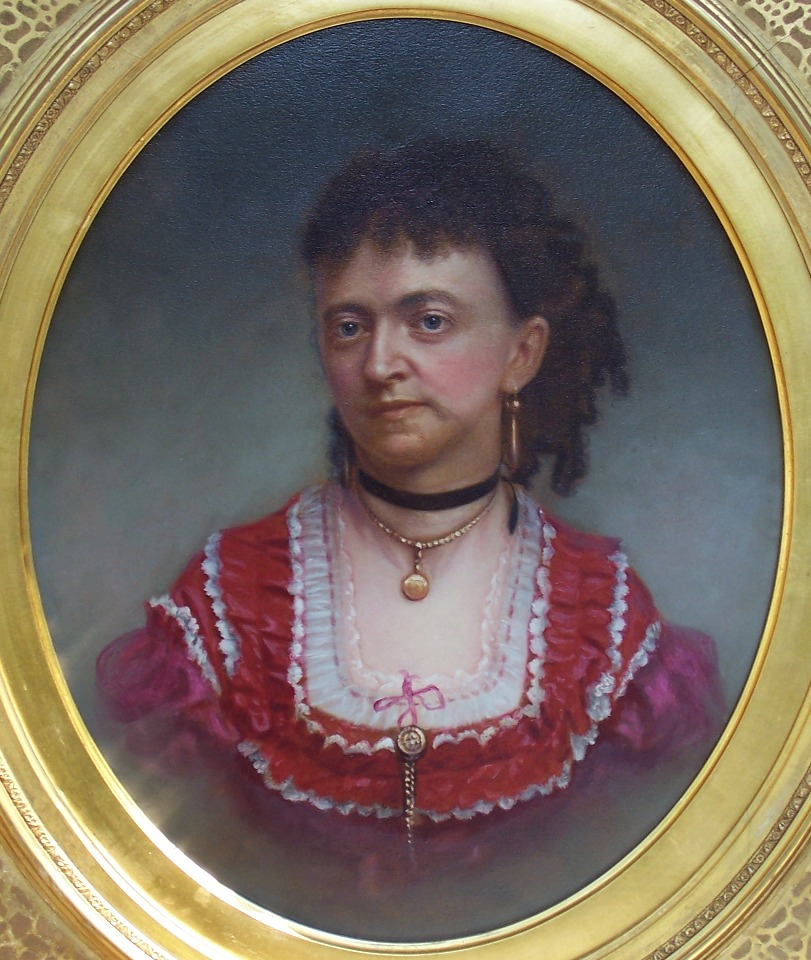
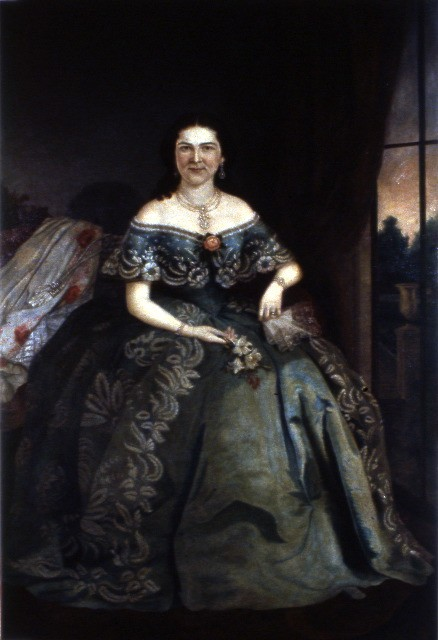
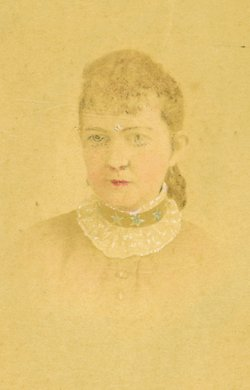
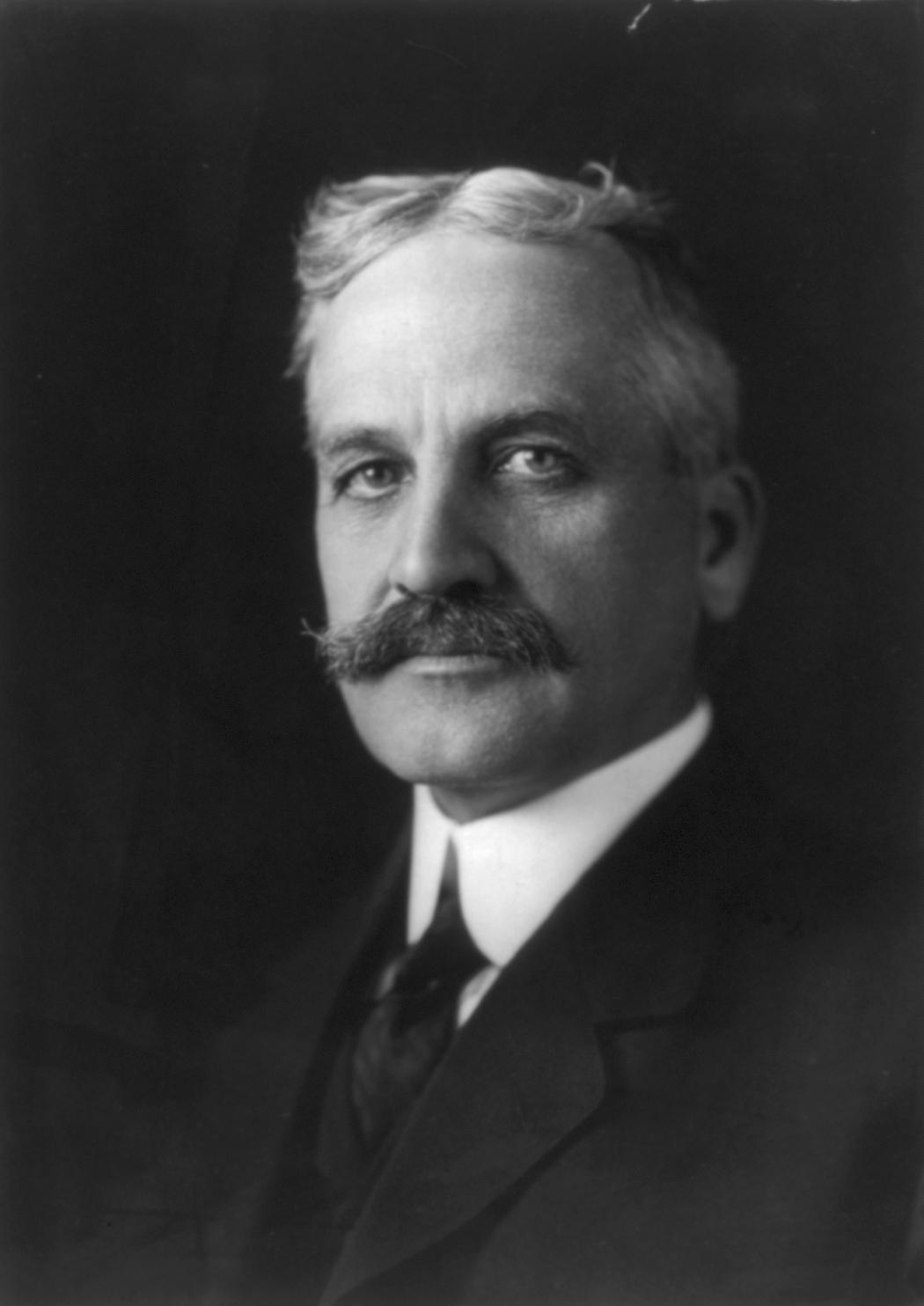
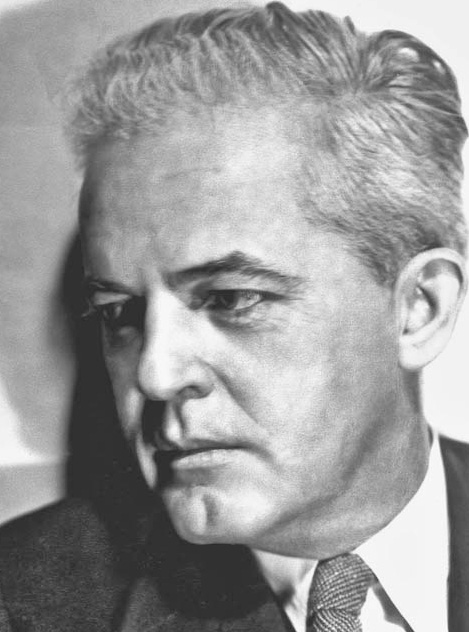
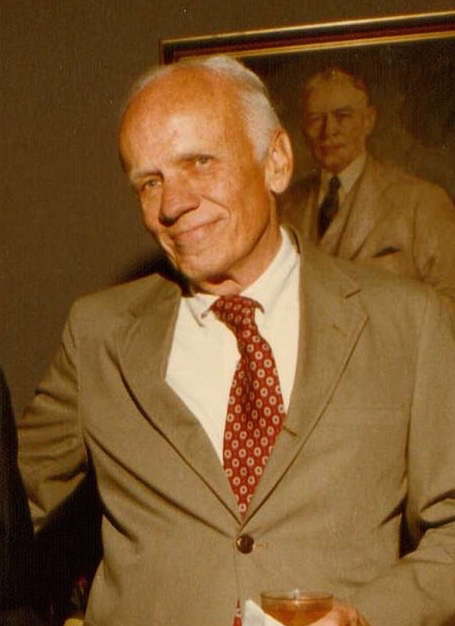
- William Alexander Percy Sarah Dorsey Catherine Anne Warfield Kate Lee Ferguson LeRoy Percy William Alexander Percy Walker Percy
- Country: United States
- Current region: American South
- Origin: England

The Percys are an American family rooted in the American South. Established in Mississippi in the 18th century, the family is best known for their contributions to the Southern American literary arts, their ownership of slave plantations and their struggle with melancholy and suicide across generations.

The first member of the family to arrive in the United States was Charles Percy, who migrated from England to Mississippi in 1776 and became the owner of a slave plantation. There he had a number of children, including Thomas George Percy. Among Charles' grandchildren was gothic novelist Catherine Anne Warfield. His grandson William Alexander Percy became a Confederate colonel during the Civil War and was later elected as a Democratic representative at the Mississippi House of Representatives, where he became speaker. LeRoy Percy, a family member known for his opposition to the Ku Klux Klan, became a United States senator in 1910.

LeRoy's son, novelist and secret homosexual William Alexander Percy, wrote the Southern classic Lanterns on the Levee (1941). William later adopted his relative Walker Percy, who became one of the best-known novelists of the family. Several members of the family have expressed signs of melancholy and depression. Beginning with Charles' self-inflicted death in 1794, at least one member of each generation died by suicide until 1929.

Other members of the family include University of Massachusetts history professor William Armstrong Percy III, writer Eleanor Percy Lee and her novelist daughter Kate Lee Ferguson, and novelist Sarah Dorsey, daughter of Thomas.
