= Eliza A. Dupuy =

American novelist

- Born: Eliza Ann Dupuy c. 1814; Petersburg, Virginia, U.S.
- Died: December 29, 1880; New Orleans, Louisiana, U.S.
- Occupations: literateur; author
- Writing career
- Language: English
- Genres: Gothic thrillers; novels; short stories

Eliza Ann Dupuy (c. 1814 – December 29, 1880) was a littérateur and pioneer author of the Southern United States. She is remembered as the first woman of Mississippi to earn her living as a writer.

Dupuy wrote approximately 25 Gothic thrillers during the period of 1845 through 1880, as well as domestic novels, and short stories, making her perhaps one of the most widely-known authors of her day. At an early age, she became a governess in Natchez, Mississippi and while so employed wrote her first book, The Conspirators, in which Aaron Burr is the principal character. Her other works included The Huguenot Exiles, Emma Wattou, or Trials and Triumphs, Celeste, Florence, or the Fatal Vow, Separation, Concealed Treasure, Ashleigh, and The Country Neighborhood. She wrote in all about forty stories, most of them for the New York Ledger. In later life, she experienced a weakness of the eyes.

== Early life and education ==
Eliza Ann Dupuy was born in Petersburg, Virginia, 1814. Her father was Jess Dupuy, who owned a ship and was engaged in the shipping industry. Her mother was Mary Anne Thompson Sturdevant. Dupuy had eight older siblings.

She was the descendant of that Colonel Dupuy who led the band of Huguenot exiles to the banks of James river. Colonel Dupuy's grave is still exhibited in the old church at Jamestown. Her maternal grandfather was Captain Joel Sturdevant, who raised a company at his own expense, and fought gallantly throughout the American Revolutionary War. Dupuy is also related by blood to the Watkins family of Virginia. She is thus by birth related to the oldest families in the "Old Dominion"—a fact she never forgot. One of her best novels is founded on the story of The Huguenot Exiles; many of the incidents therein are drawn from family tradition.

At an early age, the family removed to Norfolk, Virginia, and then to Portsmouth, Ohio, Flemingsburg, Kentucky, and finally, Augusta, Kentucky. While in Kentucky, Dupuy augmented her education with self study in preparation to become a teacher. During this time, she wrote Merton: A Tale of the Revolution (no copy survives), to help out with her family's financial poor affairs.

== Career ==
After the death of her father, her family experienced heavy reverses of fortune, and Dupuy aided in the support of her younger brother and sister. She was competent to teach. She became a governess in the family of Mr. Thomas G. Ellis, of Natchez, Mississippi where she had charge of the education of his daughter, Sarah Ellis Dorsey ("Filia") who became an author. Dupuy found a pleasant home here, where she was thrown continually into the society of such women as Eleanor and Catherine Ware, and such men as Seargent Smith Prentiss, John Ross, Boyd, and Bingaman. Natchez at that time boasted a brilliant intellectual circle, and the young governess, with her dignified reserve, was well received.

Dupuy began to write very early. While at Natchez she wrote the Conspirator, and read it aloud to her circle of friends and admirers. Eleanor Ware and she used to have literary symposiums, where they would read their productions to each other and to gentle Mrs. Ellis, who sympathized warmly in their tastes, and little "Filia" would often hide in a corner to listen. Dupuy was badly treated about one of her novels, which she loaned to Prof. Joseph Holt Ingraham, who was then a "wild and unprincipled man". He afterward wrote The Prince of the House of David; but at this time, he was both reckless and gifted. He took Dupuy's manuscript and never returned it to her; afterward he worked it up into a book, which he called Lafitte, the Pirate of the Gulf. With some difficulty, Dupuy succeeded in getting her Conspirator published. It is a story of the conspiracy of Aaron Burr. It was very successful—more than 25,000 copies of this novel were sold.

She now devoted much of her time to writing, and gradually was enabled to give up the confinement of a teacher's life. She taught after this in a "country neighborhood", near Natchez, where she wrote her novel of that name. She wrote constantly ever since. She was unfortunate in the failure of her publisher and the consequent loss of her copyrights, which would have supplied her with a good income. She was always industrious, working usually about four hours every morning, and her manuscripts were only corrected when sent to the printer.

Before the civil war, her work was published in the Southern Literary Messenger and Godey's Lady's Book. After the war, for several years, she was engaged in writing for Robert E. Bonner’s New York Ledger. She was bound by contract to furnish Bonner with a thousand pages annually. She was a littérateur by profession. In consequence, she improved in her writings. Her novel of The Evil Genius, furnished to the Ledger, was regarded by many readers as the best of her numerous writings.

== Personal life ==
Dupuy was the sole support of a brother who was blind from amaurosis, and she herself later experienced a weakness of the eyes.

Dupuy remained unmarried her entire life. In later years, she resided at Flemingsburg, Kentucky. She died in New Orleans, December 29, 1880, and was buried at the Fleming County Cemetery in Flemingsburg.

== Publications ==
=== Novels published in the New York Ledger ===
- The Lost Deeds
- Mysterious Marriage
- White Terror
- Outlaw’s Bride
- Life Curse
- Warning Voice
- Secret Chamber
- Family Secret
- Lady of Ashhurst
- Fatal Error
- Evil Genius
- The Dead Heart

=== Novels published in book form ===
- Merton; a Tale of the Revolution
- The Conspirator
- Emma Walton, or Trials and Triumphs
- The Country Neighborhood
- Celeste, or The Pirate’s Daughter
- The Separation
- The Divorce
- The Coquette’s Punishment
- Florence, or The Fatal Vow
- The Concealed Treasure
- Ashleigh
- The Planter’s Daughter
- The Huguenot Exiles
