= Katherine Lee =

Katherine or Catherine Lee may refer to:

- Catherine Lee, founder of Discovery Girls magazine
- Catherine Lee (children's writer) (1847–1914)
- Catherine Lee (politician) (born 1960), Taiwanese politician
- Catherine Lee (painter) (born 1950)
- Catherine Lee Ferguson or Kate Lee Ferguson (1841–1928), American novelist
- Katherine Lee or Deltalina, flight attendant and presenter for Delta Air Lines campaign
- Katherine Lee (actress) (1909–1968), American child actress
- Katherine Lee (bowler), participated in Bowling at the 1987 Southeast Asian Games
- Katherine M. Lee (schooner)

== See also ==
- Kate Lee (disambiguation)
- Kathy Lee (disambiguation)
