= 2nd Cavalry =

2nd Cavalry, 2nd Cavalry Division, 2nd Cavalry Brigade or 2nd Cavalry Regiment may refer to:

== Armies ==
- 2nd Cavalry Army, of the Bolshevik Red Army in the Russian Civil War

== Corps ==
- II Cavalry Corps (German Empire), German formation of the First World War
- II Cavalry Corps (Grande Armée), French formation of Napoleonic Wars
- II Cavalry Corps, intended name for the Desert Mounted Corps British formation of the First World War
- 2nd Cavalry Corps (Russian Empire)
- 2nd Cavalry Corps (Soviet Union)

== Divisions ==
- 2nd Cavalry Division (Australia)
- 2nd Cavalry Division (Belgium)
- 2nd Light Cavalry Division (France)
- 2nd Cavalry Division (German Empire)
- 2nd Cavalry Division (Reichswehr)
- 2nd Indian Cavalry Division
- 2nd Cavalry Division Emanuele Filiberto Testa di Ferro, of the Italian Army
- 2nd Guard Cavalry division (Russian Empire)
- 2nd Cavalry Division (United Kingdom)
- 2nd Cavalry Division (United States)

== Brigades ==
- 2nd Cavalry Brigade (Australia)
- 2nd Cavalry Brigade (Hungary)
- 2nd (Sialkot) Cavalry Brigade, of the Indian Army
- 2nd Cavalry Brigade (Poland)
- 2nd Cavalry Brigade (United Kingdom)
- 2nd Brigade Combat Team, 1st Cavalry Division (United States)

== Regiments ==
- 2nd Cavalry Regiment (Australia)
- 2nd Regiment of Cavalry (Canada)
- 2nd Foreign Cavalry Regiment, of the French Foreign Legion
- 2nd Cavalry Regiment (Greece)
- 2nd Madras Cavalry, of the East India Company
- 2nd Cavalry Regiment (Portugal)
- 2nd Cavalry Regiment (United States)
- 2nd Regiment Alabama Volunteer Cavalry (Confederate), a Confederate regiment of the American Civil War
- 2nd Arkansas Cavalry Regiment (Slemons'), a Confederate regiment of the American Civil War
- 2nd Arkansas Cavalry Regiment (Union), a Union regiment of the American Civil War
- 2nd California Cavalry Regiment, a Union regiment of the American Civil War
- 2nd Colorado Cavalry Regiment, a Union regiment of the American Civil War
- 2nd Florida Cavalry Regiment (Union), a Union regiment of the American Civil War
- 2nd Regiment Indiana Cavalry, a Union regiment of the American Civil War
- 2nd Regiment Illinois Volunteer Cavalry, a Union regiment of the American Civil War
- 2nd Regiment Iowa Volunteer Cavalry, a Union regiment of the American Civil War
- 2nd Regiment Kansas Volunteer Cavalry, a Union regiment of the American Civil War
- 2nd Maryland Cavalry (Confederate), a Confederate regiment of the American Civil War
- 2nd Regiment of Cavalry, Massachusetts Volunteers, a Union regiment of the American Civil War
- 2nd Michigan Volunteer Cavalry Regiment, a Union regiment of the American Civil War
- 2nd Minnesota Volunteer Cavalry Regiment, a Union regiment of the American Civil War
- 2nd Mississippi Cavalry Regiment, a Confederate regiment of the American Civil War
- 2nd Nebraska Cavalry, a Union regiment of the American Civil War
- 2nd Ohio Cavalry, a Union regiment of the American Civil War
- 2nd Tennessee Cavalry Regiment, a Confederate regiment of the American Civil War
- 2nd United States Colored Cavalry Regiment, a Union regiment of the American Civil War
- 2nd Virginia Cavalry, a Confederate regiment of the American Civil War
- 2nd West Virginia Volunteer Cavalry Regiment, a Union regiment of the American Civil War
- 2nd Regiment Wisconsin Volunteer Cavalry, a Union regiment of the American Civil War

== Battalions ==
- 2nd Cavalry Battalion (Mississippi Reserves), Confederate Army
- 2nd Maryland Cavalry Battalion, Confederate Army
- 2nd Battalion Massachusetts Cavalry, Union Army
