= Henry L. Muldrow =

American politician (1837-1905)

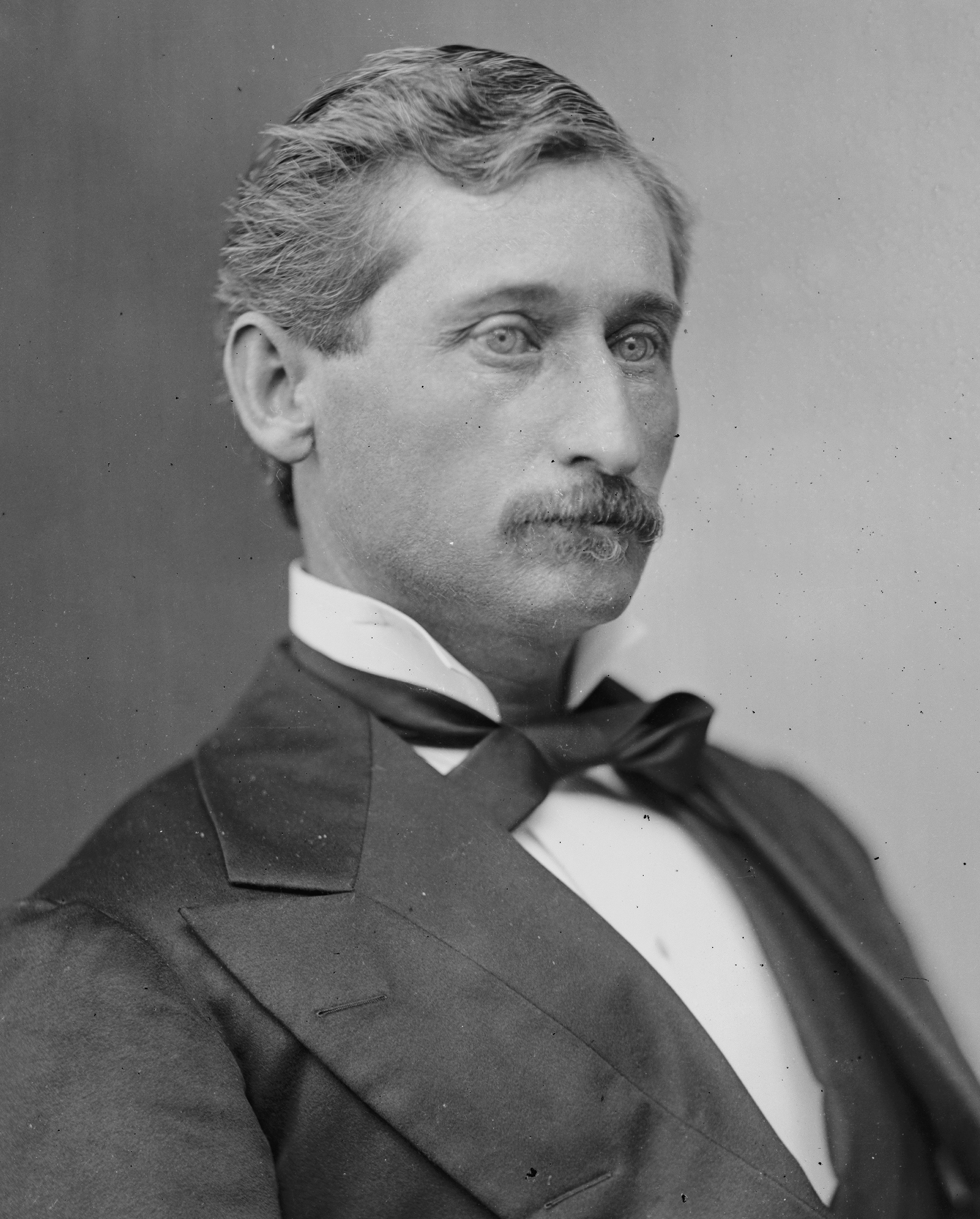

First Assistant United States Secretary of the Interior
- In office July 1, 1885 – April 1, 1889
- President: Grover Cleveland

Member of the U.S. House of Representatives from Mississippi's 1st district
- In office March 4, 1877 – March 3, 1885
- Preceded by: Lucius Q. C. Lamar
- Succeeded by: John M. Allen

Member of the Mississippi House of Representatives
- In office 1875

Personal details
- Born: Henry Lowndes Muldrow; February 8, 1837 Lowndes County, Mississippi, U.S.
- Died: March 1, 1905 (aged 68) Oktibbeha County, Mississippi, U.S.
- Cause of death: Heart failure
- Resting place: Odd Fellows Cemetery, Starkville, Mississippi, U.S. 33°27′45.0″N 88°48′24.3″W
- Party: Democratic
- Spouse: Eliza Dick Ervin (m. 1860)
- Education: University of Mississippi (BA, LLB)

Military service
- Allegiance: Confederate States
- Branch: Army
- Years of service: 1861–1865
- Rank: Lieutenant-Colonel
- Commands: 11th Mississippi Cavalry Regiment (acting) (1865)
- Battles: American Civil War; Battle of Fort Donelson (POW); Meridian Campaign (WIA); Battle of Peachtree Creek; Battle of Atlanta; Battle of Ladiga; Siege of Savannah; Campaign of the Carolinas (WIA)

Henry Lowndes Muldrow (February 8, 1837 – March 1, 1905) was an American politician who served as the First Assistant Secretary of the Interior in the first Cleveland administration. Prior to this he served as U.S. Representative from Mississippi's 1st congressional district, a member of the Mississippi House of Representatives and as an officer of the Confederate States Army who commanded a cavalry regiment in the Western Theater of the American Civil War. He was "Grand Cyclops" of the Oktibbeha County Ku Klux Klan den.

== Early life and education ==
Muldrow was born in Lowndes County, Mississippi, on February 8, 1837, the sixth child of Simon Connell (1809–1868) and Louisa Adaline (née Cannon; 1798–1853) Muldrow. He graduated from the University of Mississippi in 1858. The next year he graduated from the law school of the same university; being admitted to the bar and commenced practice in Starkville in the year after. He was appointed second lieutenant in Company C, 14th Mississippi Infantry Regiment in 1861; later attaining the rank of lieutenant-colonel in the 11th Mississippi Cavalry Regiment. Afterwards he served as the attorney for the sixth judicial district of Mississippi and became a member of the Mississippi House of Representatives in 1875. While serving as the attorney for the sixth district, he was a member of the Oktibbeha County Ku Klux Klan den, serving as its "Grand Cyclops". As author Michael Newton points out, "Three dens terrorized Oktibbeha County, led (and defended in court when need be) by Henry Muldrow". Oktibbeha County voters sent Ku Klux leader Henry Muldrow to the state legislature "as a check upon the ignorant negroes in that body". Muldrow won his seat, in part thanks to the intimidation of black voters via threats of violence. Muldrow is also noted, among others, for his public oratory which "persuaded most white Democrats that Klansmen were their champions in a life-or-death struggle to preserve southern society". From 1876 to 1898 he was a trustee of his alma mater.

== Political career ==
Muldrow was elected as a Democrat to the Forty-fifth and to the three succeeding Congresses (March 4, 1877 – March 3, 1885). He also served as chairman, Committee on Territories (Forty-sixth Congress), and on the Committee on Private Land Claims (Forty-eighth Congress). He also helped to introduce a bill that proposed that the U.S. change to use a modified version of the metric system for coinage. During the first administration of President Grover Cleveland he was appointed to the office of First Assistant Secretary of the Interior. He resigned in 1889 and resumed his law practice. Muldrow was also a delegate to the Mississippi Constitutional Convention of 1890. As Newton points out, "The convention's final product, imposed on Mississippi without a popular vote, established a two-dollar poll tax, mandated two years' residency in the state and one year in the would-be voter's district, and denied ballots to convicted felons or tax-defaulters. Section 244 further required that any voter must "be able to read any section of the constitution of this State; or he shall be able to understand the same when read to him, or give a reasonable interpretation thereof." The net effect, by 1892, was to remove 138,400 blacks and 52,000 whites from the state's electoral rolls." The official constitutional record of the 1890 convention reads that "It is the manifest intention of this Convention to secure to the State of Mississippi 'white supremacy". Muldrow was appointed chancellor of the first district of Mississippi in September 1899; serving until 1905. He died on March 1, 1905 of heart and organ failure.

== Honors ==
Muldrow, Oklahoma, and Colonel Muldrow Avenue in Starkville, Mississippi are named after him.

== See also ==
- List of Delta Tau Delta members
- List of people from Mississippi
- List of United States representatives from Mississippi
- List of University of Mississippi alumni

Military offices
Preceded by Colonel Robert O. Perrin	Commanding Officer of the 11th Mississippi Cavalry Regiment; Acting; 1865	Regiment disbanded
U.S. House of Representatives
Preceded by Lucius Q. C. Lamar	Member of the U.S. House of Representatives from Mississippi's 1st congressional district 1877–1885	Succeeded by John M. Allen
Political offices
New office	First Assistant United States Secretary of the Interior; 1885–1889	Unknown
