= Kate Lee =

Kate or Katie Lee may refer to:

- Kate Lee (English singer) (1858–1904)
- Kate Lee Ferguson (1841–1928), American novelist, poet, and composer
- Kate Lee O'Connor (born 1992), American singer, songwriter, fiddler
- Katie Lee (chef) (born 1981), food critic, chef, and former wife of Billy Joel
- Katie Lee (horse), New Zealand Thoroughbred racehorse
- Katie Lee (lyricist)
- Katie Lee (singer) (1919–2017), American folksinger, actress and writer
- Katie Madonna Lee, American screenwriter and filmmaker

== See also ==
- Katie Lea or Katarina Waters (born 1980), German-born English professional wrestler
- Kate Leigh (1881–1964), Australian criminal
- Katie Leigh (born 1958), American voice actress
- Kathy Lee (disambiguation)
- Katherine Lee (disambiguation)
