= Bertram Wyatt-Brown =

American historian of the South (1932–2012)

- Born: March 19, 1932; Harrisburg, Pennsylvania, U.S.
- Died: November 5, 2012 (aged 80); Baltimore, Maryland, U.S.
- Education: Sewanee: The University of the South; King's College, Cambridge
- Occupation: Historian

Bertram Wyatt-Brown (March 19, 1932 – November 5, 2012) was a noted historian of the Southern United States. He was the Richard J. Milbauer Professor Emeritus at the University of Florida, where he taught from 1983 to 2004; he also taught at Case Western University for nearly two decades. He studied the role of honor in southern society, in all classes, and wrote a family study of the Percy family, including twentieth-century authors William Alexander Percy and Walker Percy.

== Early life and education ==
Born in Harrisburg, Pennsylvania, Wyatt-Brown was the son of Laura H. and Hunter Wyatt-Brown, an Episcopal priest who became a bishop. Wyatt-Brown was prepared at historic Saint James School in Maryland, then matriculated at the University of the South in Sewanee, Tennessee, earning his B.A. in 1953.

He joined the Armed Services and served from 1953 to 1955, becoming a lieutenant junior grade in the Naval Reserve. After his military service, he received a second B.A. degree from King's College at Cambridge University in 1957. Wyatt-Brown earned his Ph.D. in history at Johns Hopkins University in 1963, having worked under the supervision of C. Vann Woodward, the noted historian of the South.

== Career ==
Wyatt-Brown was the Richard J. Milbauer Professor Emeritus at the University of Florida, where he taught from 1983 to 2004, and Visiting Scholar, Johns Hopkins University. He previously taught at Colorado State University, University of Colorado, and Case Western Reserve University (1966–1983), with special appointments to University of Wisconsin, University of Richmond, and the College of William and Mary.

During his career, Wyatt-Brown wrote ten books, and more than 90 articles, forewords, and essays, and nearly 150 book reviews and essay reviews. He served on the Editorial Advisory Board for Ohio History, the scholarly journal of the Ohio Historical Society, 1978–1986; and was series editor of the Louisiana State Press' Southern Biography Series. He was a past president of the Society for Historians of the Early American Republic (1994), the St. George Tucker Society (1998–99), and the Southern Historical Association (2000–01).

At the time of his death, he was writing Honor and America's Wars: From the Revolution to Iraq. In 1983 Wyatt-Brown was a history finalist for the American Book Award and the Pulitzer Prize for his best-known work, Southern Honor: Ethics and Behavior in the Old South (1982), described as a study of the "meaning and expression of the ancient code of honor as whites -- both slaveholders and non-slaveholders -- applied it to their lives."

== Personal life and death ==
In 1962 he married Anne Jewett Marbury, whom he met at Johns Hopkins. They had two daughters, Laura and Natalie.

Wyatt-Brown died on November 5, 2012.

== Works ==
- Lewis Tappan and the Evangelical War against Slavery, Cleveland: Press of Case Western Reserve University, 1969.
- The American People in the Antebellum South, (editor) West Haven, CT: Pendulum Press, 1973.
- Southern Honor: Ethics and Behavior in the Old South, New York: Oxford U Press, 1982.
- Yankee Saints and Southern Sinners, Baton Rouge: Louisiana State U Press, 1985.
- Honor and Violence in the Old South, New York: Oxford U Press, 1986. An abridged version of the author's Southern Honor.
- The House of Percy: Honor, Melancholy, and Imagination in a Southern Family, New York: Oxford U Press, 1994.
- The Literary Percys: Family History, Gender, and the Southern Imagination, Athens: U of Georgia Press, 1994.
- The Shaping of Southern Culture: Honor, Grace, and War, 1760s-1880s, Chapel Hill: U of North Carolina Press, 2001.
- Hearts of Darkness: Wellsprings of a Southern Literary Tradition, Baton Rouge: Louisiana State U Press, 2003.
- Virginia's Civil War, (editor with Peter Wallenstein) Charlottesville: U of Virginia Press, 2004.
- A Warring Nation: Honor, Race, and Humiliation in America and Abroad, Charlottesville: U of Virginia Press, 2014.
