= Ferguson's Brigade =

Cavalry brigade of the Confederate States Army

- Active: 1863–1865
- Disbanded: May 5, 1865
- Country: Confederate States
- Branch: Army
- Type: Cavalry
- Size: Brigade
- Battles: American Civil War; Battle of Vincent’s Cross Roads; Meridian campaign; Battle of Rocky Face Ridge; Battle of New Hope Church; Battle of Marietta; Battle of Peachtree Creek; Battle of Atlanta; Battle of Lovejoy's Station; Battle of Jonesborough; Battle of Ladiga; Siege of Savannah; Carolinas campaign

Commanders
- Commanding officers: Brig. Gen. Samuel W. Ferguson

The Ferguson's Brigade, also known as Ferguson's Cavalry Brigade, was a cavalry formation of the Confederate States Army in the Western Theater of the American Civil War commanded by Brigadier-General Samuel W. Ferguson until it was disbanded in May 1865.

== History ==
Organized on August 15, 1863, in Okolona, Mississippi, Ferguson's Brigade first saw action on October 26 at the Battle of Vincent’s Cross Roads. On February 13, 1864, it was at Big Mountain confronting Sherman’s Meridian expedition. Throughout the Atlanta campaign the brigade was part of Jackson's Cavalry Division and fought in the battles of Rocky Face Ridge, New Hope Church, Peachtree Creek, Atlanta, Lovejoy's Station, and Jonesborough.

Ferguson's Brigade also participated in the Battle of Ladiga during Hood's ill-fated Tennessee campaign. In November and December it was attached to Iverson’s Division, Wheeler's Cavalry Corps, where the brigade fought during Sherman’s march to Savannah and siege of that city. The brigade participated in the Carolinas campaign and was part of the escort of President Jefferson Davis, the Cabinet, and Treasury until it was disbanded on May 5, 1865, near Washington, Georgia, by order of Secretary of War John C. Breckinridge.
