= 2nd Mounted Brigade =

2nd Mounted Brigade may refer to:

- 2nd (2nd South Midland) Mounted Brigade, designation given to the 2nd South Midland Mounted Brigade while serving with the 2nd Mounted Division in the Gallipoli Campaign
- 2nd Mounted Brigade (United Kingdom), also known as 2/2nd South Western Mounted Brigade

== See also ==
- 2nd Cavalry Brigade (disambiguation)
- 2nd Brigade (disambiguation)
