= Samuel W. Ferguson =

Confederate States Army general (1834–1917)

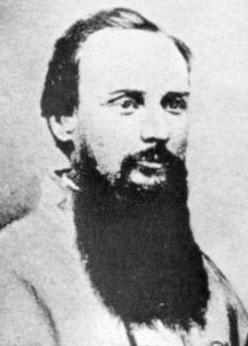
- Ferguson in uniform, c. 1862
- Born: Samuel Wragg Ferguson; November 3, 1834; Charleston, South Carolina, U.S.
- Died: February 3, 1917 (aged 82); Jackson, Mississippi, U.S.
- Burial place: Greenwood Cemetery, Jackson, Mississippi, U.S. 32°18′29.5″N 90°11′02.3″W
- Education: United States Military Academy
- Spouse: Catherine Sarah Lee (m. 1862)
- Children: 4
- Military career
- Allegiance: United States; Confederate States
- Branch: United States Army; Confederate States Army
- Service years: 1857–1861 (U.S.); 1861–1865 (C.S.)
- Rank: Second Lieutenant (U.S.); Brigadier-General (C.S.)
- Commands: 5th South Carolina Cavalry; 28th Mississippi Cavalry; Ferguson's Brigade
- Battles: Utah Expedition; American Civil War; Bombardment of Fort Sumter; First Battle of Manassas; Mississippi River campaigns; Battle of Shiloh; Battle of Farmington; Battle of Vincent’s Cross Roads; Meridian campaign; Battle of Rocky Face Ridge; Battle of Peachtree Creek; Battle of Atlanta; Battle of Lovejoy's Station; Battle of Ladiga; Siege of Savannah; Carolinas campaign

Samuel Wragg Ferguson (November 3, 1834 – February 3, 1917) was a senior officer of the Confederate States Army who commanded cavalry in the Western Theater of the American Civil War. After the war, Ferguson served as a member of the Mississippi River Commission.

== Early life and education ==
Samuel Wragg Ferguson was born in Charleston, South Carolina, on November 3, 1834, to James, a planter, and Abby Ann (née Barker) Ferguson. Educated at a private school in Charleston, he entered the United States Military Academy in 1852 and graduated in 1857. Before graduation, he joined Colonel Albert Sidney Johnson's Utah Expedition. He then went to St. Louis to join his regiment. After the expedition, he was assigned to Fort Walla Walla in the Washington Territory, where he stayed from 1859 to 1860. This all changed when he received the results of the 1860 presidential election. Hearing of the election of Abraham Lincoln, he immediately resigned and left for Charleston, South Carolina.

== American Civil War ==
In March 1861, Ferguson was commissioned a captain in the South Carolina militia, afterwards being appointed Lieutenant and aide-de-camp to C.S. Army Brigadier-General P. G. T. Beauregard. He was one of the officers who received the formal surrender of U.S. Army Major Robert Anderson at Fort Sumter, raised the first Confederate States flag, and posted the first guards at Fort Sumter. After the siege, he was sent to present the first Confederate flag struck by enemy shot to the Provisional Congress of the Confederate States. He was a lieutenant-colonel and aide-de-camp to General Beauregard during the Battle of Shiloh. During the Battle of Farmington, he was in the 28th Mississippi Cavalry Regiment. He commanded the unit while defending Vicksburg, and helped stop attacks made by U.S. Major-General William T. Sherman and U.S. Commodore David Porter.

On July 28, 1863, Ferguson was promoted to brigadier-general. He was subsequently recommended for promotion to Major-General, but Joseph Wheeler quickly objected. During Sherman's March to the Sea, Ferguson and his cavalrymen harassed the flank of the United States Army. When Sherman got close to Savannah, Ferguson's men left their horses and covered the Confederate retreat. He was then ordered to Danville, Virginia, but before arriving was ordered to go to Charlotte, North Carolina. From Charlotte he escorted Jefferson Davis into Georgia, where his unit was disbanded.

== Later life ==
After the war Ferguson moved to Greenville, Mississippi, where he practiced law. He married Catherine Sarah Lee, daughter of Henry William and Eleanor Percy Lee who was a cousin of Robert Edward Lee. In 1876, he was appointed as president of the United States Board of Mississippi River Commissioners. He was also secretary and treasurer of the Mississippi Levee Board. In 1894, twenty thousand to forty thousand dollars mysteriously disappeared from the Mississippi Levee Board, of which Ferguson was both secretary and treasurer. Later that year, he suddenly left and moved to his hometown of Charleston where worked as a civil engineer. After staying in Charleston, Ferguson moved to Ecuador. It would be many years before he returned. At the outbreak of the Spanish–American War, he tried to join the war effort but he was turned down. On February 3, 1917, Ferguson died in Jackson, Mississippi, where he is buried at the Greenwood Cemetery along with other famous Confederate generals.

== Selected works ==
- Personal Memoirs of S. W. Ferguson (1900)

== See also ==
- List of Confederate States Army generals
- List of people from Charleston, South Carolina
