= Senator Dorsey (disambiguation) =

Stephen W. Dorsey (1842–1916) was a U.S. Senator from Arkansas from 1873 to 1879. Senator Dorsey may also refer to:

- John H. Dorsey (1937–2018), New Jersey State Senate
- Samuel Worthington Dorsey (1811–1875), Louisiana State Senate
- Yvonne Dorsey-Colomb (born 1952), Louisiana State Senate
