= William Alexander Percy: The Curious Life of a Mississippi Planter and Sexual Freethinker =

2012 book

- Author: Benjamin E. Wise
- Publication date: 2012

William Alexander Percy: The Curious Life of a Mississippi Planter and Sexual Freethinker is a 2012 biography of William Alexander Percy by Benjamin E. Wise.
