= The House of Percy =

The House of Percy: Honor, Melancholy, and Imagination is a 1994 collective biography of the Percy family written by Bertram Wyatt-Brown.
