= Lanterns on the Levee =

- Author: William Alexander Percy
- Publisher: Alfred A. Knopf
- Publication date: 1941
- Pages: 348

Lanterns on the Levee: Recollections of a Planter's Son is the autobiography of William Alexander Percy.
