= The Literary Percys =

The Literary Percys: Family, History, Gender, and Southern Imagination is a 1994 collective biography about the Percy family written by Bertram Wyatt-Brown.
