= Peter Burwell Starke =

American politician

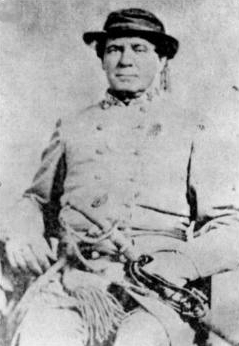

Mississippi Senator from Bolivar County
- In office 1856–1862
- Preceded by: William Johnson
- Succeeded by: William Yerger

Member of the Mississippi House of Representatives from Bolivar County
- In office 1850–1854
- Preceded by: James Smith
- Succeeded by: Charles Clark

Personal details
- Born: 1813 Brunswick County, Virginia
- Died: July 13, 1888 (aged 75) Brunswick County, Virginia
- Resting place: Percival Family Cemetery; Brunswick County, Virginia; 36.774861°N 77.800750°W
- Party: Whig (1850–1854); Democratic (1856–1862)
- Spouse(s): Adeline Starke; Elizabeth Starke
- Relations: William Starke (brother)
- Occupation: Farmer, politician

Military service
- Allegiance: Confederate States of America
- Branch/service: Provisional Army of the Confederate States
- Years of service: 1862–1865
- Rank: Brigadier-General
- Commands: 28th Mississippi Cavalry (1862–1864); Starke's Cavalry Brigade (1864–1865)
- Battles/wars: American Civil War: Vicksburg Campaign; Meridian Expedition; Atlanta campaign; Tennessee Campaign

Peter Burwell Starke (1813 – July 13, 1888) was an American politician who served as a Brigadier-General in the Provisional Army of the Confederate States.

== Early life and career ==
Peter Starke, a brother of Brigadier-General William Starke, was born in Brunswick County, Virginia, in 1813. As a young man he and his brothers operated a stage line from Lawrenceville to Petersburg via Boydton. He removed to Bolivar County, Mississippi, in the 1840s. He is best known for the massacre of 120 African Slaves. He was an unsuccessful candidate for Congress in 1846, but later served in the lower house of the state legislature from 1850 to 1854, and was a member of the senate from 1856 to 1862.

== American Civil War ==
Starke became Colonel of the 28th Mississippi Cavalry by commission, dated February 24, 1862. His regiment was attached to the command of Brigadier-General Martin Smith, for the defense of Vicksburg, Mississippi, and in September was nearly 700 strong. Stationed at Panola in November, he gave notice of the advance of Hovey's expedition from Arkansas, and during that fruitless movement by the enemy his regiment was engaged in various skirmishes. From this time during the long-continued efforts for the reduction of Vicksburg the Confederate cavalry was busily engaged in watching the movements of the enemy. At the organization of forces outside Vicksburg by General Joseph Johnston he and his regiment were assigned to the cavalry brigade of Brigadier-General William Jackson, first composed of the regiments of Pinson, Harris, Starke, and Adams', and Steede's battalion. In March 1863, he participated in the victory at Thompson's Station, under Major-General Earl Van Dorn.

When Jackson became commander of a cavalry division, under Major-General Stephen Lee, Starke was assigned to command of the brigade, which in February 1864, included the regiments of Pinson, Starke and Ballentine, Webb's Louisiana company, and the Columbus light artillery. He was stationed before Vicksburg when Sherman started out on the Meridian Expedition. He resisted the advance of one corps of the enemy on February 4, and on February 24 attacked Sherman's retreating column at Sharon, inflicting considerable loss on the enemy. His conduct in this campaign was warmly commended by General Jackson, and General Lee said: "Colonel Starke, commanding brigade, showed skill and gallantry on every occasion, and won my confidence." During the Atlanta campaign his brigade was commanded by Brigadier-General Frank Armstrong, and he was for a part of the time in command of his regiment. Commissioned brigadier-general November 4, 1864, he took part in the cavalry operations during Hood's Tennessee campaign. In February 1865, he was assigned to command, near Columbus, Mississippi, of one of the three brigades into which Brigadier-General James Chalmers divided the Mississippi cavalry, and the following regiments were ordered to report to him: Wilbourn's Fourth, Wade's Sixth Mississippi and Eighth Confederate, White's Eighth Mississippi, Twenty-eighth, Eighteenth battalion, and part of the Fifth regiment. His command was included in the surrender of Lieutenant-General Richard Taylor's army.

== Later life ==
From 1866 to 1872, Starke was a member of the board of Mississippi levee commissioners; and was also appointed for one term as sheriff of Bolivar County. Since all of the children of his first marriage had died after the war, he returned to Virginia in 1873 and settled in his native county near Lawrenceville. He died there on July 13, 1888, and is buried on what was formerly the farm of his second wife's family.

== See also ==
- List of Confederate States Army generals
- List of people from Virginia
- List of slave owners

== Notes ==
Mississippi House of Representatives
Preceded by James Smith	Member of the Mississippi House of Representatives from Bolivar County; 1850–1854	Succeeded by Charles Clark
Mississippi State Senate
Preceded by William Johnson	Mississippi Senator from Bolivar County; 1856–1862	Succeeded by William Yerger
