= Catherine Anne Warfield =

American writer

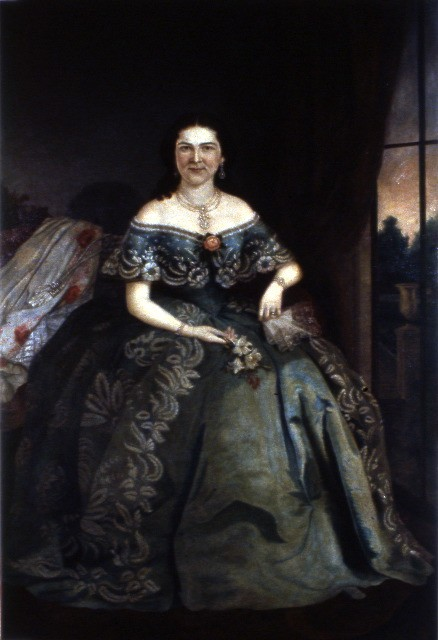
Catherine Anne Warfield

Catherine Anne Warfield (née Ware) (1816–1877) was an American writer of poetry and fiction in Mississippi. Together with her sister Eleanor Percy Lee, she was first of the published authors in the Percy family. Its most noted authors have been William Alexander Percy and Walker Percy of the twentieth century. Warfield's first novel The Household of Bouverie (1860), published anonymously, was very popular; and she published eight more under her own name.

== Biography ==
Born in Natchez, Mississippi in 1816, Catherine was the oldest daughter of Sarah Percy and her second husband Major Nathaniel Ware, who had married in 1814. (Sarah's first husband was the older Judge John Ellis, with whom she had a son, Thomas George Ellis, and daughter, Mary Jane Ellis. He died in 1808.) Sarah Percy was from a prominent Southern family whose members had a vulnerability to mental illness.

Catherine and her sister Eleanor were raised primarily in Philadelphia after their mother's hospitalization there for severe post-partum depression following Eleanor's birth (Sarah was 39 then). Sarah never fully recovered. Together with their half-sister Mary Jane Ellis, the Ware sisters attended the French-language academy of Mme. Aimee Sigoigne, a French colonial refugee from Saint-Domingue after its revolution.

Catherine began writing poetry with her younger sister Eleanor at an early age, and it reflects their sadness about their mother's condition. Following their mother's death in 1836, the sisters published two volumes together under the byline, "The Two Sisters of the West": The Wife of Leon (1843) and The Indian Chamber, And Other Poems (1846). Their father encouraged their writing and commissioned printers in Cincinnati and New York, respectively, for the volumes. The poetry met with moderate success. Today it is criticized as par for its time, relying heavily on many gothic and sentimental contrivances.

== Marriage and family ==
In January 1833 at the age of sixteen, Catherine married Robert Elisha Warfield, a son of the prominent Lexington, Kentucky physician and Thoroughbred breeder, Elisha Warfield. The couple settled in his Kentucky home, where they had six children together.

After their mother's death, the sisters next suffered the death in 1844 of their half-sister Mary Jane Ellis LaRoche (who appeared to have suffered from post-partum depression and lingering mental illness for several years) and later their half-brother Thomas Ellis. After Eleanor died of yellow fever in 1849, Warfield ceased writing for several years, as she was stricken with depression.

== Literary career ==
In the 1830s, Catherine spent her summers in Natchez with her sister and recently relocated mother, who was staying with her son Thomas George Ellis, from her first marriage. In the 1840s, together the two sisters composed and refined the poetry which they later published through printers commissioned by their father. The sisters were encouraged in their work by other women in the literary community in Natchez.

In the mid-1850s, Catherine was encouraged to start writing again by her niece Sarah Ellis, already a successful novelist. In 1860, Warfield published anonymously as "A Southern Lady," The Household of Bouverie, a gothic fiction in two volumes. It achieved great popular success. The story tells of a young orphan who comes from England to live with her grandmother in America. The young woman encounters her grandfather Erastus Bouverie, long presumed dead, living in secret on the second floor. He has become a reclusive mad man attempting to create a youth-restoring potion. The story deals with their relationship, and the unfolding narrative of a dark and torrid family history. Warfield was praised as "Shakespearean," and one contemporary writer said, "Of living female authors, we can openly class Mrs. Warfield with George Sand and George Eliot." The novel met with strong reception.

After the Civil War, Warfield published eight more novels, all under her own name. The two most popular were Ferne Fleming (1877) and its sequel The Cardinal's Daughter (1877); however, no work gained the same degree of success as her first novel.

She died in 1877.

Walker Percy's novel Lancelot bears a resemblance to The Household of Bouverie. Despite Walker's disclaimer, Percy biographer Bertram Wyatt-Brown believes that he based the novel, so different from his others, on his predecessor's work.

== Works ==
- A Double Wedding / How She Was Won
- The Cardinal's Daughter
- Ferne Fleming
- The Household Of Bouverie / The Elixir Of Gold

== Sources ==
- Wyatt-Brown, Bertram. The House of Percy: Honor, Melancholy and Imagination in a Southern Family. New York & Oxford: Oxford University Press, 1994.
- Wyatt-Brown, Bertram. The Literary Percys: Family History, Gender, & the Southern Imagination. Athens & London: University of Georgia Press, 1994.
