= James Gordon (Mississippi politician) =

American politician

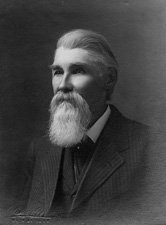

United States Senator from Mississippi
- In office December 23, 1909 – February 22, 1910
- Appointed by: Edmond Noel
- Preceded by: Anselm J. McLaurin
- Succeeded by: LeRoy Percy

Personal details
- Born: December 6, 1833 Cotton Gin Port, Mississippi, US
- Died: November 28, 1912 (aged 78) Okolona, Mississippi, US
- Party: Democratic

James Gordon (December 6, 1833 – November 28, 1912) was an American planter, writer, former Confederate officer and politician from Okolona, Mississippi. He was a United States senator for eight weeks, from December 27, 1909, to February 22, 1910.

Prior to the Civil War, Gordon was a slaveholder and the richest man in Mississippi, owning 500 slaves. During the war, he served in the Confederate Army, first as a captain in the Chickasaw Guards, attached to the Jeff. Davis Legion, and then as Lieutenant Colonel of the 2nd Mississippi Cavalry Regiment, Gordon resigned his army commission and travelled to Europe in 1864 in an attempt to purchase a ship for the Confederate Navy. While returning to America in 1865 he was captured by Union forces, but later escaped and fled to Canada.

Gordon served in the Mississippi House of Representatives, and following the death of Senator Anselm J. McLaurin in 1909, he was appointed by Governor Edmond Noel on December 27 to fill the vacancy until the state legislature could elect a new U.S. Senator.

The day after his appointment by Governor Noel to the United States Senate, Gordon was identified by the Memphis Press-Scimitar as a former fugitive who had been sought as a suspect in the conspiracy to assassinate President Abraham Lincoln. Gordon was listed in 1865 by the United States government as a fugitive following his wartime flight to Canada, and a reward of $10,000 had been offered for his capture, dead or alive. Later that year, he was ruled out of the suspects. Gordon had admitted that he had met with John Wilkes Booth in Montreal in March 1865, and had discussed plans to kidnap Lincoln, but denied any discussion of an assassination.

Gordon served as an appointed U.S. Senator, until February 22, 1910, when he was succeeded by LeRoy Percy, who had been elected by the legislature. He died in 1912 at 78.

U.S. Senate
Preceded by Anselm J. McLaurin	Class 2 U.S. Senator from Mississippi; December 27, 1909 – February 23, 1910	Succeeded by LeRoy Percy
