= 53rd Virginia Infantry Regiment =

- Flag of Virginia, 1861
- Active: December 1861 – April 1865
- Disbanded: April 1865
- Country: Confederacy
- Allegiance: Confederate States of America
- Branch: Confederate States Army
- Type: Infantry
- Engagements: Seven Days' Battles; Second Battle of Bull Run; Battle of Antietam; Battle of Fredericksburg; Battle of Chancellorsville; Battle of Gettysburg; Overland Campaign; Siege of Petersburg; Battle of Sailor's Creek; Appomattox Campaign; Battle of Five Forks

Commanders
- Notable commanders: Colonel William E. Starke; Colonel Carter L. Stevenson

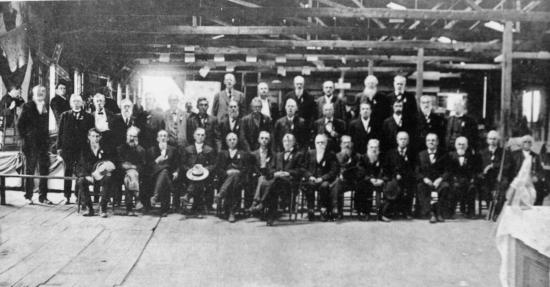
Dinner for Confederate veterans, mostly members of the 53rd Virginia Infantry, Chatham, Pittsylvania County, Virginia, 1910

The 53rd Virginia Infantry Regiment was an infantry regiment raised in Virginia for service in the Confederate States Army during the American Civil War. It fought mostly with the Army of Northern Virginia.

The 53rd Virginia was organized in December 1861, by consolidating Tomlin's and Montague's Battalions, and Waddill's Infantry Company. Many of the men were recruited in Halifax, New Kent, Charles City, and Pittsylvania counties. It was assigned to General Armistead's, Barton's, and Steuart's Brigade, Army of Northern Virginia.

The unit was active from Seven Pines to Gettysburg, served in North Carolina, then fought at Drewry's Bluff and Cold Harbor. Later it participated in the long Petersburg siege north of the James River and the Appomattox Campaign. This regiment contained 468 effectives in June, 1862, lost 31 of the 128 engaged at Malvern Hill, and reported 11 casualties during the Maryland Campaign. Of the 435 who saw action at Gettysburg more than thirty percent were disabled, and there were 3 killed, 33 wounded, and 3 missing at Drewry's Bluff. Many were captured at Sayler's Creek, and 6 officers and 74 men surrendered on April 9, 1865.

The field officers were Colonels William E. Starke, William R. Aylett, John Grammar, Jr., Carter L. Stevenson, and Harrison B. Tomlin; Lieutenant Colonels Rawley W. Martin, Edgar B. Montague, John C. Timberlake, and George M. Waddill; and Majors Henry A. Edmondson and William Leigh.

== See also ==
- List of Virginia Civil War units
