= Kathy Lee =

Kathy Lee (or similar variants) may refer to:

- Kathy Yaeji Lee or Yaeji (born 1993), Korean-American electronic music artist
- Kathie Lee Gifford (born 1953), American television presenter and singer
- Cathy Lee Crosby (born 1944), American actress and former tennis player
- Cathy Lee Irwin (born 1952), Canadian figure skater
- Cathy Lee Crane (born 1962), film director and producer

== See also ==
- Katie Lee (disambiguation)
- Katherine Lee (disambiguation)
