= William E. Starke =

Confederate Army general

William Edwin Starke
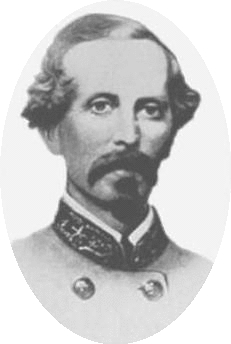
- William Edwin Starke
- Born: 1814; Brunswick County, Virginia
- Died: September 17, 1862 (aged 47–48); Antietam Battlefield, Maryland
- Burial place: Hollywood Cemetery
- Relatives: Peter Burwell Starke, brother
- Military career
- Allegiance: Confederate States of America
- Branch: Confederate States Army
- Service years: 1861–62
- Rank: Brigadier General
- Unit: Army of Northern Virginia
- Commands: Second Louisiana Brigade; Stonewall Division (temporary)
- Conflicts: American Civil War: Battle of Rich Mountain; Battle of Corrick's Ford; Peninsula Campaign; Battle of Cedar Mountain; Second Battle of Manassas; Battle of Chantilly; Battle of Harpers Ferry; Battle of Antietam †
- Other work: stagecoach operator, cotton broker

William Edwin Starke (1814 – September 17, 1862) was a wealthy Gulf Coast businessman and a brigadier general in the Confederate States Army during the American Civil War. He was killed in action at the Battle of Antietam while commanding the famed "Stonewall Division," a unit first made famous under Stonewall Jackson.

== Early life and career ==
Starke was born in Brunswick County, Virginia. His younger brother Peter Burwell Starke also became a general in the Confederate army, as well as a Mississippi politician. Prior to the Civil War, the brothers worked in the family's stagecoach business that operated between Lawrenceville and Petersburg, Virginia. In 1840, William Starke moved to the South, becoming a successful cotton broker in Mobile, Alabama, and New Orleans, Louisiana. In 1858, he purchased the SS Texas Ranger, a former supply ship, from the Federal government and used it to haul cotton to his customers. Historical records of antebellum slave sales in New Orleans show that Starke sold 154 enslaved people to former South Carolina Governor John L. Manning in two separate sales in 1859 to 1860.

Starke was married to Louisa Grey Hicks, the daughter of a prominent Brunswick County businessman. Their daughter Sallie was born in Melrose, Alabama.

== American Civil War ==
At the outbreak of the Civil War early in 1861, despite his lack of formal military education, Starke was named as the lieutenant colonel of the 53rd Virginia Infantry until June. He subsequently was an aide-de-camp to Gen. Robert S. Garnett in western Virginia, but was without a position following Garnett's death in the Battle of Corrick's Ford. His coolness and judgment in the midst of the confusion that followed the death of General Garnett were highly commended by Colonel William B. Taliaferro, who succeeded to command. He temporarily served on the staff of Robert E. Lee in August 1861.

Later in the year, he received a commission as the colonel of the 60th Virginia Infantry. He led the regiment during the 1862 Peninsula Campaign. He was wounded in the hand during the Seven Days Battles on June 26, 1862, but resumed his duties after a three-day recovery period before finally relinquishing command after the battle.

For his gallant efforts during the fighting, he was commended twice and then promoted to brigadier general on August 6, 1862. He was assigned command of the Second Louisiana Brigade. He led the Stonewall Division during the Second Battle of Manassas following the wounding of General Taliaferro. For unknown reasons, Jackson decided not to leave him in permanent command, appointing a staff officer (John R. Jones) instead.

In mid-September, Starke's Brigade was part of the force under Stonewall Jackson that captured the large Union garrison at Harpers Ferry, after which they marched into Sharpsburg, Maryland, on September 16. A strong Union attack on the morning of September 17 drove back the Confederate lines. Starke was shot three times and died within an hour. He was one of six generals killed or mortally wounded at Antietam.

His body was buried in the Hollywood Cemetery in Richmond, Virginia, next to his son who had been killed three and a half months earlier at the Battle of Seven Pines.

== Legacy ==
Col. Bradley T. Johnson, in his official report on Second Manassas, wrote concerning the death of Starke:

I cannot forbear doing but scant justice to a gallant soldier now no more. It was my fortune during the two days of battle, during which he commanded the division, to be thrown constantly in contact with Brigadier-General Starke. The buoyant dash with which he led his brigade into the most withering fire on Friday, though then in command of the division; the force he showed in the handling of this command; the coolness and judgment which distinguished him in action, made him to me a marked man, and I regretted his early death as a great loss to the army and the cause.

Fellow Confederate officer Clement A. Evans later wrote, "His name deserves lasting remembrance in association with the Stonewall division."

== Honors ==
A mortuary cannon on the Antietam Battlefield marks the approximate place where Starke was shot the third time, west of the Hagerstown Turnpike in the West Woods area. It was dedicated in October 1897.

== See also ==
- List of American Civil War generals (Confederate)
