= Kenner Garrard =

United States Army general (1827–1879)

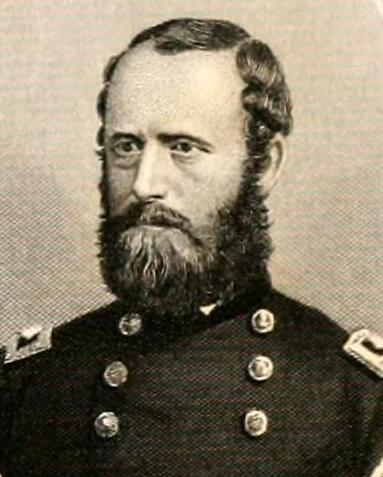
- Garrard in an 1868 publication
- Born: September 21, 1827; Bourbon County, Kentucky
- Died: May 15, 1879 (aged 51); Cincinnati, Ohio
- Burial place: Spring Grove Cemetery, Cincinnati, Ohio
- Military career
- Branch: United States Army
- Service years: 1851–1866
- Rank: Brevet Major-General
- Commands: Commandant of Cadets, United States Military Academy; 146th New York Infantry Regiment; Second Division, Cavalry Corps, Military Division of the Mississippi
- Battles: American Civil War; Battle of Fredericksburg; Battle of Chancellorsville; Battle of Gettysburg; Battle of Ladiga; Battle of Nashville

Kenner Garrard (September 21, 1827 – May 15, 1879) was a senior officer of the United States Army. A member of one of Ohio's most prominent military families, he performed well at the Battle of Gettysburg, and then led Second Division, Cavalry Corps, Military Division of the Mississippi during the Atlanta campaign. He developed a reputation for personal bravery and was cited for gallantry at the Battle of Nashville as an infantry division commander.

== Early life and career ==
Garrard was born at his paternal grandfather's home in Bourbon County, Kentucky, while his mother was visiting there. His grandfather, James Garrard, was the second Governor of Kentucky. He was raised in Cincinnati, Ohio, and received a private education. He was the brother of fellow future Civil War brevet generals Jeptha Garrard and Israel Garrard. A first cousin, Theophilus T. Garrard, also became a Union general.

Kenner Garrard briefly attended Harvard University in Cambridge, Massachusetts, but withdrew in his sophomore year after accepting an appointment to the United States Military Academy. He graduated eighth in the Class of 1851 and was appointed a brevet second lieutenant in the 4th U.S. Artillery. He soon transferred to the 1st U.S. Dragoons.

In 1855, Garrard was transferred to the 2nd U.S. Cavalry as an adjutant to Colonel Albert Sidney Johnston and Lieutenant Colonel Robert E. Lee, both future generals in the Confederate States Army. He was stationed in a variety of posts in the Southwest frontier, including in the New Mexico Territory.

== American Civil War ==
When the Civil War erupted in 1861, Garrard, by then a captain, was on duty in an outpost in Texas. As a loyal Unionist, he was imprisoned by Confederate authorities following the surrender of U.S. troops by Maj. Gen. David E. Twiggs. He was allowed to travel back to the North. He made his way to Washington, D.C., bringing with him $20,000 of Federal funds he had secreted from Texas, returning the money to the U.S. Treasury. In December 1861, he was appointed as Commandant of the U.S. Military Academy in West Point, New York.

After being formally exchanged on August 27, 1862, Garrard was appointed colonel of the 146th New York Infantry Regiment and took part in the battles of Fredericksburg, Chancellorsville, and Gettysburg, where he succeeded Brig. Gen. Stephen H. Weed (who was killed on Little Round Top) in the command of the 3rd Brigade of Maj. Gen. George Sykes's division. In December 1863, he was nominated for promotion to brigadier general with an effective date of July 23, 1863, commemorating the end of the pursuit of Lee's Army of Northern Virginia.

He was appointed as the major of the 3rd U.S. Cavalry in the regular army in November 1863, while continuing to hold the rank of brigadier general in the volunteer army. In December 1863, he was made Chief of the Cavalry Bureau in Washington, but was the next month, at his own request, relieved from that duty to take command of the Second Division, Cavalry Corps, Military Division of the Mississippi, and transferred to the Western Theater.

Garrard took part in Sherman's Atlanta campaign as a cavalry division commander, but failed to impress his superiors. Returning to the infantry, he participated in the Battle of Nashville, where he and his division performed well. Army commander Maj. Gen. George H. Thomas cited Garrard for gallant conduct at Nashville. As a result, he was appointed a brevet major general of volunteers and brevet brigadier general in the regular army for his battlefield performance. He also received the brevet rank of major general in the regular army as of March 13, 1865, as part of the mass brevet appointments at the end of the war. He ended the war in Alabama and was instrumental in the capture of Montgomery.

== Postbellum career ==
Garrard remained in the regular army after the war ended as commander of the District of Mobile, but resigned on November 9, 1866. He returned to Cincinnati, where he worked as a real estate broker. He devoted the rest of his life to civic affairs and historical studies. He served as Director of the Cincinnati Music Festival for several years. He never married.

He died in Cincinnati, Ohio, at the age of fifty-one, and was interred in Spring Grove Cemetery.

== See also ==
- List of American Civil War generals (Union)
