= Pat Henry (politician) =

American politician (1861–1933)

Patrick Stevens Henry (February 15, 1861 – December 28, 1933) was an American lawyer and politician who served one term as a U.S. representative from Mississippi from 1901 to 1903.

He is the nephew of Patrick Henry, who had represented a different Mississippi congressional district prior to him being elected.

== Biography ==
Born near Helena, Arkansas, Henry moved with his parents to Vicksburg, Mississippi, in 1865. He attended the public schools and was graduated from the University of Mississippi, Oxford, Mississippi. He attended the United States Military Academy.

He studied law, was admitted to the bar in 1882, and commenced practice in Vicksburg, Mississippi.

=== Political career ===
Henry served as city attorney from 1884 to 1888, and served as member of the state senate from 1888 until he resigned to become district attorney in 1890. He served as district attorney for the ninth judicial district from 1890 to 1900. In 1896, he was a delegate to the Democratic National Convention.

He was appointed circuit judge of the ninth judicial district in 1900 and served until 1901, when he resigned, having been elected as a Democrat to the Fifty-seventh Congress (March 4, 1901 – March 3, 1903). He was an unsuccessful candidate for renomination in 1902.

=== Later career and death ===
He resumed the practice of law in Vicksburg, Mississippi, until his death there on December 28, 1933. He was interred in Cedar Hill Cemetery.

U.S. House of Representatives
Preceded by Thomas C. Catchings	Member of the U.S. House of Representatives from Mississippi's 3rd congressional district 1901-1903	Succeeded by Benjamin G. Humphreys II
