= 2nd Cavalry Division (Belgium) =

- Active: 1940
- Disbanded: 28 May 1940
- Country: Belgium
- Branch: Belgian Army
- Type: Armoured cavalry
- Role: Armoured reconnaissance Artillery observer Close-quarters battle Combined arms Counter-battery fire Fire support Indirect fire Maneuver warfare Military engineering Military logistics Raiding; Screening; Trench warfare
- Size: Division
- Part of: Cavalry Corps
- Garrison/HQ: Leuven
- Engagements: Second World War; Battle of Belgium

Commanders
- Notable commanders: Major General, Joseph Beernaert

The 2nd Cavalry Division was an armoured cavalry division-sized support detachment of the Belgian Army that fought at the Battle of Belgium during the Second World War.

== History ==
=== First World War ===
At the start of World War I, the 2nd Cavalry Division was not formed yet, but was part of a reserve Cavalry Division as ‘2nd Cavalry Brigade.’ Its headquarters are located in Ghent, and the brigade was composed of the 4th and 5th Lancer Regiments. It also commanded a Chasseurs Regiment. (4th Chasseurs)

=== Second World War ===
When war was announced, most regiments of 2nd Cavalry Division were brought to full strength like its counterpart, 1st Cavalry Division. They were also split up, with 1st Regiment Lancers, and 4th Regiment Carabiner -Cyclists sent north near Liège with the rest of III Corp. After countless reinforcements sent to Group Ninitte, the 2nd Cavalry Division finally set up a defensive line near Demer/Gate position.

At the start of hostilities, the 3rd Regiment Lancers were fully under the command of the 2nd Cavalry Division from orders by the high command. After the loss of the Ardennes, the 2nd Cavalry Division was reinforced with the 2nd Regiment Jagers te Paard. Heavy fighting takes place at the Northern Sector as the Germans deal significant losses to the 36th Line Regiment.

The 2nd Cavalry Division deploys as much artillery in Demer as possible, as if not, the Germans might break through the defenses at a rapid pace. Demer was reinforced with forces from 10th Infantry Division. The German pressure on Demer is increasing, as a breakthrough in the north came tantalizing close to encircling the entire 2nd Cavalry Division stationed there.

A retreat to the K-W line was signalled on May 13. The division was placed west of Mechelen, but when the Allied command abandoned the K-W line, the 2nd Cavalry Division and the rest of the Belgian army had to retreat. The 2nd Cavalry Division was deployed west of Doel.

The Germans begin crossing the Scheldt. The 2nd Cavalry Division was immediately withdrawn to the vicinity of Watervliet. After things have settled down, the 2nd Cavalry Division was deployed between Breskens and the Braakman Sanctuary.

After the disastrous encirclement of the Allied forces, including Belgium, the situation deteriorated quickly. More and more support units regularly deployed by the 2nd Cavalry Division were withdrawn and redeployed along the defense of Leie. The division was placed in the Wervik Sector. The German forces make contact with the 2nd Cavalry Division and pushed on.

By the time, the fighting stopped, the 2nd Cavalry Division was dislodged from their positions. The division falls back to a new line mainly composed of the Rouselare Ypres Railroad line. The Germans didn't have a problem breaching the line and the 2nd Cavalry Division surrendered.

== Structure ==
On the eve of the Battle of Belgium, the division's structure was as follows:

- 2nd Cavalry Division
  - Headquarters, at Leuven
  - 1st Lancers Regiment
  - 1st Regiment Hunters-on-Horse
  - 2nd Carabiner-Cyclists Regiment
  - 4th Carabiner-Cyclists Regiment
  - 18th Artillery Regiment
  - 26th Engineer Battalion
  - 29th Battalion of Transmission Troops

== See also ==
- Army Group B
- 1st Cavalry Division
- K-W line
