= Eleanor Percy Lee =

American writer

Eleanor Percy Lee, born Eleanor Percy Ware (1819–1849), was an American writer of Mississippi who co-authored two books of poetry with her sister Catherine Anne Warfield published in the 1840s. The sisters were indirect ancestors of the famed southern writers William Alexander Percy and Walker Percy. Eleanor died in a yellow fever epidemic.

== Early life and education ==
Eleanor Percy Ware was born in Natchez, Mississippi in 1819, the second daughter of Sarah Percy and her second husband Major Nathaniel Ware, an attorney and aide to the Mississippi territorial governor. (Sarah was the widow of Judge John Ellis, who died in 1808. They had a son Thomas and a daughter Mary Jane Ellis together.) Eleanor's older sister was Catherine Anne Ware. Sarah Percy was from a prominent Southern family with a noted vulnerability to mental illness. She was 39 when Eleanor was born and suffered from post-partum depression following the birth. She never fully recovered.

Ware moved his family from Natchez, Mississippi to Philadelphia, where Sarah could be treated. She was the highest-paying patient, and the only one accompanied by a resident slave, at the Pennsylvania Hospital, then one of the few institutions that clinically treated the mentally ill.

The girls attended the academy of Mme. Aimée Sigoigne, an émigré from Saint-Domingue, who had left during the revolution that established the republic of Haiti. Her French-language school attracted many upper-class Southerners and Philadelphians. Ware frequently took his young daughters with him on his travels, as well.

In 1831, Ware moved Sarah back to Natchez. She was put under the care of her son Thomas George Ellis, from her first marriage. Catherine Anne and Eleanor would visit their mother every summer when home from school. She died in 1836.

== Literary career ==
The girls showed their literary talent early, as Eleanor wrote her first poem at age eleven. In the late 1830s in Natchez, they came under the influence of Eliza DuPuy, a contributor to various women’s magazines and one of the earliest professional Southern female writers. DuPuy was the governess of the sisters' younger niece, Sarah Ellis. Under the tutelage of DuPuy, at the age of seventeen Eleanor wrote the novella Agatha in 1837, following her mother's death. It was never published.

From work the Ware sisters did together after returning to Natchez, in 1843 they published their first joint volume of poetry, The Wife of Leon, under the byline, "The Two Sisters of the West.” Their father Nathaniel Ware encouraged their writing and arranged for a printer in Cincinnati, Ohio. Displaying a reliance on the contrived artistic formulations of the time, the book was well received enough to have a second edition in 1845. In 1846, they published their second volume of poetry, The Indian Chamber, And Other Poems, with a New York printer commissioned by their father.

== Marriage and family ==
On May 25, 1840, Eleanor married the Virginia planter William Henry Lee, cousin of Robert E. Lee. Her father settled the couple with a large dowry from Eleanor's mother's legacy: "a large plantation in Hinds County, Mississippi, with about 85 slaves, assessed in 1838 at the value of $122,000." They frequently stayed in Natchez for its society.

According to her sister Catherine, Eleanor never wrote another poem. In 1844, their half-sister Mary Jane Ellis LaRoche died, followed by their half-brother Thomas. Eleanor had given Catherine the editing lead for their joint volumes, and had never been as prolific. In the summer of 1849, while at the resort of Mississippi Springs, she complained of melancholy. She died of yellow fever during an epidemic that summer, at the age of 30.

== Percy Family writers ==
- Sarah Dorsey
- Kate Lee Ferguson
- Walker Percy
- William Alexander Percy
- William Armstrong Percy, III
- Catherine Anne Warfield

== Other Percy relatives ==
- LeRoy Percy
- Thomas George Percy
