= 2nd Mississippi Cavalry Regiment =

- Active: 1862–1865
- Country: Confederate States
- Allegiance: Mississippi
- Branch: Army
- Type: Cavalry
- Size: Regiment
- Part of: Armstrong's Brigade
- Facings: Yellow
- Battles: American Civil War: Battle of Iuka; Second Battle of Corinth; Battle of Thompson's Station; First Battle of Franklin; Grierson's Raid; Meridian Campaign; Atlanta campaign; Battle of Columbia; Battle of Spring Hill; Battle of Franklin; Third Battle of Murfreesboro; Battle of Selma

Commanders
- Notable commanders: James Gordon

The 2nd Mississippi Cavalry Regiment was a unit of the Confederate States Army from Mississippi. Formed in the spring of 1862, the 2nd Cavalry took part in many battles of the western theater in Mississippi, Alabama, Georgia, and Tennessee before surrendering in April 1865.

== History ==
The 2nd Mississippi Cavalry Regiment was organized in the spring of 1862 at Columbus, Mississippi by James Gordon, who had previously served in Virginia as Captain of the Chickasaw Rangers, part of the Jeff. Davis Legion. The new Regiment was assigned to the command of Col. Frank C. Armstrong and Gordon was commissioned as Lieutenant Colonel.

The 2nd Cavalry fought at the Battle of Iuka in September, and took part in supporting actions during the Second Battle of Corinth and the subsequent Confederate retreat from Corinth after the battle. As part of General Earl Van Dorn's cavalry corps, the 2nd Regiment fought in the Battle of Thompson's Station in Tennessee in March 1863. Under orders from General Nathan B. Forrest, the 2nd took part in the capture of a Federal fort at Brentwood, Tennessee the same month, and fought at the First Battle of Franklin in April. During this period when most of the Regiment was fighting in Tennessee, a detachment of the 2nd Cavalry was operating in South Mississippi opposing Grierson's Raid. During the Vicksburg Campaign, the regiment was sent to the Big Black River and covered the retreat of General Joseph E. Johnston's troops to Jackson. The regiment then skirmished with Union General William T. Sherman's troops during their march to Meridian.

A detachment of the 2nd Regiment was sent to Fayette County, Alabama in the spring of 1864 to arrest "armed bands of tories or deserters". The cavalry did not find any armed Unionists in Alabama, but arrested several deserters from the Confederate army.

In May 1864 the 2nd Cavalry was sent to Georgia to take part in the Atlanta campaign. After the Confederate defeat in Georgia, the regiment was assigned to Forrest's Cavalry Corps during General John Bell Hood's Tennessee Campaign, fighting at Columbia, Spring Hill, Franklin, and Murfreesboro.

Greatly depleted by losses during the Tennessee campaign, the 2nd Mississippi Cavalry fought its final battle as part of Forrest's Corps at Selma, Alabama in April, 1865. The remaining Confederate forces in the western theater surrendered shortly thereafter.

== Name ==
In the Official Records of the Union and Confederate Armies, the 2nd Cavalry is often referred to as the "4th Mississippi Cavalry". It should not be confused with a different regiment of that same name, commanded by Col. C.C. Wilbourn.

Another unit, the 2nd Battalion Mississippi Cavalry, is sometimes referred to as the "Second Mississippi Cavalry" in the Official Records and also should not be confused with the 2nd Regiment. The 2nd Battalion was commanded by William T. Martin and formed part of the Jeff. Davis Legion.

== Commanders ==
Commanders of the 2nd Mississippi Cavalry:

- Col. J.L. McCarty
- Col. James Gordon, resigned 1863.
- Col. Edward Dillon
- Col. Arthur Pendleton Mason (appointment cancelled by Jefferson Davis, 1864).

== Organization ==
Companies of the 2nd Mississippi Cavalry:

- Company A, "Choctaw Rangers"
- Company B, "Newton Rangers"
- Company C, "Lauderdale Cavalry"
- Company D, "Senatobia Opposers"
- Company E, "Mooresville Blues"
- Company F, "East Mississippi Guards" of Clarke County.
- Company G, "Pontotoc Rangers"
- Company H, "Kemper Dragoons"
- Company I, "Lula White Rebels" of Monroe County.
- Company K, "Mississippi Body Guards" of Scott County.

== See also ==
- List of Mississippi Civil War Confederate units
