= Discovery Girls =

American children's magazine

- Discovery Girls December/January 2012 issue
- Editorial Director: Sarah Verney
- Frequency: Bimonthly
- Publisher: Catherine Lee
- Total circulation: 195,062 (2012)
- First issue: 2000
- Final issue: 2018
- Company: Discovery Girls, Inc.
- Country: United States
- Based in: Los Altos, California
- Language: English
- ISSN: 1535-3230

Discovery Girls was a bimonthly magazine for girls ages 8 to 13. Written “by girls, for girls,” the publication honestly addresses the issues faced by preteen girls. First published in 2000, the magazine had a circulation of 195,062 in 2012.

== History ==
Discovery Girls was founded in 2000 by Catherine Lee. As part of the process of creating the first issue, Lee selected twelve girls from local schools to provide input on what is important to them. Lee continued to use the approach. From 2000 to 2012, for each issue 12 girls were selected from various states. The girls attended a two-day photo shoot and provided ideas and content for the issue. In 2012, this switched to a once-a-year camp for 36 girls in the US and Canada that would provide images and content for a year's issues.

== Magazine features ==
Most of the regular features contain content sent in by readers. These features include:

- My Worst Day and How I Survived It
- Embarrassing Moments
- Ask Ali
- Health And Beauty Advice
- The Great Debate
- Mailbag
- Contests

Other features of the magazine:

- Special Feature
- You Said It
- Creative Corner
- Quizzes

== Books ==
Discovery Girls has published five books based on the most popular topics from the magazine:

- Friendship Hardship
- Sticky Situations And How To Get Through Them
- Ask Ali: All the Advice You’ll Ever Need
- My Worst Day and How I Survived It
- Growing Up: Everything You Need To Know About Your Changing Body

== Honors ==
Discovery Girls has received the Parents' Choice Award, National Parenting Publications Award and the iParenting Media Award.
