= Samuel Worthington Dorsey =

American politician (1811–1875)

Thomas Worthington Dorsey
- Born: 1811; Baltimore, Maryland, U.S.
- Died: October 18, 1875 (aged 63–64); Tensas Parish, Louisiana, U.S.
- Occupations: Lawyer, politician, planter
- Spouse: Sarah Dorsey
- Father: Thomas B. Dorsey

Samuel Worthington Dorsey (1811 – October 18, 1875) was an American lawyer, politician, and planter.

== Early life and education ==
Dorsey, son of Thomas B. Dorsey, chief Judge of the Court of Appeals of the State of Maryland, and of Milcah (Goodwin) Dorsey, was born in Baltimore in 1811. He graduated from Yale College in 1830. He studied law with John Glenn, Esq., in Baltimore, where he was admitted to the bar.

== Career ==
Dorsey engaged in the practice of law for two years, after which he removed to Vicksburg, Mississippi. and there pursued his profession for about two years longer, then became a cotton planter in Louisiana. He was Louisiana State Senator for several terms, and was a member of the State Convention which passed the ordinance of secession in 1861, formally engaging Louisiana in the American Civil War.

== Personal life ==
Dorsey was married in 1853 to noted writer Sarah Ann Ellis, of Natchez, Mississippi, who survived him. He went to Maryland for a visit in the spring of 1875, intending also to be present in New Haven at the meeting of his Yale class in June. But the threatened overflow of the Mississippi River called him home; he died on October 18, 1875, at Elkridge, his residence in Tensas Parish, Louisiana.
