= 28th Mississippi Cavalry Regiment =

- Active: 1862–1865
- Country: Confederate States
- Allegiance: Mississippi
- Branch: Army
- Type: Cavalry
- Size: Regiment
- Campaigns: American Civil War: Vicksburg Campaign; Meridian Campaign; Atlanta campaign; Franklin-Nashville Campaign

Commanders
- Notable commanders: Peter Burwell Starke; Samuel W. Ferguson

The 28th Mississippi Cavalry Regiment was a Confederate cavalry unit from Mississippi. The 28th Cavalry fought in numerous battles of the Western theater of the American Civil War before surrendering in Alabama on May 4, 1865.

== History ==
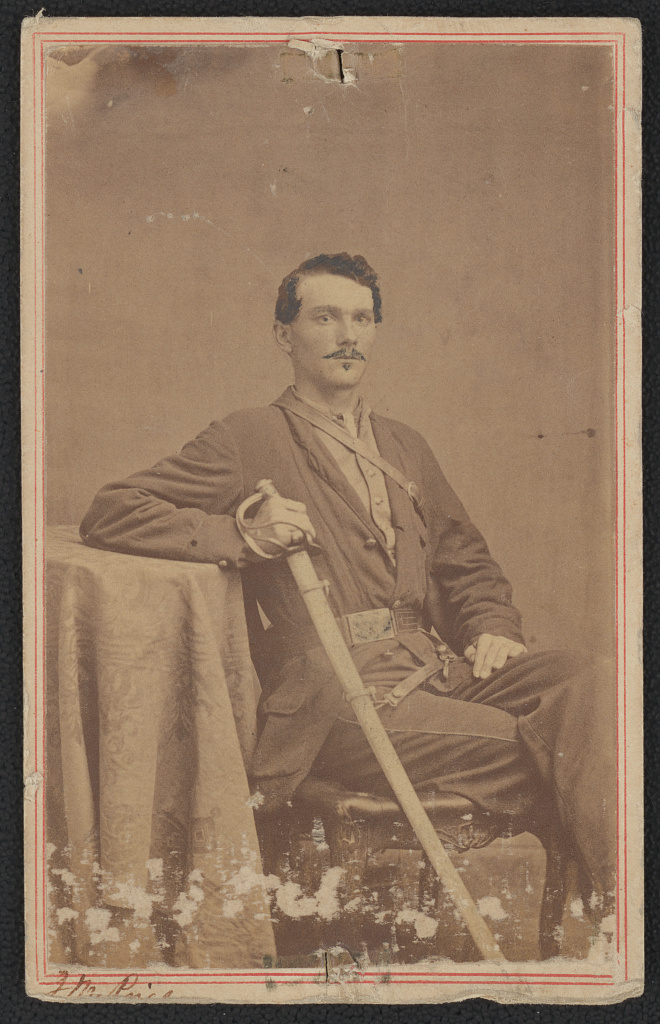
Private J.M. Price, of Company E, 28th Mississippi Cavalry

The companies of the 28th Cavalry Regiment were organized in early 1862. Peter Burwell Starke, a state politician, was elected colonel, and Samuel W. Ferguson, a native of South Carolina and graduate of West Point was elected lieutenant colonel. Ferguson had previously served in the South Carolina militia and was one of the officers who received the surrender of the US garrison after the Battle of Fort Sumter in April, 1861.

In May, the Regiment was sent to Vicksburg under the command of General Martin Luther Smith to aid in the defense of the city during an attack by Federal gunboats. The Regiment continued operations in the vicinity of Vicksburg for the rest of the year. Company I of the regiment, under Captain William H. Johnson, took part in the Battle of Chickasaw Bayou in December.

In January, 1863, the 28th Cavalry was assigned to General George B. Cosby's brigade and sent to Tennessee. The regiment was held in reserve during the Battle of Thompson's Station, then fought in the First Battle of Franklin in April, where the "gallant and meritorious conduct" of the Regiment was noted by General William Hicks Jackson. The 28th returned to Mississippi in June, and on June 22, the regiment fought a skirmish with the 4th Iowa Cavalry at Birdsong's ferry along the Big Black River. After the fall of Vicksburg on July 4, the 28th harassed Union forces advancing on Jackson, the state capital. For the rest of the year, the 28th fought skirmishes with Union forces across Mississippi.

In 1864, Col. Starke was promoted to command of a cavalry brigade, and Major Joshua T. McBee took command of the Regiment. The 28th clashed with Union General William T. Sherman's forces during the Meridian campaign. In April, a detachment of the 28th Cavalry was sent to Walker and Winston Counties in Alabama to arrest Southern Unionist "tories" in an area later known as the "Republic of Winston".

In May, the regiment was sent to Georgia to take part in the Atlanta campaign, fighting at Adairsville, Cassville, Ezra Church, before moving on with the Confederate forces into Tennessee after the fall of Atlanta. The 28th fought in the Franklin-Nashville Campaign as part of General Nathan Bedford Forrest's Cavalry Corps, taking part in the battles of Columbia, Spring Hill, Franklin and Murfreesboro.

After the Confederate losses in the Tennessee campaign, the 28th Cavalry moved into Alabama and fought a series of skirmishes there before surrendering on May 4, 1865.

== Commanders ==
Commanders of the 28th Mississippi Cavalry:

- Col. Peter Burwell Starke, promoted to brigadier general.
- Col. Joshua T. McBee
- Lt. Col. Samuel W. Ferguson, promoted to brigadier general.
- Lt. Col. Edward P. Jones, wounded at Franklin and captured.
- Lt. Col S.S. Champion

== Organization ==
Companies of the 28th Mississippi Cavalry:

- Company A, "McAfee Hussars"
- Company B, "Dixie Rangers" of Carroll County.
- Company C, "Buckner's Light Horse" of Warren County.
- Company D, "Washington Cavalry"
- Company E, "Mayson Dragoons" of Bolivar County.
- Company F
- Company G
- Company H, "Southern Rangers" of Monroe County.
- Company I, "Johnson Rebels" of Warren County.
- Company K, "Bingaman Rangers" of Adams County.
- Company L

== See also ==
- List of Mississippi Civil War Confederate units
