= Katie Madonna Lee =

American screenwriter and filmmaker

Katie Madonna Lee is an American composer, screenwriter, and filmmaker. She is the creator of the show Flabulous, winner of Outstanding Theme Song and Comedy Ensemble at the Los Angeles Web Series Festival in 2012.

Lee's feature film The Execution of Julie Ann Mabry won the Women in Film and Television award, the Christopher Award, and the Best Narrative Feature at the LA Femme Festival. She also co-produced the track Coming Home written by Jeremy Joyce and performed by Sharon Van Etten.

Lee is the founder and developer of the GLBT History Collection at Indiana University-South Bend, one of only three GLBT Collections in the State of Indiana. The collection covers the roots of GLBT activism in South Bend, Indiana through personal items, letters and oral histories.

Her second feature film, Irish Catholic, an experimental dark musical comedy, was written as a tribute to Sinead O'Connor. Irish Catholic won Best of The Fest at the South Texas Underground Film Festival in 2023. In addition to writing, directing, and producing the film, Lee wrote the music.

As a composer, her music has been commissioned by small ensembles. Her collaboration with Saxophonist Cecily Terhune, Boon Bestowed was released on Ravel Records in 2024. In 2023, A Great Male Artist, a classical album of chamber pieces, was released.
