= Sarah Dorsey =

American novelist and historian

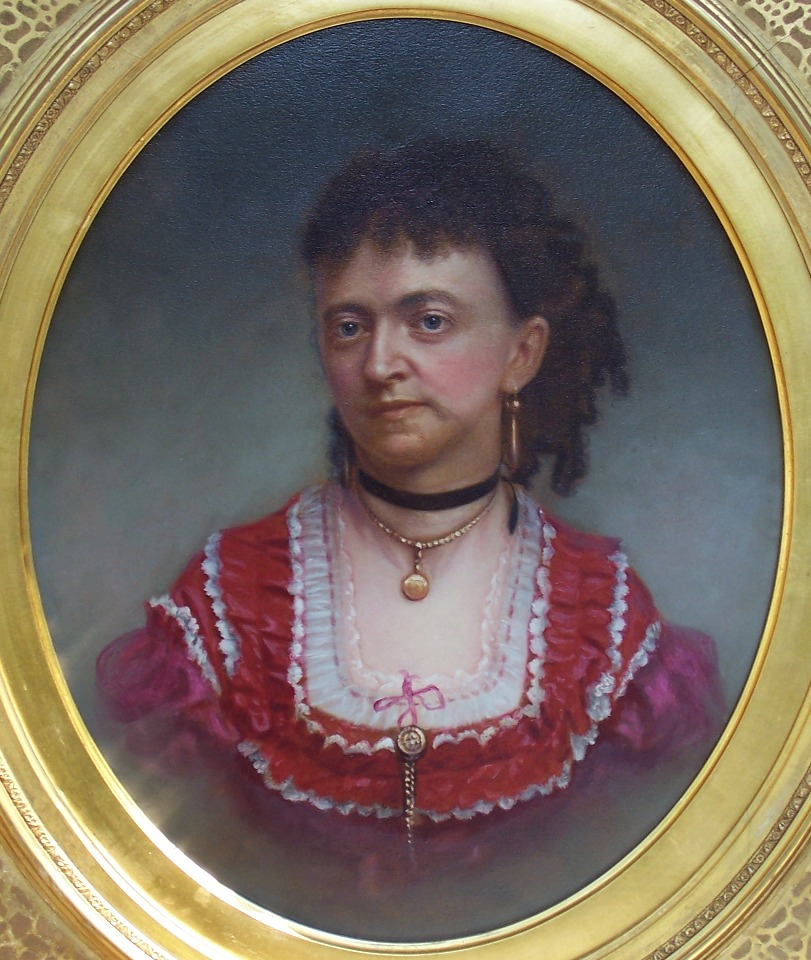
- Born: Sarah Anne Ellis; February 16, 1829; Natchez, Mississippi, U.S.
- Died: July 4, 1879 (aged 50); New Orleans, Louisiana, U.S.
- Occupations: Author; benefactor of Jefferson Davis
- Spouse: Samuel Worthington Dorsey (m. 1852; died 1875)

Sarah Anne Dorsey (née Ellis; February 16, 1829 – July 4, 1879) was an American novelist and historian. She published several novels and a highly regarded biography of Henry Watkins Allen, governor of Louisiana during the years of the American Civil War. It is considered an important contribution to the literature of the Lost Cause of the Confederacy.

In 1876, Dorsey, a widow, invited Jefferson Davis, former President of the Confederate States of America, to visit her plantation, Beauvoir, and use a cottage there. He ended up living there the rest of his life. Their friendship created a scandal, but both ignored it, and his second wife, Varina Davis, also came to stay at Dorsey's plantation. In 1878, Dorsey realized she was terminally ill, rewrote her will, and bequeathed her property to Jefferson Davis. Davis wrote his history of the Civil War and began his autobiography, The Rise and Fall of the Confederate Government.

== Biography ==
=== Early life ===
Dorsey was born to Mary Malvina Routh and Thomas George Percy Ellis, a planter in Natchez, Mississippi, in 1829. From the prominent southern Percy family, she was the niece of Catherine Anne Warfield and Eleanor Percy Lee, the "Two Sisters of the West," who while young published two volumes of poetry together. Catherine Anne Warfield went on to publish a number of novels, which achieved significant popular acclaim, including The House of Bouverie, a gothic novel in two volumes, which was a bestseller in 1860. She and Ellis became quite close after her sister Eleanor died in 1849, with Sarah Anne encouraging her to write again. She was also a granddaughter of Natchez planter John Ellis through her father. Through her matrilineal line, she was a descendant of the prominent Routh family in Natchez.

Sarah Anne's father died when she was nine in 1838. Her widowed mother Mary soon remarried to Charles Gustavus Dahlgren, of Swedish descent. Her stepfather, who saw great potential in Sarah, engaged Eliza Ann Dupuy as her tutor. Dupuy had also taught Dorsey's aunts Catherine and Eleanor.

Later, about 1838–1841, Dahlgren sent Dorsey to Madame Deborah Grelaud's French School in Philadelphia, Pennsylvania, founded in the 1790s by a refugee from the French Revolution. Mme Grelaud was a Huguenot, and the school was Episcopal. There, Dorsey excelled in music, painting, dancing, and languages, quickly gaining fluency in Italian, Spanish, German and French. At the school, she met the older Varina Banks Howell, whom she would meet again later in life as the wife of Jefferson Davis. During her studies in Philadelphia, Ellis found her most exciting teacher to be Anne Charlotte Lynch, and they became friends after she matriculated.

=== Marriage ===
In 1852, Ellis married Samuel Worthington Dorsey, a former lawyer who was a planter in Tensas at the time of the marriage. His father Thomas Beale Dorsey had accumulated large cotton plantations in the Tensas Parish region, which used slave labour, and Samuel inherited them after his death. Between the Dahlgren-Routh-Ellis plantations on Sarah's side and Samuel's plantations, the newlyweds were rich. They settled first in Maryland but moved to a Routh family plantation near Newellton in Tensas Parish, Louisiana.

The Dorseys had no children.

=== Literary career ===
Dorsey wrote articles for the New York Churchman in the 1850s. She published her first fictional work in 1863–1864 in the Southern Literary Messenger, which serialized her novel Agnes Graham, which featured a heroine modelled on herself. The romantic novel had a young woman fall in love with her cousin, whom she planned to marry until learning about their common blood line. The success of the serials prompted her aunt Catherine's Philadelphia publisher, Claxton, Remsen and Haffelfinger, to republish the work in book form after the Civil War.

Other fictional works by Dorsey include Lucia Dare (1867), with a heroine modelled on her own experiences in fleeing Louisiana for Texas during the war. Its descriptions were considered harrowing by contemporary readers. She also completed Athalie (1872), and Panola (1877).

In 1866, Dorsey published a biography of Henry Watkins Allen, the wartime governor of Louisiana. They had first met in 1859, when both the Dorseys and Allen were traveling in the Rhine River Valley in Europe. She also used her study as a way to evaluate the role of women in the southern male-dominated society. She admired Allen's work: "As a leader of wartime relief for the poor, an advocate of emancipation for slaves as reward for Confederate service, and other bold if not always welcomed innovations, Allen much deserved her praise." The highly regarded work is considered to be an important contribution to the Lost Cause legend of southern memory.

In 1873, the Dorseys moved to Beauvoir, a plantation near Mississippi City, now Biloxi.

=== Relationship with Jefferson Davis ===
Soon after her husband died in 1875, Dorsey learned that Jefferson Davis, the former president of the Confederacy, was ill and bankrupt. She invited him to visit at the plantation in December 1876. Davis had been married since 1845 to his second wife, Varina Howell Davis, but they had suffered difficulties (as a girl, Varina had also attended Madame Grelaud's French school).

Impoverished after his imprisonment, the Davises had been living with their eldest daughter and her family in Memphis, Tennessee. Davis moved into Beauvoir on a permanent basis, where Dorsey provided him with a cottage on the grounds for his use.

There, Davis began to write his memoir, The Rise and Fall of the Confederate Government. Dorsey was instrumental in his success, organizing his day, motivating him to work, taking dictation, transcribing notes, editing and offering advice. Rumors quickly began to fly that the two were having an illicit affair, and it was nearly "an open scandal," but they refused to yield to it. Varina Davis became enraged and refused for a long time to set foot on Dorsey's property. Eventually she accepted Dorsey's invitation to live there and moved into one of the guest cottages at Beauvoir.

=== Death ===
When the Davises' last surviving son Jefferson Davis, Jr. died in 1878, the loss devastated both his parents. Varina Davis warmed to Dorsey's hospitality. That summer, Sarah Dorsey nursed Varina through a long debilitating illness. Soon afterward, Sarah Dorsey learned that she had inoperable tumours in her breast. As her health declined, Varina Davis became her primary nurse.

Recognizing that she was dying, Dorsey rewrote her will in 1878. She bequeathed all her capital and Beauvoir, to Jefferson Davis. Dorsey died in the St. Charles Hotel in New Orleans on July 4, 1879, at the age of 50 after an unsuccessful operation for breast cancer performed by Dr. T. G. Richardson, assisted by Dr. Rudolph Matas. Davis was at her bedside when she died. The Dahlgren family sued but failed to break the will.

== Legacy ==
After Jefferson Davis' death in 1889, the Beauvoir plantation was adapted as a home for Confederate veterans until 1957, and many were buried after their deaths in the cemetery behind the house. After the last veteran died, the property was adapted as a house museum. The property is now home to the Jefferson Davis Presidential Library and Museum.

== Works ==
- Agnes Graham (1863–1864), serialized in the Southern Literary Messenger
- Biography of Henry Watkins Allen (1866), governor of Louisiana
- Lucia Dare (1867)
- Athalie (1872)
- Panola (1877)
