= Kate Lee Ferguson =

American writer

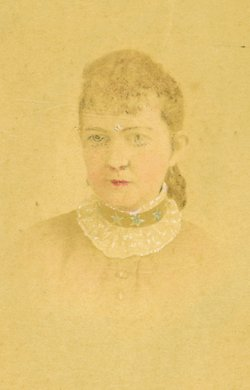
- Ferguson, c. 1862
- Born: Catherine Sarah Lee; November 3, 1841; Lexington, Kentucky, U.S.
- Died: May 30, 1928 (aged 86); Mississippi City, Mississippi, U.S.
- Resting place: Beauvoir Cemetery, Biloxi, Mississippi, U.S. 30°23′32.6″N 88°58′15.0″W
- Spouse: Samuel Wragg Ferguson (m. 1862; died 1917)
- Children: 4
- Relatives: Ellen Ware Lee (mother)
- Writing career
- Pen name: "Kate Lee Ferguson"
- Notable works: Cliquot; Little Mose

Catherine Sarah Ferguson (née Lee; November 3, 1841 – May 30, 1928), better known by her pen name "Kate Lee Ferguson," was an American novelist, poet, and composer best known as the author of Cliquot (1889) and Little Mose (1891).

== Biography ==
Catherine Sarah Lee was born on November 3, 1841, in Lexington, Kentucky, where she was educated, to William Henry and Ellen (née Ware) Lee. On August 28, 1862, she married Lieutenant-Colonel Samuel Wragg Ferguson of the 28th Mississippi Cavalry Regiment and accompanied him on his various campaigns.

She shocked all of her acquaintances by appearing in 1886 in an amateur production of "Sea of Ice", a then popular drama, "assuming the part of a young Indian maid, in very inadequate clothing – her kirtie only coming down to the knees on one side, and not that far on the other, with bare arms, bare bosom, bare legs, and big bracelets round her ankles."

Published in 1889, Cliquot is the story of Neil Emory, who owns an unpredictable and dangerous horse named Cliquot, whom he cannot find a rider for, as the horse has already killed several previous riders. A mysterious jockey appears who wins the owner a fortune and then turns out to be a beautiful woman named Gwendoline Gwinn, the horse's previous owner. The story is imbued with lust in the "bodice-ripping style", where "female bosoms heave with desire and heroes express their love in ways that an earlier generation would have found much too suggestive."

== Selected works ==
=== Novels ===
- Cliquot: A Racing Story of Ideal Beauty (1889)
- Little Mose (1891)

=== Short stories ===
- A Woman's Army Experience (1898)

== See also ==
- List of women writers
