= LeRoy Percy =

American politician (1860–1929)

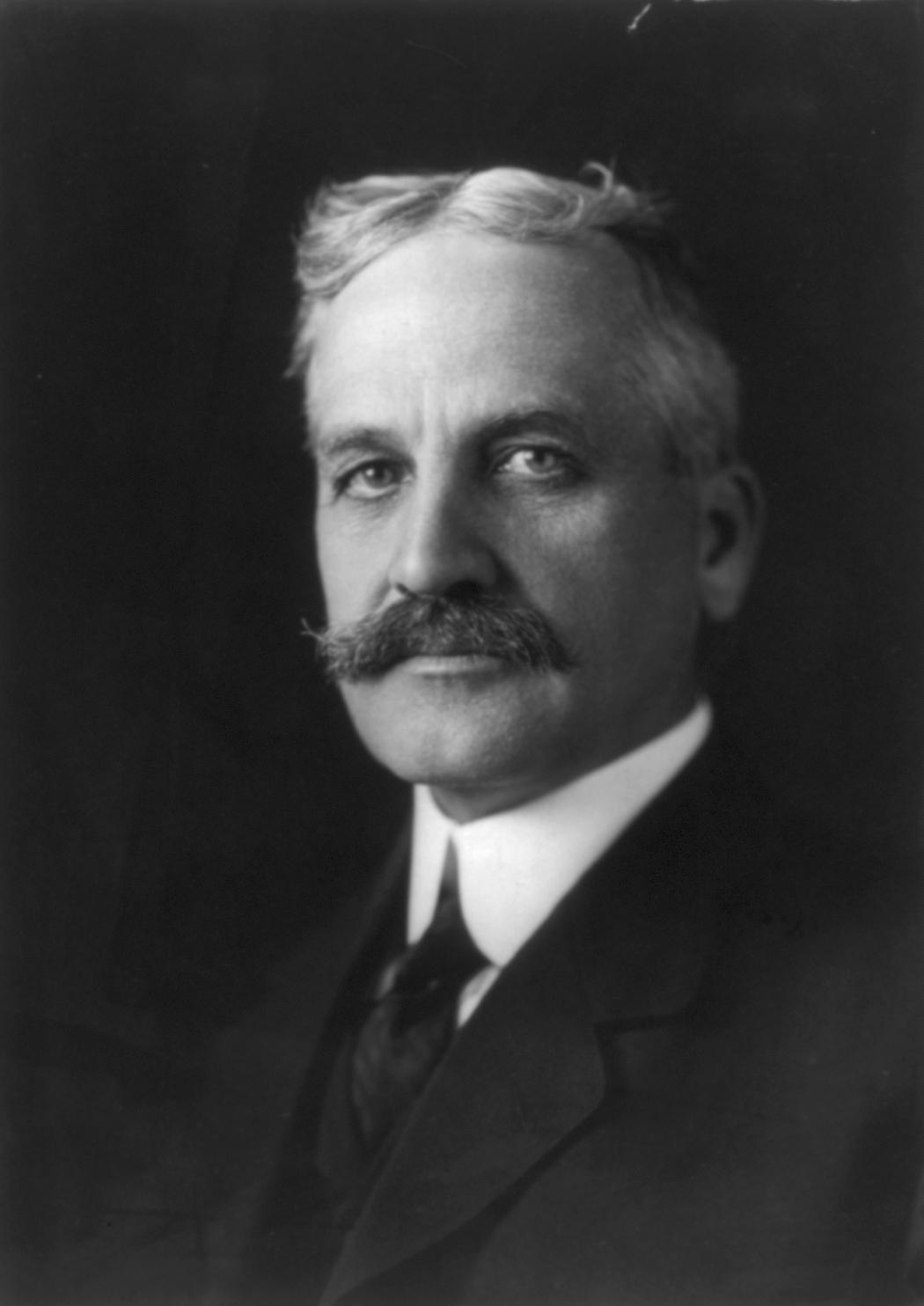
- Percy, c. 1910

United States Senator from Mississippi
- In office February 23, 1910 – March 3, 1913
- Preceded by: James Gordon
- Succeeded by: James K. Vardaman

Personal details
- Born: November 9, 1860 Greenville, Mississippi, U.S.
- Died: December 24, 1929 (aged 69) Memphis, Tennessee, U.S.
- Party: Democratic

LeRoy Percy (November 9, 1860 – December 24, 1929) was an American attorney, planter, and Democratic politician who served as a United States Senator from the state of Mississippi from 1910 to 1913.

Percy was a grandson of Charles "Don Carlos" Percy. He graduated from the University of the South at Sewanee in 1879, and the University of Virginia School of Law in 1881, where he was a member of the Chi Phi fraternity. He was admitted to the bar later that year and achieved wealth as an attorney. Often being paid in land, he became a major planter in Greenville, Mississippi, in the heart of the Mississippi Delta. His plantation of Trail Lake eventually covered 20,000 acres and was worked by black sharecroppers and Italian immigrants. He also leased land in Chicot County in the Arkansas Delta.

Percy's influence led him to become active in politics. He was elected by the state legislature to the U.S. Senate in 1910. In 1912, he was defeated in the first popular election of a U.S. Senator in the state, by the populist James K. Vardaman, a white supremacist, who attacked Percy for being relatively liberal on race issues and for being a member of the state's planter elite. Vardaman, also a Democrat, ran unopposed in the general election.

In 1922, Percy came to national notice by confronting Ku Klux Klan organizers in Greenville and uniting local people against them. During the Great Mississippi Flood of 1927, Percy appointed his son, William Alexander Percy, to direct the work of thousands of black laborers on the levees near Greenville.

== Planter ==
Percy became an attorney in Greenville, Mississippi, the county seat of Washington County, Mississippi, in the Mississippi Delta. In his early years, some clients paid in horses and others in land, and Percy acquired a total of 20,000 acres. His plantation, Trail Lake, was worked by Black sharecroppers, who provided most of the labor on all of the plantations in the area and had been the majority of the population in the county since before the American Civil War. Percy gave them a better share than many others by setting up schools on the property for the children and allowing his tenants to buy land. He worked to build a community on the plantation.

== Marriage and family ==
Soon after starting his law practice, Percy married Camille, a French Catholic woman. They had two sons, of whom only one survived to adulthood, William Alexander Percy (1885–1942).

William followed his father into law. He served with distinction in World War I and was best known for his memoir, Lanterns on the Levee: Recollections of a Planter's Son, but also published poetry. Never married, William Percy took in and adopted his cousin's three sons when they were orphaned as boys (after their father's suicide and their mother's death in a car accident). The boys included Walker Percy, who became a notable novelist and won the National Book Award for his first book, The Moviegoer.

== Peonage and Jim Crow ==
Percy also had interests in other plantations, such as by leasing Sunnyside Plantation in Chicot County, Arkansas, on the other side of the Mississippi River. Short on labor, the county recruited Italian immigrants in 1895 to work as sharecroppers. They found the conditions so unfavorable that most moved away to northwestern Arkansas. Others stayed but felt trapped by the sharecropper system of accounting, which seemed to be perpetual debt. They complained to their consulate.

In 1907, the Theodore Roosevelt administration had the US Department of Justice conduct an investigation of the plantation. Its investigator, Mary Grace Quackenbos, concluded the conditions constituted peonage, but Percy's influence with the state government and personal friendship with Roosevelt caused the report to be buried, and no action taken against the planter.

White Democrats had continued to work to suppress Black votes and reacted to prevent another biracial coalition with Republicans and Populists, as had occurred in the 1880s. In 1890, the white-dominated state legislature passed a new state constitution that included provisions that disenfranchised most blacks by such devices as poll taxes, literacy tests, and grandfather clauses. Black people did not regain the full ability to vote until after 1965, when the US Congress passed the Voting Rights Act.

== Senator ==
After the vacancy of the seat held by Senator James Gordon, the Mississippi legislature convened to fill it. A plurality of legislators (by then all white) then backed the white supremacist James K. Vardaman, but the fractured remainder sought to thwart his extreme racial policies. A majority united behind Percy to block Vardaman's appointment. In 1910, Percy became the last senator chosen by the Mississippi legislature. That was prior to the adoption of the Seventeenth Amendment to the US Constitution for the popular election of senators.

Percy held office until 1913. In 1912, he was challenged in the Democratic primary under the new system by the populist Vardaman. The campaign was managed by Theodore Bilbo, who emphasized class tensions and racial segregation. The tactics caused the defeat of Percy, who was attacked as a representative of the aristocracy of the state and for taking a progressive stance on race relations. He advocated education for Black people and worked to improve race relations by appealing to the planters' sense of noblesse oblige. The issue of disenfranchisement of Black people caused the Democratic primary to become the deciding competitive race for state and local offices in Mississippi.

== Later career ==
After his defeat, Percy retired from politics to run his model plantation at Trail Lake and to practice law for railroads and banks. British investors hired him to manage the largest cotton plantation in the country; he received 10% of the profits.

== Condemnation of Ku Klux Klan ==
In 1922, Percy rose to national prominence for confronting the Ku Klux Klan when it attempted to organize members in Washington County during the years of its revival in the South and growth in the Midwest. On March 1, 1922, the Klan planned a recruiting session at the Greenville courthouse. Percy arrived during a speech by the Klan leader Joseph G. Camp, who was attacking Black people, Jews, and Catholics. After Camp finished, Percy approached the podium and proceeded to dismantle Camp's speech to thunderous applause, concluding with this plea: "Friends, let this Klan go somewhere else where it will not do the harm that it will in this community. Let them sow dissension in some community less united than is ours." After Percy stepped down, an ally in the audience rose to put forth a resolution, secretly written by Percy, condemning the Klan. The resolution passed, and Camp ceased his efforts to establish the Klan in Washington County. Percy's speech and victory drew praise from newspapers around the nation.

== Battling Mississippi flood of 1927 ==
During the devastating Mississippi flood of 1927, which covered millions of acres of plantations and caused extensive damage, Delta residents began frantic efforts to protect their towns and lands. They used the many Black workers to raise the levees along the river by stacking sand bags on the top of the established levee walls. The former senator appointed his son, William Alexander Percy, to direct the work of the thousands of Black laborers on the levees near Greenville.

Percy kept the Black workers in the area isolated on top of levees when the levee was breached. In addition, they were forced to work without pay in unloading Red Cross relief supplies as the organization required work to be done by "volunteers." Both father and son would receive criticism for the forced labor.

Charles Williams, an employee of Percy on one of the largest cotton plantations in the Delta, set up camps on the levee that protected Greenville. He supplied the camps with field kitchens and tents for the many Black families to live while the men worked on the levee.

== Death and legacy ==
Percy died on Christmas Eve 1929 of a heart attack, at the age of 69. He was a member of The Boston Club of New Orleans.

LeRoy Percy State Park, a state park in Mississippi, is named after him.

== Bibliography ==
- Baker, Lewis. The Percys of Mississippi: Politics and Literature in the New South. LSU Press, 1983.
- Barry, John. Rising Tide. New York, Simon & Schuster, 1998.
- Kirwan, Albert Dennis. The Revolt of the Rednecks. P. Smith, 1964.
- Percy, William Alexander. Lanterns on the Levee: Recollections of a Planter’s Son. New York, Knopf, 1941. (Reprinted with new introduction by Walker Percy, LSU Press, 1973).
- Wyatt-Brown, Bertram. The House of Percy: Honor, Melancholy and Imagination in a Southern Family. New York and Oxford: Oxford University Press, 1994.

U.S. Senate
Preceded by James Gordon	U.S. senator (Class 2) from Mississippi; February 23, 1910 – March 3, 1913; Served alongside: Hernando Money, John Sharp Williams	Succeeded by James K. Vardaman
