= Battle of Rocky Face Ridge =

Battle of the American Civil War

- Part of the American Civil War
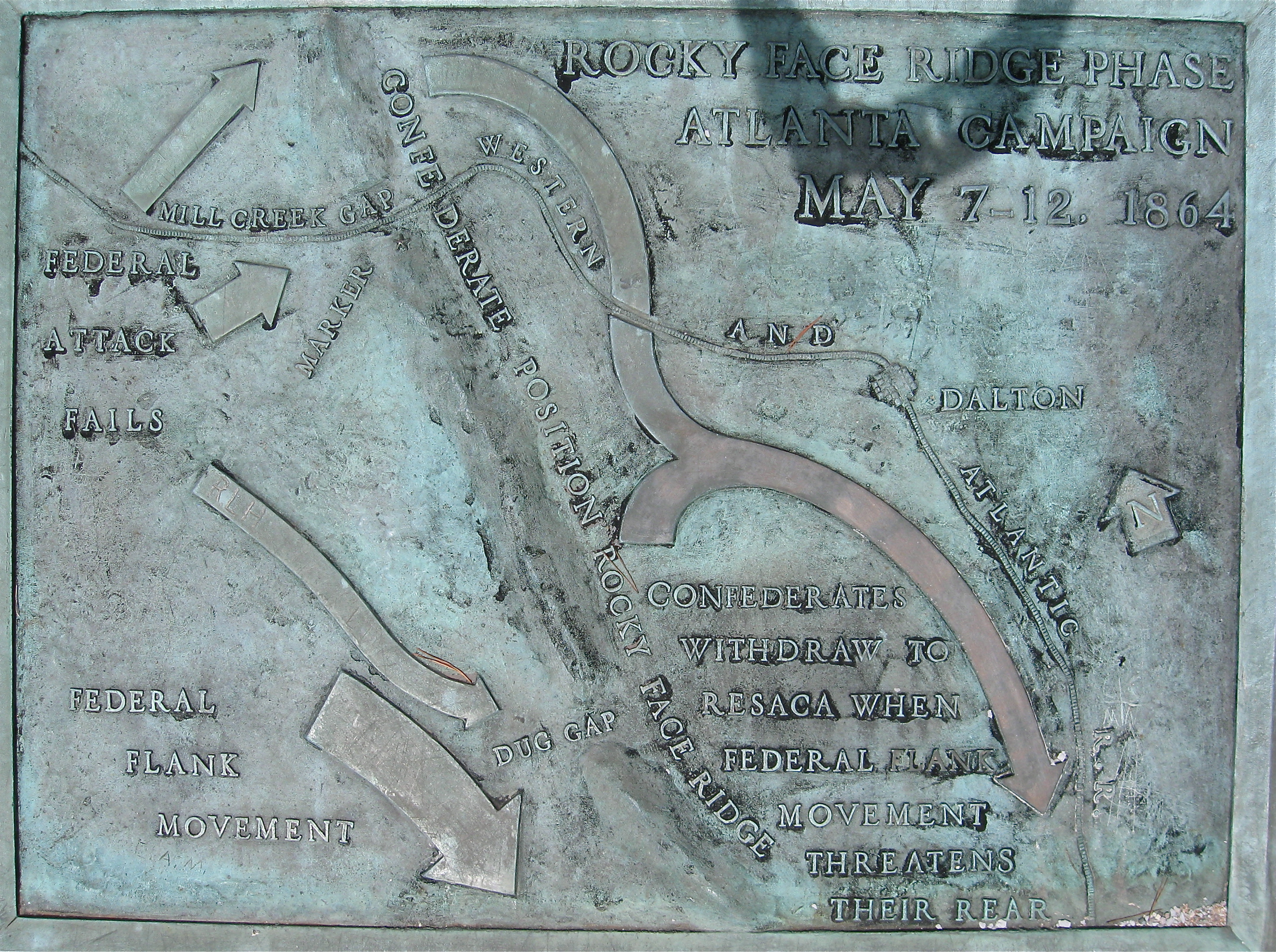
- Plaque memorializing action at Rocky Face Ridge
| Date | May 7, 1864–May 12, 1864 (6 days) |
| Location | Whitfield County, Georgia 34°44′28″N 85°00′56″W |
| Result | Union victory |

Belligerents
| United States | (Confederate States of America) Confederate States |

Commanders and leaders
| William T. Sherman | Joseph E. Johnston |

Units involved
| Military Division of the Mississippi | Army of Tennessee |

Casualties and losses
| 837 | 600 |

The Battle of Rocky Face Ridge was fought May 7–12, 1864, in Whitfield County, Georgia, during the Atlanta campaign of the American Civil War. The Union army was led by Maj. Gen. William Tecumseh Sherman and the Confederate army by Gen. Joseph E. Johnston. Confederates were forced to evacuate their strong position due to a Union flanking movement.

== Battle ==
General Johnston had entrenched his army on the long, steep Rocky Face Ridge and eastward across Crow Valley. When Sherman approached, he demonstrated against this position with two columns while he sent a third one through Snake Creek Gap, to the south, to hit the Western & Atlantic Railroad at Resaca. The first two columns engaged the enemy at Buzzard Roost (Mill Creek Gap) and at Dug Gap while the third column, under Maj. Gen. James B. McPherson, passed through Snake Creek Gap and on May 9 advanced to the outskirts of Resaca, where it found Confederates entrenched. Fearing the strength of the enemy, McPherson pulled his column back to Snake Creek Gap. On May 10, Sherman decided to join McPherson in an effort to take Resaca. The next morning, Sherman's army withdrew from in front of Rocky Face Ridge. Discovering Sherman's flanking movement along the Rocky Face Ridge, Johnston retired from the battle and moved south towards Resaca on May 12.

== Battlefield ==
In 2016, the American Battlefield Trust and its partners acquired, for purposes of preservation, 301 acres of the Rocky Face Ridge Battlefield, including surviving earthworks and the remains of a continuous entrenchment more than 2,000 feet long. That purchase expanded the total battlefield acreage acquired and preserved by the Trust and its partners to 926 acres.

== Gallery ==
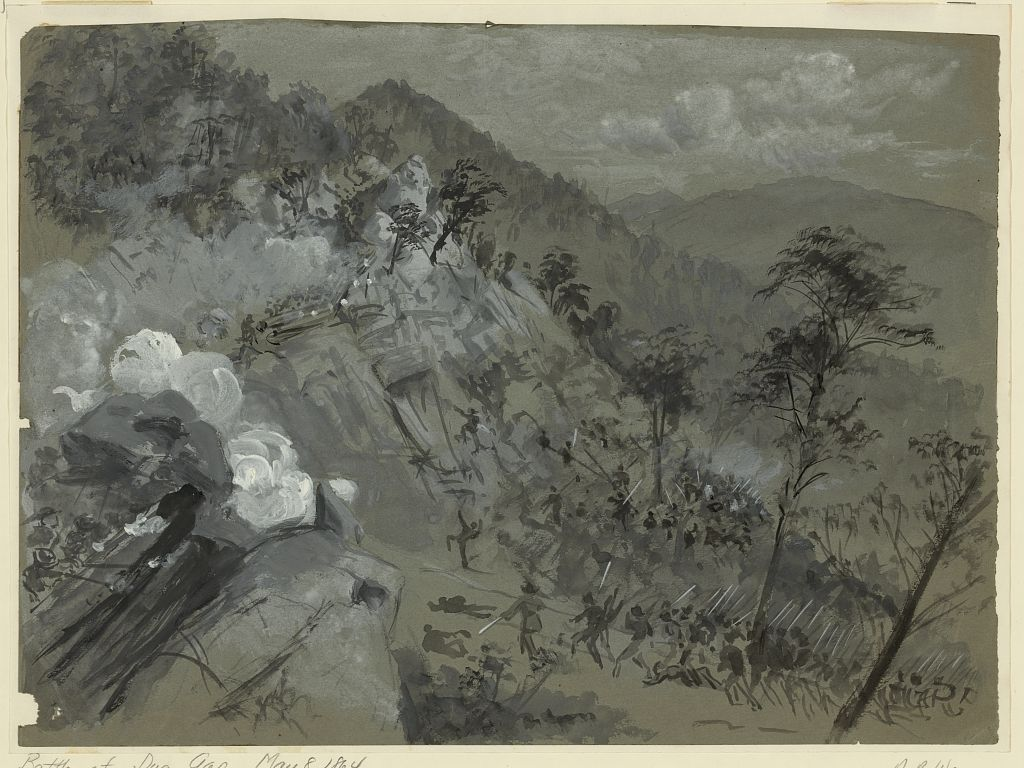
Assault on Dug Gap by Alfred Waud, 1864.

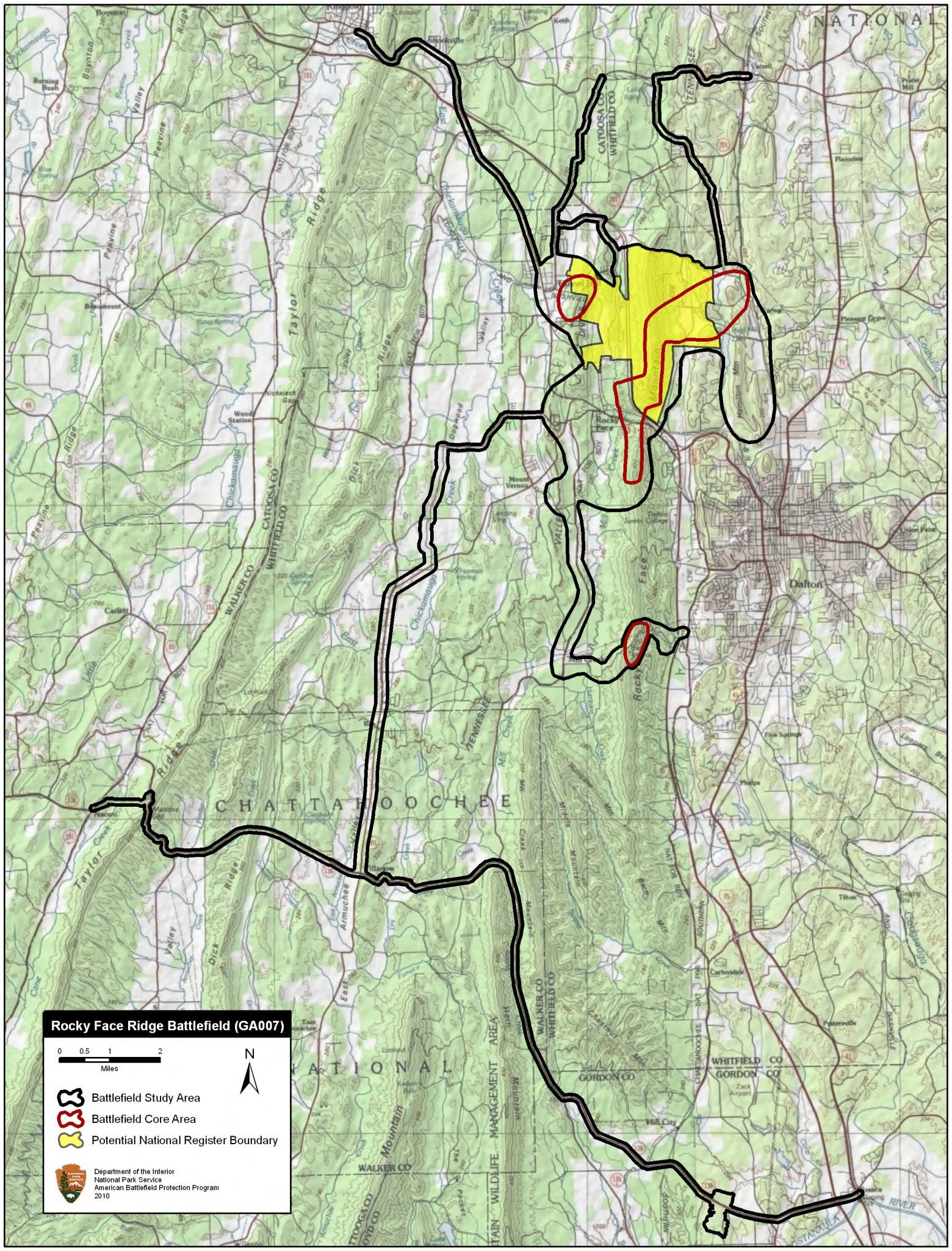
Map of battlefield core and study areas by the ABPP.

== See also ==
- Rocky Face, Georgia
- Drums in the Deep South, a movie loosely based on this battle
