= Siege of Savannah (1864) =

1864 siege of the American Civil War

- Part of the American Civil War
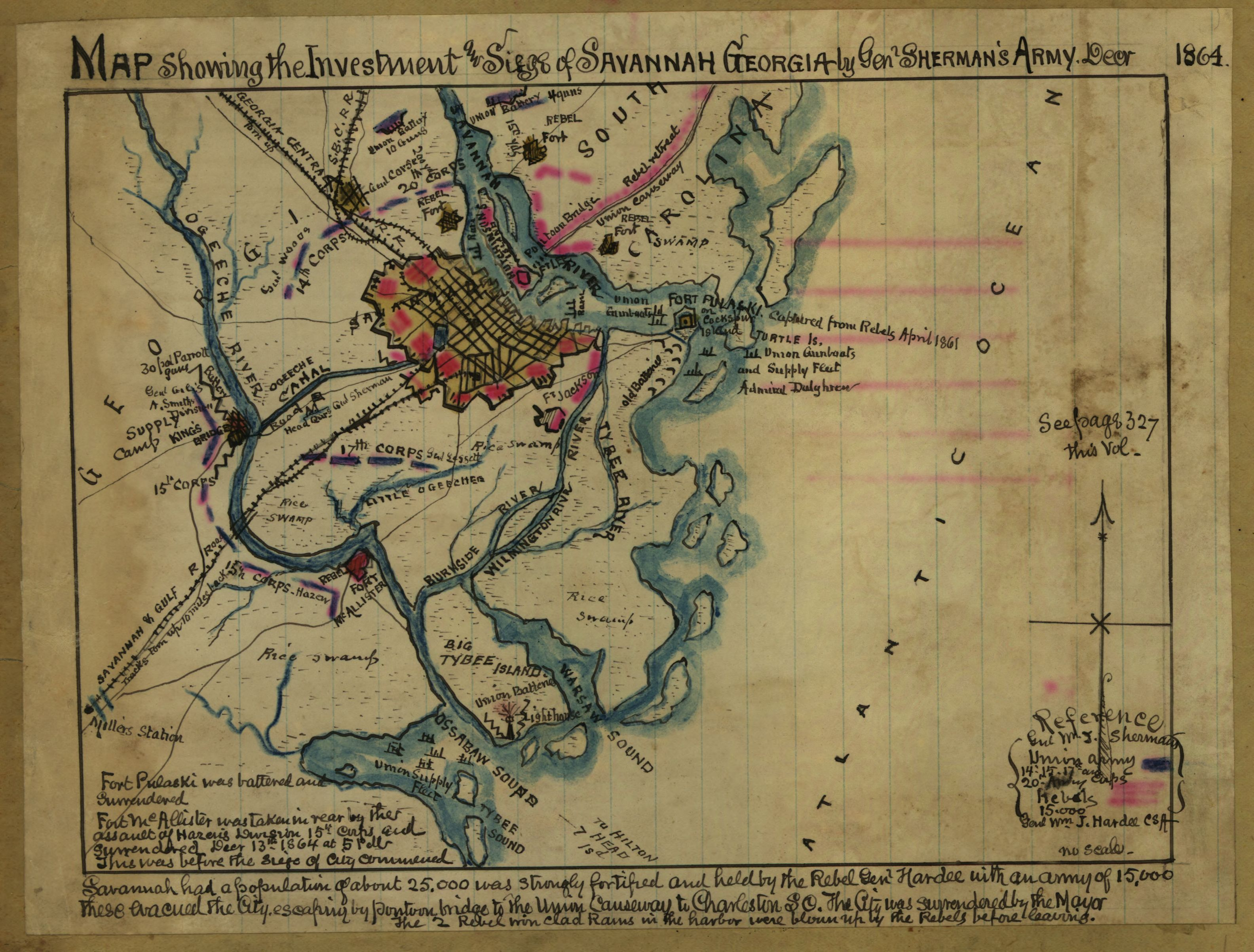
- Map showing the investment and siege of Savannah, Georgia by General Sherman's army, December 1864
- Operational scope: Strategic offensive
- Location: Bryan and Chatham counties, Georgia; 32°04′54.3″N 81°05′39.7″W
- Commanded by: (United States) Maj. Gen. William T. Sherman
- Objective: Capture of Savannah
- Date: December 9 – 21, 1864 (1 week and 5 days)
- Executed by: Army of Georgia and Army of the Tennessee
- Outcome: Union victory
- Location within Georgia

The siege of Savannah (December 9 – 21, 1864) occurred at the conclusion of the Savannah campaign, when Union armies under the command of Major-General William T. Sherman successfully besieged the Confederate city of Savannah during the American Civil War.

== Prelude ==
Arriving in eastern Georgia, Major-General William T. Sherman discovered that Confederate Lieutenant-General William J. Hardee held fortified Savannah with 15,000 men. A skillful Confederate defense at Honey Hill kept the railroad open to Charleston, South Carolina.

== The siege ==
On December 13th, Major-General William T. Sherman stormed Fort McAllister at the mouth of the Ogeechee River, 15 miles from Savannah. On the 16th, the Confederate forces were strengthened by the arrival of Brigadier-General Ferguson's brigade of dismounted cavalry. Then, establishing communications with the Union naval forces under the command of Rear-Admiral John A. Dahlgren, Sherman began an investment of the city. With his lines of communication about to be cut, Hardee evacuated Savannah on the night of the 20th of December, and Sherman moved in on December 21st, presenting the city in a shipborne and telegraph message as a "Christmas gift" to United States President Abraham Lincoln.
