= Battle of Ladiga =

1864 battle of the American Civil War

- Part of the American Civil War
Date	October 28, 1864 (161 years ago)
Location	Near Ladiga, Alabama 33°57′34″N 85°34′32″W
Result	Confederate victory

Belligerents
Confederate States	United States (Union)

Commanders and leaders
(Confederate States of America) Samuel W. Ferguson	(United States) Kenner Garrard

Units involved
Jackson's Cavalry Division	Second Division, Cavalry Corps, Military Division of the Mississippi

Casualties and losses
3 dead and 1 wounded	6 dead and 11 wounded or missing
- Location within Alabama

The Battle of Ladiga, also known as the Battle of Terrapin Creek, was fought on October 28, 1864, near Ladiga, Alabama, during the American Civil War. The last of the fighting between the armies of generals John B. Hood and William T. Sherman, it was here that Confederate Brigadier-General Samuel W. Ferguson turned back Brigadier-General Kenner Garrard's larger force. The two armies fought all summer from Chattanooga to Atlanta, then west to Ladiga. To split the South, Sherman turned and led Federal forces in the Savannah Campaign. Hood withdrew to reoccupy Tennessee, fighting the battles of Franklin and Nashville.

== See also ==
- List of American Civil War battles
- List of battles 1801–1900
- Troop engagements of the American Civil War, 1864
