= William Alexander Percy =

American poet

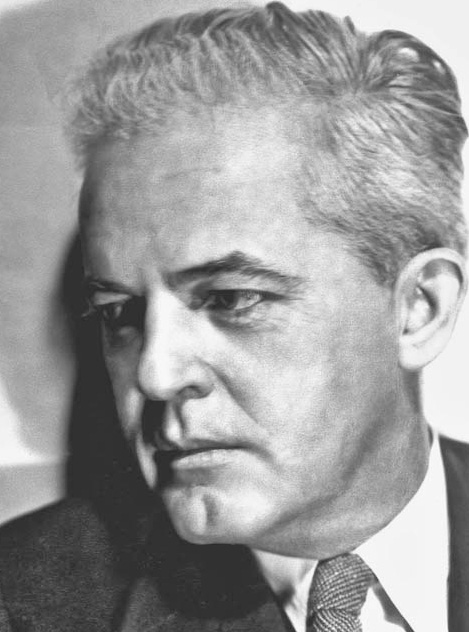
- Percy c. 1941
- Born: May 14, 1885; Greenville, Mississippi, U.S.
- Died: January 21, 1942 (aged 56)
- Education: The University of the South (B. A.); Harvard University (LLB)
- Parent(s): LeRoy Percy; Camille Percy

William Alexander Percy (May 14, 1885 – January 21, 1942) was a lawyer, planter, and poet from Greenville, Mississippi. His autobiography Lanterns on the Levee (Knopf 1941) became a bestseller. His father LeRoy Percy was the last United States Senator from Mississippi elected by the legislature. In a largely Protestant state, the younger Percy championed the Roman Catholicism of his French mother.

== Biography ==
He was born to Camille, a French Catholic, and LeRoy Percy, of the planter class in Mississippi, and grew up in Greenville. His father was elected as U.S. senator in 1910. As an attorney and planter with 20,000 acres under cultivation for cotton, he attended The University of the South in Sewanee, Tennessee, as did three previous generations in his family. He graduated in 1904.

He spent a year in Paris, then went to Harvard for a law degree. After returning to Greenville, Percy joined his father's firm in the practice of law. In 1915, he published his debut collection of poetry, Sappho in Levkas and Other Poems, with Yale University Press.

During World War I, Percy joined the Commission for Relief in Belgium in November 1916. He served in Belgium as a delegate until the withdrawal of American personnel upon the US declaration of war in April 1917. He served in the U.S. Army in World War I, earning the rank of Captain and the Croix de Guerre.

From 1925 to 1932, Percy edited the Yale Younger Poets series, the first of its kind in the country. He also published three further volumes of poetry with the Yale University Press. A Southern man of letters, Percy befriended many fellow writers, Southern, Northern and European, including William Faulkner. He socialized with Langston Hughes and other people in and about the Harlem Renaissance. Percy was a sort of godfather to the Fugitives at Vanderbilt, or Southern Agrarians, as John Crowe Ransom, Allen Tate and Robert Penn Warren often were called.

Percy's family was plagued with suicides, including that of his first cousin LeRoy Pratt Percy and possibly LeRoy's wife Martha Susan (Mattie Sue) Phinizy Percy, who died in a car accident. William adopted his cousin's children, Walker, LeRoy (Roy) and Billups Phinizy (Phin) Percy, after they were orphaned. As adults, all three prospered. Walker Percy became a medical doctor and a best-selling author. Roy married Sarah Hunt Farish, the daughter of Will Percy's law partner Hazlewood Power Farish. He took charge of Trail Lake, the Percy family's plantation. Phin married and moved to New Orleans to practice law.

Percy's most well-known work is his memoir Lanterns on the Levee: Recollections of a Planter's Son (Alfred A. Knopf, New York 1941). His other works include the text of "They Cast Their Nets in Galilee", which is included in the Episcopal Hymnal (1982) (Hymn 661), and the Collected Poems (Knopf 1943).

Percy wrote a one-act play, "In April Once", published with a collection of his poems in a volume also titled In April Once (1920). One of his poems, originally part of "In April Once", was re-published in a revised form under the name A. W. Percy in Men and Boys, an anonymous anthology of Uranian poetry (privately printed, New York, 1934). There is speculation that Edward M. Slocum, the compiler of the anthology, changed the text of the poem before printing it, and that it may have been included in the anthology without Percy's knowledge.

A friend of Herbert Hoover from the Belgium Relief Effort during the early years of World War I, Percy was put in charge of relief during the Great Mississippi Flood of 1927, when an area larger than all New England except Maine was flooded in the spring. During the flood, thousands of blacks, fleeing farms and plantations under water, were forced to seek refuge on the narrow rim of the levee in Greenville. Percy believed that the Black citizens of Greenville needed to be evacuated to Vicksburg to receive better care and food, and he arranged for ships to prepare to remove them. However, LeRoy Percy and local planters prevented the evacuation, and the Black citizens remaining on the levee were forced to work in conditions that many compared to slavery. The Colored Advisory Commission led by Robert Russa Moton, formed to investigate abuses that had taken place during the flood, named the Greenville camp as one where black refugees complained of poor treatment.

== Legacy and honors ==
- The William Alexander Percy Library at 341 Main Street, Greenville, Mississippi is named for him.
