= List of United States representatives in the 56th Congress =

This is a complete list of United States representatives during the 56th United States Congress listed by seniority.

As an historical article, the districts and party affiliations listed reflect those during the 56th Congress (March 4, 1899 – March 3, 1901). Seats and party affiliations on similar lists for other congresses will be different for certain members.

Seniority depends on the date on which members were sworn into office. Since many members are sworn in on the same day, subsequent ranking is based on previous congressional service of the individual and then by alphabetical order by the last name of the representative.

Committee chairmanship in the House is often associated with seniority. However, party leadership is typically not associated with seniority.

Note: The "*" indicates that the representative/delegate may have served one or more non-consecutive terms while in the House of Representatives of the United States Congress.

== U.S. House seniority list ==
U.S. House seniority
Rank	Representative	Party	District	Seniority date (Previous service, if any)	No.# of term(s)	Notes
1	Alfred C. Harmer	R	PA-05	March 4, 1877; Previous service, 1871–1875.	14th term*	Dean of the House; Died on March 6, 1900.
2	Thomas Brackett Reed	R	ME-01	March 4, 1877	12th term	Resigned on September 4, 1899.
3	Henry H. Bingham	R	PA-01	March 4, 1879	11th term	Dean of the House after Harmer died.
4	Robert R. Hitt	R	IL-09	December 4, 1882	10th term	
5	Charles A. Boutelle	R	ME-04	March 4, 1883	9th term	Resigned on March 3, 1901.
6	David B. Henderson	R	IA-03	March 4, 1883	9th term	Speaker of the House
7	John Mills Allen	D	MS-01	March 4, 1885	8th term	Left the House in 1901.
8	Thomas C. Catchings	D	MS-03	March 4, 1885	8th term	Left the House in 1901.
9	William W. Grout	R	VT-02	March 4, 1885; Previous service, 1881–1883.	9th term*	Left the House in 1901.
10	James D. Richardson	D	TN-05	March 4, 1885	8th term	
11	Joseph Wheeler	D	AL-08	March 4, 1885; Previous service, 1881–1882 and 1883.	10th term**	Resigned on April 20, 1900.
12	Albert J. Hopkins	R	IL-08	December 7, 1885	8th term	
13	Thomas Chipman McRae	D	AR-03	December 7, 1885	8th term	
14	John H. Bankhead	D	AL-06	March 4, 1887	7th term	
15	John Dalzell	R	PA-22	March 4, 1887	7th term	
16	Charles Addison Russell	R	CT-03	March 4, 1887	7th term	
17	Samuel Matthews Robertson	D	LA-06	December 5, 1887	7th term	
18	Marriott Henry Brosius	R	PA-10	March 4, 1889	6th term	
19	Jonathan P. Dolliver	R	IA-10	March 4, 1889	6th term	Resigned on August 22, 1900.
20	Rufus E. Lester	D	GA-01	March 4, 1889	6th term	
21	George W. Smith	R	IL-22	March 4, 1889	6th term	
22	Sereno E. Payne	R	NY-28	December 2, 1889; Previous service, 1883–1887.	8th term*	
23	Joseph Weldon Bailey	D	TX-05	March 4, 1891	5th term	Left the House in 1901.
24	Nicholas N. Cox	D	TN-07	March 4, 1891	5th term	Left the House in 1901.
25	David A. De Armond	D	MO-06	March 4, 1891	5th term	
26	John A. T. Hull	R	IA-07	March 4, 1891	5th term	
27	William Atkinson Jones	D	VA-01	March 4, 1891	5th term	
28	Leonidas F. Livingston	D	GA-05	March 4, 1891	5th term	
29	Eugene F. Loud	R	CA-05	March 4, 1891	5th term	
30	Adolph Meyer	D	LA-01	March 4, 1891	5th term	
31	H. Henry Powers	R	VT-01	March 4, 1891	5th term	Left the House in 1901.
32	George W. Ray	R	NY-26	March 4, 1891; Previous service, 1883–1885.	6th term*	
33	William L. Terry	D	AR-04	March 4, 1891	5th term	Left the House in 1901.
34	James Wolcott Wadsworth	R	NY-30	March 4, 1891; Previous service, 1881–1885.	7th term*	
35	Joseph W. Babcock	R	WI-03	March 4, 1893	4th term	
36	Albert S. Berry	D	KY-06	March 4, 1893	4th term	Left the House in 1901.
37	Richard Bartholdt	R	MO-10	March 4, 1893	4th term	
38	John Calhoun Bell	P	CO-02	March 4, 1893	4th term	
39	Joseph Gurney Cannon	R	IL-12	March 4, 1893; Previous service, 1873–1891.	13th term*	
40	Charles A. Chickering	R	NY-24	March 4, 1893	4th term	Died on February 13, 1900.
41	Henry Allen Cooper	R	WI-01	March 4, 1893	4th term	
42	Samuel B. Cooper	D	TX-02	March 4, 1893	4th term	
43	Robert G. Cousins	R	IA-05	March 4, 1893	4th term	
44	Charles Curtis	R	KS-01	March 4, 1893	4th term	
45	Hugh A. Dinsmore	D	AR-05	March 4, 1893	4th term	
46	Loren Fletcher	R	MN-05	March 4, 1893	4th term	
47	John J. Gardner	R	NJ-02	March 4, 1893	4th term	
48	Charles W. Gillet	R	NY-29	March 4, 1893	4th term	
49	Frederick H. Gillett	R	MA-02	March 4, 1893	4th term	
50	Charles H. Grosvenor	R	OH-11	March 4, 1893; Previous service, 1885–1891.	7th term*	
51	William Peters Hepburn	R	IA-08	March 4, 1893; Previous service, 1881–1887.	7th term*	
52	John F. Lacey	R	IA-06	March 4, 1893; Previous service, 1889–1891.	5th term*	
53	Asbury Latimer	D	SC-03	March 4, 1893	4th term	
54	Henry C. Loudenslager	R	NJ-01	March 4, 1893	4th term	
55	John W. Maddox	D	GA-07	March 4, 1893	4th term	
56	Thaddeus Maclay Mahon	R	PA-18	March 4, 1893	4th term	
57	Benjamin F. Marsh	R	IL-15	March 4, 1893; Previous service, 1877–1883.	7th term*	Left the House in 1901.
58	Samuel W. McCall	R	MA-08	March 4, 1893	4th term	
59	James McCleary	R	MN-02	March 4, 1893	4th term	
60	Philip D. McCulloch, Jr.	D	AR-01	March 4, 1893	4th term	
61	David Henry Mercer	R	NE-02	March 4, 1893	4th term	
62	Francis G. Newlands	D	NV	March 4, 1893	4th term	
63	James S. Sherman	R	NY-25	March 4, 1893; Previous service, 1887–1891.	6th term*	
64	Jesse F. Stallings	D	AL-02	March 4, 1893	4th term	Left the House in 1901.
65	Claude A. Swanson	D	VA-05	March 4, 1893	4th term	
66	W. Jasper Talbert	D	SC-02	March 4, 1893	4th term	
67	Farish Carter Tate	D	GA-09	March 4, 1893	4th term	
68	James Albertus Tawney	R	MN-01	March 4, 1893	4th term	
69	H. Clay Van Voorhis	R	OH-15	March 4, 1893	4th term	
70	Irving Price Wanger	R	PA-07	March 4, 1893	4th term	
71	John Sharp Williams	D	MS-05	March 4, 1893	4th term	
72	Robert Adams, Jr.	R	PA-02	December 19, 1893	4th term	
73	Galusha A. Grow	R	PA	February 26, 1894; Previous service, 1851–1863.	10th term*	
74	Jacob H. Bromwell	R	OH-02	December 3, 1894	4th term	
75	John Sebastian Little	D	AR-02	December 3, 1894	4th term	
76	Ernest F. Acheson	R	PA-24	March 4, 1895	3rd term	
77	William Benjamin Baker	R	MD-02	March 4, 1895	3rd term	Left the House in 1901.
78	John All Barham	R	CA-01	March 4, 1895	3rd term	Left the House in 1901.
79	Samuel S. Barney	R	WI-05	March 4, 1895	3rd term	
80	Charles Lafayette Bartlett	D	GA-06	March 4, 1895	3rd term	
81	Roswell P. Bishop	R	MI-09	March 4, 1895	3rd term	
82	Melville Bull	R	RI-01	March 4, 1895	3rd term	
83	Theodore E. Burton	R	OH-21	March 4, 1895; Previous service, 1889–1891.	4th term*	
84	John Blaisdell Corliss	R	MI-01	March 4, 1895	3rd term	
85	Rousseau Owen Crump	R	MI-10	March 4, 1895	3rd term	
86	Lorenzo Danford	R	OH-16	March 4, 1895; Previous service, 1873–1879.	6th term*	Died on June 19, 1899.
87	Alston G. Dayton	R	WV-02	March 4, 1895	3rd term	
88	Blackburn B. Dovener	R	WV-01	March 4, 1895	3rd term	
89	Frank Eddy	R	MN-07	March 4, 1895	3rd term	
90	George W. Faris	R	IN-05	March 4, 1895	3rd term	Left the House in 1901.
91	John F. Fitzgerald	D	MA-09	March 4, 1895	3rd term	Left the House in 1901.
92	George Edmund Foss	R	IL-07	March 4, 1895	3rd term	
93	Charles N. Fowler	R	NJ-08	March 4, 1895	3rd term	
94	Henry R. Gibson	R	TN-02	March 4, 1895	3rd term	
95	Joseph V. Graff	R	IL-14	March 4, 1895	3rd term	
96	Joel Heatwole	R	MN-03	March 4, 1895	3rd term	
97	James A. Hemenway	R	IN-01	March 4, 1895	3rd term	
98	E. Stevens Henry	R	CT-01	March 4, 1895	3rd term	
99	Ebenezer J. Hill	R	CT-04	March 4, 1895	3rd term	
100	Benjamin Franklin Howell	R	NJ-03	March 4, 1895	3rd term	
101	John J. Jenkins	R	WI-10	March 4, 1895	3rd term	
102	Charles Frederick Joy	R	MO-11	March 4, 1895; Previous service, 1893–1894.	4th term*	
103	Winfield S. Kerr	R	OH-14	March 4, 1895	3rd term	Left the House in 1901.
104	William Shadrach Knox	R	MA-05	March 4, 1895	3rd term	
105	Romulus Zachariah Linney	R	NC-08	March 4, 1895	3rd term	Left the House in 1901.
106	William Lorimer	R	IL-02	March 4, 1895	3rd term	Left the House in 1901.
107	George B. McClellan, Jr.	D	NY-12	March 4, 1895	3rd term	
108	Edward S. Minor	R	WI-08	March 4, 1895	3rd term	
109	Peter J. Otey	D	VA-06	March 4, 1895	3rd term	
110	Theobald Otjen	R	WI-04	March 4, 1895	3rd term	
111	Jesse Overstreet	R	IN-07	March 4, 1895	3rd term	
112	Richard W. Parker	R	NJ-06	March 4, 1895	3rd term	
113	Samuel Johnson Pugh	R	KY-09	March 4, 1895	3rd term	Left the House in 1901.
114	Walter Reeves	R	IL-11	March 4, 1895	3rd term	
115	John F. Shafroth	R	CO-01	March 4, 1895	3rd term	
116	William Alden Smith	R	MI-05	March 4, 1895	3rd term	
117	James H. Southard	R	OH-09	March 4, 1895	3rd term	
118	Stephen M. Sparkman	D	FL-01	March 4, 1895	3rd term	
119	Nehemiah D. Sperry	R	CT-02	March 4, 1895	3rd term	
120	George Washington Steele	R	IN-11	March 4, 1895; Previous service, 1881–1889.	7th term*	
121	Alexander Stewart	R	WI-09	March 4, 1895	3rd term	Left the House in 1901.
122	James F. Stewart	R	NJ-05	March 4, 1895	3rd term	
123	Cyrus A. Sulloway	R	NH-01	March 4, 1895	3rd term	
124	William Sulzer	D	NY-11	March 4, 1895	3rd term	
125	Robert Walker Tayler	R	OH-18	March 4, 1895	3rd term	
126	Vespasian Warner	R	IL-13	March 4, 1895	3rd term	
127	Stanyarne Wilson	D	SC-04	March 4, 1895	3rd term	Left the House in 1901.
128	Amos J. Cummings	D	NY-10	November 5, 1895; Previous service, 1887–1889 and 1889–1894.	7th term**	
129	William Henry Moody	R	MA-06	November 5, 1895	3rd term	
130	George W. Prince	R	IL-10	December 2, 1895	3rd term	
131	Rudolph Kleberg	D	TX-11	April 7, 1896	3rd term	
132	J. William Stokes	D	SC-07	November 3, 1896; Previous service, 1895–1896.	4th term*	
133	William C. Adamson	D	GA-04	March 4, 1897	2nd term	
134	De Alva S. Alexander	R	NY-33	March 4, 1897	2nd term	
135	Samuel T. Baird	D	LA-05	March 4, 1897	2nd term	Died on April 22, 1899.
136	Thomas Henry Ball	D	TX-01	March 4, 1897	2nd term	
137	Maecenas Eason Benton	D	MO-15	March 4, 1897	2nd term	
138	Richard P. Bland	D	MO-08	March 4, 1897; Previous service, 1873–1895.	13th term*	Died on June 15, 1899.
139	Thomas J. Bradley	D	NY-09	March 4, 1897	2nd term	Left the House in 1901.
140	William Gordon Brantley	D	GA-11	March 4, 1897	2nd term	
141	John Lewis Brenner	D	OH-03	March 4, 1897	2nd term	Left the House in 1901.
142	Willis Brewer	D	AL-05	March 4, 1897	2nd term	Left the House in 1901.
143	Robert F. Broussard	D	LA-03	March 4, 1897	2nd term	
144	Seth W. Brown	R	OH-06	March 4, 1897	2nd term	Left the House in 1901.
145	Walter Brownlow	R	TN-01	March 4, 1897	2nd term	
146	Stephen Brundidge, Jr.	D	AR-06	March 4, 1897	2nd term	
147	Robert E. Burke	D	TX-06	March 4, 1897	2nd term	
148	Thomas S. Butler	R	PA-06	March 4, 1897	2nd term	
149	Edward W. Carmack	D	TN-10	March 4, 1897	2nd term	Left the House in 1901.
150	Adin B. Capron	R	RI-02	March 4, 1897	2nd term	
151	Champ Clark	D	MO-09	March 4, 1897; Previous service, 1893–1895.	3rd term*	
152	Frank Gay Clarke	R	NH-02	March 4, 1897	2nd term	Died on January 9, 1901.
153	James H. Davidson	R	WI-06	March 4, 1897	2nd term	
154	Henry De Lamar Clayton, Jr.	D	AL-03	March 4, 1897	2nd term	
155	Charles F. Cochran	D	MO-04	March 4, 1897	2nd term	
156	Aaron Van Schaick Cochrane	R	NY-19	March 4, 1897	2nd term	Left the House in 1901.
157	William Connell	R	PA-11	March 4, 1897	2nd term	
158	James Cooney	D	MO-07	March 4, 1897	2nd term	
159	William S. Cowherd	D	MO-05	March 4, 1897	2nd term	
160	Edgar D. Crumpacker	R	IN-10	March 4, 1897	2nd term	
161	Samuel Arza Davenport	R	PA	March 4, 1897	2nd term	Left the House in 1901.
162	Robert C. Davey	D	LA-02	March 4, 1897; Previous service, 1893–1895.	3rd term*	
163	Robert Wyche Davis	D	FL-02	March 4, 1897	2nd term	
164	Reese C. De Graffenreid	D	TX-03	March 4, 1897	2nd term	
165	Marion De Vries	D	CA-02	March 4, 1897	2nd term	Resigned on August 20, 1900.
166	William Elliott	D	SC-01	March 4, 1897; Previous service, 1887–1890, 1891–1893 and 1895–1896.	6th term***	
167	Daniel Ermentrout	D	PA-09	March 4, 1897; Previous service, 1881–1889.	6th term*	Died on September 17, 1899.
168	Thomas Y. Fitzpatrick	D	KY-10	March 4, 1897	2nd term	Left the House in 1901.
169	William Henry Fleming	D	GA-10	March 4, 1897	2nd term	
170	Andrew F. Fox	D	MS-04	March 4, 1897	2nd term	
171	John W. Gaines	D	TN-06	March 4, 1897	2nd term	
172	William Laury Greene	P	NE-06	March 4, 1897	2nd term	Died on March 11, 1899.
173	James M. Griggs	D	GA-02	March 4, 1897	2nd term	
174	Edward L. Hamilton	R	MI-04	March 4, 1897	2nd term	
175	Robert B. Hawley	R	TX-10	March 4, 1897	2nd term	Left the House in 1901.
176	James Hay	D	VA-07	March 4, 1897	2nd term	
177	Patrick Henry	D	MS-07	March 4, 1897	2nd term	Left the House in 1901.
178	Robert Lee Henry	D	TX-07	March 4, 1897	2nd term	
179	William Marcellus Howard	D	GA-08	March 4, 1897	2nd term	
180	Thomas M. Jett	D	IL-18	March 4, 1897	2nd term	
181	John H. Ketcham	R	NY-18	March 4, 1897; Previous service, 1865–1873 and 1877–1893.	14th term**	
182	William Walton Kitchin	D	NC-05	March 4, 1897	2nd term	
183	John Lamb	D	VA-03	March 4, 1897	2nd term	
184	Charles B. Landis	R	IN-09	March 4, 1897	2nd term	
185	S. W. T. Lanham	D	TX-08	March 4, 1897; Previous service, 1883–1893.	7th term*	
186	John J. Lentz	D	OH-12	March 4, 1897	2nd term	Left the House in 1901.
187	Elijah B. Lewis	D	GA-03	March 4, 1897	2nd term	
188	Lucius Littauer	R	NY-22	March 4, 1897	2nd term	
189	William C. Lovering	R	MA-12	March 4, 1897	2nd term	
190	Archibald Lybrand	R	OH-08	March 4, 1897	2nd term	Left the House in 1901.
191	James R. Mann	R	IL-01	March 4, 1897	2nd term	
192	William McAleer	D	PA-03	March 4, 1897; Previous service, 1891–1895.	4th term*	Left the House in 1901.
193	John A. McDowell	D	OH-17	March 4, 1897	2nd term	Left the House in 1901.
194	David Meekison	D	OH-05	March 4, 1897	2nd term	Left the House in 1901.
195	William S. Mesick	R	MI-11	March 4, 1897	2nd term	Left the House in 1901.
196	Robert W. Miers	D	IN-02	March 4, 1897	2nd term	
197	John A. Moon	D	TN-03	March 4, 1897	2nd term	
198	Robert P. Morris	R	MN-06	March 4, 1897	2nd term	
199	Sydney Emanuel Mudd I	R	MD-05	March 4, 1897; Previous service, 1890–1891.	3rd term*	
200	James A. Norton	D	OH-13	March 4, 1897	2nd term	
201	Marlin Edgar Olmsted	R	PA-14	March 4, 1897	2nd term	
202	Horace Billings Packer	R	PA-16	March 4, 1897	2nd term	Left the House in 1901.
203	Charles Edward Pearce	R	MO-12	March 4, 1897	2nd term	Left the House in 1901.
204	Rice Alexander Pierce	D	TN-09	March 4, 1897; Previous service, 1883–1885 and 1889–1893.	5th term**	
205	John Stockdale Rhea	D	KY-03	March 4, 1897	2nd term	
206	Edwin R. Ridgely	P	KS-03	March 4, 1897	2nd term	Left the House in 1901.
207	John Franklin Rixey	D	VA-08	March 4, 1897	2nd term	
208	Edward Robb	D	MO-13	March 4, 1897	2nd term	
209	James M. Robinson	D	IN-12	March 4, 1897	2nd term	
210	Evan E. Settle	D	KY-07	March 4, 1897	2nd term	Died on November 16, 1899.
211	William B. Shattuc	R	OH-01	March 4, 1897	2nd term	
212	Carlos D. Shelden	R	MI-12	March 4, 1897	2nd term	
213	Thetus W. Sims	D	TN-08	March 4, 1897	2nd term	
214	James Luther Slayden	D	TX-12	March 4, 1897	2nd term	
215	David Highbaugh Smith	D	KY-04	March 4, 1897	2nd term	
216	Samuel William Smith	R	MI-06	March 4, 1897	2nd term	
217	Charles F. Sprague	R	MA-11	March 4, 1897	2nd term	Left the House in 1901.
218	William Ledyard Stark	P	NE-04	March 4, 1897	2nd term	
219	John Hall Stephens	D	TX-13	March 4, 1897	2nd term	
220	Frederick Stevens	R	MN-04	March 4, 1897	2nd term	
221	Roderick Dhu Sutherland	P	NE-05	March 4, 1897	2nd term	Left the House in 1901.
222	George W. Taylor	D	AL-01	March 4, 1897	2nd term	
223	Thomas H. Tongue	R	OR-01	March 4, 1897	2nd term	
224	Oscar Underwood	D	AL-09	March 4, 1897; Previous service, 1895–1896.	3rd term*	
225	Willard Duncan Vandiver	D	MO-14	March 4, 1897	2nd term	
226	Walter L. Weaver	R	OH-07	March 4, 1897	2nd term	Left the House in 1901.
227	George W. Weymouth	R	MA-04	March 4, 1897	2nd term	Left the House in 1901.
228	Charles K. Wheeler	D	KY-01	March 4, 1897	2nd term	
229	George Henry White	R	NC-02	March 4, 1897	2nd term	Left the House in 1901.
230	James R. Young	R	PA-04	March 4, 1897	2nd term	
231	William T. Zenor	D	IN-03	March 4, 1897	2nd term	
232	Joseph Baltzell Showalter	R	PA-25	April 20, 1897	2nd term	
233	James Tilghman Lloyd	D	MO-01	June 1, 1897	2nd term	
234	Edwin C. Burleigh	R	ME-03	June 21, 1897	2nd term	
235	George P. Lawrence	R	MA-01	November 2, 1897	2nd term	
236	Henry Sherman Boutell	R	IL-06	November 23, 1897	2nd term	
237	Edmund H. Driggs	D	NY-03	December 6, 1897	2nd term	Left the House in 1901.
238	Francis M. Griffith	D	IN-04	December 6, 1897	2nd term	
239	James Norton	D	SC-06	December 6, 1897	2nd term	Left the House in 1901.
240	William S. Greene	R	MA-13	May 31, 1898	2nd term	
241	Thomas Spight	D	MS-02	July 5, 1898	2nd term	
242	Charles W. F. Dick	R	OH-19	November 8, 1898	2nd term	
243	William Harrison Graham	R	PA-23	November 29, 1898	2nd term	
244	Frank A. McLain	D	MS-06	December 12, 1898	2nd term	
245	Henry Dixon Allen	D	KY-02	March 4, 1899	1st term	
246	John Wilbur Atwater	D	NC-04	March 4, 1899	1st term	Left the House in 1901.
247	Willis J. Bailey	R	KS	March 4, 1899	1st term	Left the House in 1901.
248	Laird Howard Barber	D	PA-08	March 4, 1899	1st term	Left the House in 1901.
249	John Dillard Bellamy	D	NC-06	March 4, 1899	1st term	
250	Vincent Boreing	R	KY-11	March 4, 1899	1st term	
251	Justin De Witt Bowersock	R	KS-02	March 4, 1899	1st term	
252	Phanor Breazeale	D	LA-04	March 4, 1899	1st term	
253	Abraham L. Brick	R	IN-13	March 4, 1899	1st term	
254	Charles H. Burke	R	SD	March 4, 1899	1st term	
255	Elmer Burkett	R	NE-01	March 4, 1899	1st term	
256	Albert S. Burleson	D	TX-09	March 4, 1899	1st term	
257	John L. Burnett	D	AL-07	March 4, 1899	1st term	
258	William A. Calderhead	R	KS-05	March 4, 1899; Previous service, 1895–1897.	2nd term*	
259	Ben F. Caldwell	D	IL-17	March 4, 1899	1st term	
260	Albert J. Campbell	D	MT	March 4, 1899	1st term	Left the House in 1901.
261	William A. Chanler	D	NY-14	March 4, 1899	1st term	Left the House in 1901.
262	Bertram Tracy Clayton	D	NY-04	March 4, 1899	1st term	Left the House in 1901.
263	William T. Crawford	D	NC-09	March 4, 1899; Previous service, 1891–1895.	3rd term*	Resigned on May 10, 1900.
264	George W. Cromer	R	IN-08	March 4, 1899	1st term	
265	Joseph B. Crowley	D	IL-19	March 4, 1899	1st term	
266	Thomas Cusack	D	IL-04	March 4, 1899	1st term	Left the House in 1901.
267	Francis W. Cushman	R	WA	March 4, 1899	1st term	
268	Herman Dahle	R	WI-02	March 4, 1899	1st term	
269	William Davis Daly	D	NJ-07	March 4, 1899	1st term	Died on July 31, 1900.
270	Stanley Woodward Davenport	D	PA-12	March 4, 1899	1st term	Left the House in 1901.
271	James William Denny	D	MD-04	March 4, 1899	1st term	Left the House in 1901.
272	John Dougherty	D	MO-03	March 4, 1899	1st term	
273	Michael E. Driscoll	R	NY-27	March 4, 1899	1st term	
274	Louis W. Emerson	R	NY-23	March 4, 1899	1st term	
275	Sidney Parham Epes	D	VA-04	March 4, 1899; Previous service, 1897–1898.	2nd term*	Died on March 3, 1900.
276	John J. Esch	R	WI-07	March 4, 1899	1st term	
277	David E. Finley	D	SC-05	March 4, 1899	1st term	
278	John J. Fitzgerald	D	NY-02	March 4, 1899	1st term	
279	Joseph W. Fordney	R	MI-08	March 4, 1899	1st term	
280	George Peter Foster	D	IL-03	March 4, 1899	1st term	
281	Romeo H. Freer	R	WV-04	March 4, 1899	1st term	Left the House in 1901.
282	Robert J. Gamble	R	SD	March 4, 1899; Previous service, 1895–1897.	2nd term*	Left the House in 1901.
283	Washington Gardner	R	MI-03	March 4, 1899	1st term	
284	Athelston Gaston	D	PA-26	March 4, 1899	1st term	Left the House in 1901.
285	George G. Gilbert	D	KY-08	March 4, 1899	1st term	
286	Martin H. Glynn	D	NY-20	March 4, 1899	1st term	Left the House in 1901.
287	Robert B. Gordon	D	OH-04	March 4, 1899	1st term	
288	James Knox Polk Hall	D	PA-28	March 4, 1899	1st term	
289	Gilbert N. Haugen	R	IA-04	March 4, 1899	1st term	
290	Thomas Hedge	R	IA-01	March 4, 1899	1st term	
291	John H. Hoffecker	R	DE	March 4, 1899	1st term	Died on June 16, 1900.
292	Summers Melville Jack	R	PA-21	March 4, 1899	1st term	
293	David Emmons Johnston	D	WV-03	March 4, 1899	1st term	Left the House in 1901.
294	Wesley Livsey Jones	R	WA	March 4, 1899	1st term	
295	Julius Kahn	R	CA-04	March 4, 1899	1st term	
296	Theodore F. Kluttz	D	NC-07	March 4, 1899	1st term	
297	Joseph R. Lane	R	IA-02	March 4, 1899	1st term	Left the House in 1901.
298	Jefferson Monroe Levy	D	NY-13	March 4, 1899	1st term	Left the House in 1901.
299	Chester I. Long	R	KS-07	March 4, 1899; Previous service, 1895–1897.	2nd term*	
300	Mitchell May	D	NY-06	March 4, 1899	1st term	Left the House in 1901.
301	Smith McPherson	R	IA-09	March 4, 1899	1st term	Resigned on June 6, 1900.
302	Victor H. Metcalf	R	CA-03	March 4, 1899	1st term	
303	James Monroe Miller	R	KS-04	March 4, 1899	1st term	
304	Franklin Wheeler Mondell	R	WY	March 4, 1899; Previous service, 1895–1897.	2nd term*	
305	Malcolm A. Moody	R	OR-02	March 4, 1899	1st term	
306	Stephen Morgan	R	OH-10	March 4, 1899	1st term	
307	Nicholas Muller	D	NY-07	March 4, 1899; Previous service, 1877–1881 and 1883–1887.	5th term**	
308	Henry F. Naphen	D	MA-10	March 4, 1899	1st term	
309	James C. Needham	R	CA-07	March 4, 1899	1st term	
310	Edward Thomas Noonan	D	IL-05	March 4, 1899	1st term	Left the House in 1901.
311	James M. E. O'Grady	R	NY-31	March 4, 1899	1st term	Left the House in 1901.
312	George Alexander Pearre	R	MD-06	March 4, 1899	1st term	
313	Fremont O. Phillips	R	OH-20	March 4, 1899	1st term	Left the House in 1901.
314	Rufus King Polk	D	PA-17	March 4, 1899	1st term	
315	Julian M. Quarles	D	VA-10	March 4, 1899	1st term	Left the House in 1901.
316	William Augustus Reeder	R	KS-06	March 4, 1899	1st term	
317	William Francis Rhea	D	VA-09	March 4, 1899	1st term	
318	Daniel J. Riordan	D	NY-08	March 4, 1899	1st term	Left the House in 1901.
319	Ernest W. Roberts	R	MA-07	March 4, 1899	1st term	
320	Gaston A. Robbins	D	AL-04	March 4, 1899; Previous service, 1893–1896.	3rd term*	Resigned on March 8, 1900.
321	John Seaton Robinson	D	NE-03	March 4, 1899	1st term	
322	William A. Rodenberg	R	IL-21	March 4, 1899	1st term	Left the House in 1901.
323	William W. Rucker	D	MO-02	March 4, 1899	1st term	
324	Jacob Ruppert	D	NY-15	March 4, 1899	1st term	
325	James Wilfrid Ryan	D	PA-13	March 4, 1899	1st term	Left the House in 1901.
326	William H. Ryan	D	NY-32	March 4, 1899	1st term	
327	Joshua S. Salmon	D	NJ-04	March 4, 1899	1st term	
328	Townsend Scudder	D	NY-01	March 4, 1899	1st term	Left the House in 1901.
329	John Levi Sheppard	D	TX-04	March 4, 1899	1st term	
330	Joseph C. Sibley	D	PA-27	March 4, 1899; Previous service, 1893–1895.	2nd term*	
331	John Humphrey Small	D	NC-01	March 4, 1899	1st term	
332	Henry C. Smith	R	MI-02	March 4, 1899	1st term	
333	John Walter Smith	D	MD-01	March 4, 1899	1st term	Resigned on January 12, 1900.
334	Charles Edward Snodgrass	D	TN-04	March 4, 1899	1st term	
335	Burleigh F. Spalding	R	ND	March 4, 1899	1st term	Left the House in 1901.
336	John Knox Stewart	R	NY-21	March 4, 1899	1st term	
337	John R. Thayer	D	MA-03	March 4, 1899	1st term	
338	Joseph Earlston Thropp	R	PA-20	March 4, 1899	1st term	Left the House in 1901.
339	Charles R. Thomas	D	NC-03	March 4, 1899	1st term	
340	Lot Thomas	R	IA-11	March 4, 1899	1st term	
341	Arthur S. Tompkins	R	NY-17	March 4, 1899	1st term	
342	Oscar Turner	D	KY-05	March 4, 1899	1st term	Left the House in 1901.
343	John Q. Underhill	D	NY-16	March 4, 1899	1st term	Left the House in 1901.
344	Frank Charles Wachter	R	MD-03	March 4, 1899	1st term	
345	Russell J. Waters	R	CA-06	March 4, 1899	1st term	Left the House in 1901.
346	James Eli Watson	R	IN-06	March 4, 1899; Previous service, 1895–1897.	2nd term*	
347	Edgar Weeks	R	MI-07	March 4, 1899	1st term	
348	James R. Williams	D	IL-20	March 4, 1899; Previous service, 1889–1895.	4th term*	
349	William E. Williams	D	IL-16	March 4, 1899	1st term	Left the House in 1901.
350	Edgar Wilson	SR	ID	March 4, 1899; Previous service, 1895–1897.	2nd term*	Left the House in 1901.
351	Frank E. Wilson	D	NY-05	March 4, 1899	1st term	Left the House in 1901.
352	Charles Frederick Wright	R	PA-15	March 4, 1899	1st term	
353	William Albin Young	D	VA-02	March 4, 1899; Previous service, 1897–1898.	2nd term*	Resigned on March 12, 1900.
354	Edward Danner Ziegler	D	PA-19	March 4, 1899	1st term	Left the House in 1901.
	Charles E. Littlefield	R	ME-02	June 19, 1899	1st term	
	Joseph E. Ransdell	D	LA-05	August 29, 1899	1st term	
	Dorsey W. Shackleford	D	MO-08	August 29, 1899	1st term	
	Amos L. Allen	R	ME-01	November 6, 1899	1st term	
	Henry D. Green	D	PA-09	November 7, 1899	1st term	
	Edward B. Vreeland	R	NY-34	November 7, 1899	1st term	
	Joseph J. Gill	R	OH-16	December 4, 1899	1st term	
	William Neville	P	NE-06	December 4, 1899	1st term	
	June Ward Gayle	D	KY-07	January 15, 1900	1st term	Left the House in 1901.
	William F. Aldrich	R	AL-04	March 8, 1900; Previous service, 1896–1897 and 1898–1899.	3rd term**	Left the House in 1901.
	Richard Alsop Wise	R	VA-02	March 12, 1900; Previous service, 1898–1899.	2nd term*	Died on December 21, 1900.
	William H. King	D	UT	April 2, 1900; Previous service, 1897–1899.	2nd term*	Left the House in 1901.
	Francis R. Lassiter	D	VA-04	April 19, 1900	1st term	
	Richmond Pearson	R	NC-09	May 10, 1900; Previous service, 1895–1899.	3rd term*	Left the House in 1901.
	William N. Richardson	D	AL-08	August 6, 1900	1st term	
	Walter O. Hoffecker	R	DE	November 6, 1900	1st term	Left the House in 1901.
	Edward de Veaux Morrell	R	PA-05	November 6, 1900	1st term	
	Josiah Kerr	R	MD-01	November 6, 1900	1st term	Left the House in 1901.
	Albert D. Shaw	R	NY-24	November 6, 1900	1st term	Died on February 10, 1901.
	Allan Langdon McDermott	D	NJ-07	December 3, 1900	1st term	
	Walter I. Smith	R	IA-09	December 3, 1900	1st term	
	Samuel D. Woods	R	CA-02	December 3, 1900	1st term	
	James Perry Conner	R	IA-10	December 4, 1900	1st term	

== Delegates ==
Rank	Delegate	Party	District	Seniority date (Previous service, if any)	No.# of term(s)	Notes
1	Dennis Thomas Flynn	R	OK	March 4, 1899; Previous service, 1893–1897.	3rd term*	
2	Pedro Perea	R	NM	March 4, 1899	1st term	
3	John Frank Wilson	D	AZ	March 4, 1899	1st term	
4	Robert William Wilcox	Ind	HI	November 6, 1900	1st term	

== See also ==
- 56th United States Congress
- List of United States congressional districts
- List of United States senators in the 56th Congress
