= Wisconsin Department of Workforce Development =

Wisconsin state government agency

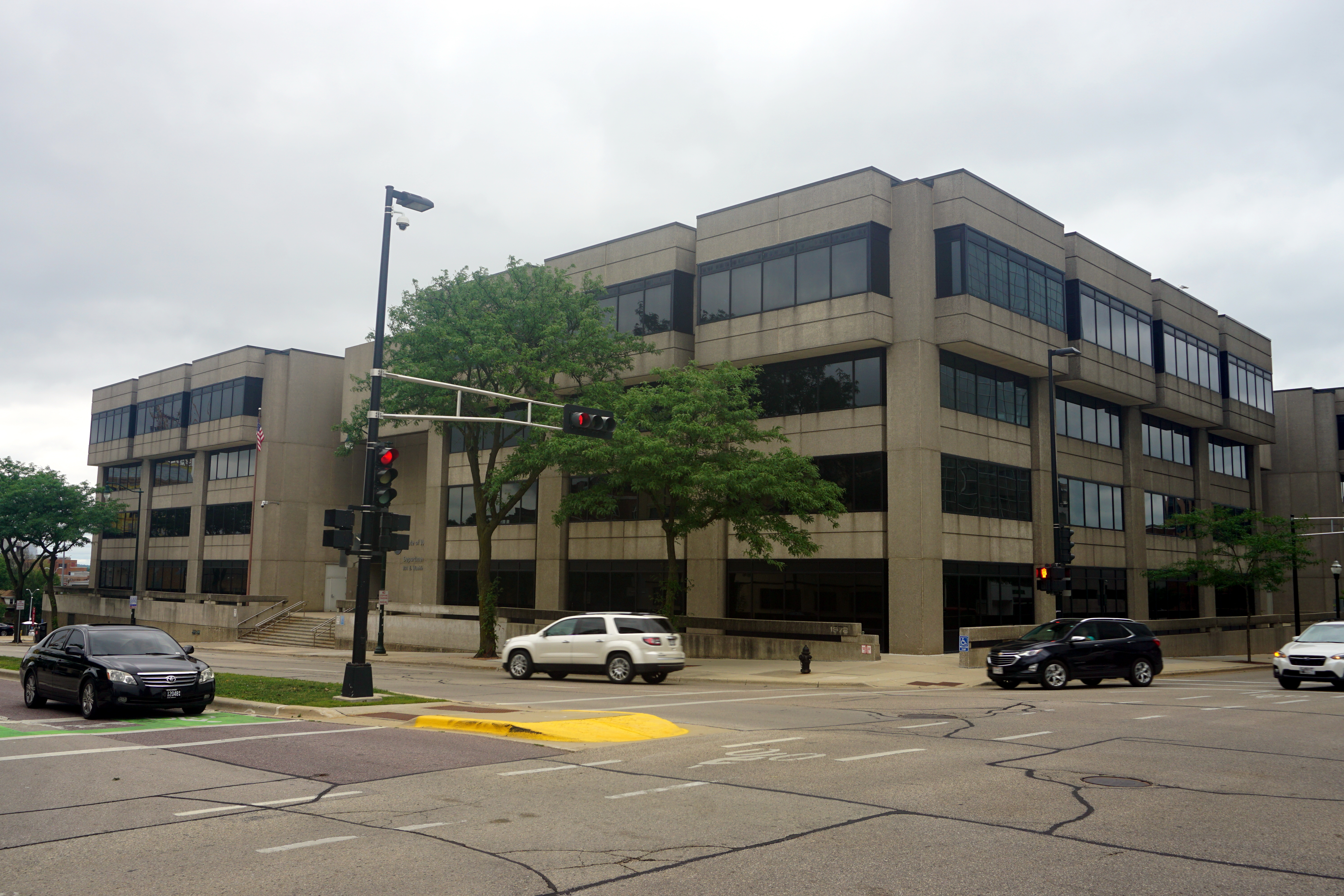
- State Labor Building

Agency overview
- Formed: July 1, 1996; 30 years ago
- Preceding agencies: Wisconsin Bureau of Labor Statistics (1883–1911); Wisconsin Industrial Commission (1911–1967); Wisconsin Department of Industry, Labor & Human Relations (1967–1996)
- Headquarters: State Labor Building (GEF 1) 201 E. Washington Ave. Madison, Wisconsin, U.S.; 43°4′33.6″N 89°22′51.852″W
- Employees: 1,606.05 (2021)
- Annual budget: $716,385,300 (2021)
- Agency executives: Amy Pechacek, Secretary; Pamela McGillivray, Deputy Secretary; Lee Sensenbrenner, Assistant Deputy Secretary
- Website: Agency website

The Wisconsin Department of Workforce Development (DWD) is an agency of the Wisconsin state government responsible for providing services to Wisconsin workers, employers, and job-seekers to meet Wisconsin's workforce needs. To effect its mission, the Department administers unemployment benefits and workers' compensation programs for the state of Wisconsin; ensures compliance with state laws on wages and discrimination; provides job resources, training, and employment assistance for job-seekers; and engages with employers to help them find and maintain adequate staffing for their businesses.

The Department is headquartered in the State Labor Building, or GEF-1, in downtown Madison, Wisconsin.

== History ==
In 1873, the Socialists of Milwaukee demanded that Wisconsin implement a new bureau to track industrial and labor statistics within the state. They pushed for this to be adopted into the platform of the Democratic Party of Wisconsin that year, but were not successful.

The idea re-emerged in 1881 and 1882, when attempts were made in the Wisconsin Legislature to pass legislation which would create such an agency. Finally, in 1883, Governor Jeremiah McLain Rusk, in his second annual message to the Legislature, endorsed the idea of a new state bureau to track industrial, agricultural, and labor statistics, saying, "The time has arrived when means should be provided for gathering accurate monthly crop and livestock reports during the growing season, and complete labor statistics, and their prompt circulation among the people. For this purpose I would recommend that you provide for a state bureau of agricultural and labor statistics." The idea was popular with farmers as well as industrial workers, and was enacted in part during that session with the passage of 1883 Wisconsin Act 319, an Act to Create a Bureau of Labor Statistics. Later that year, Rusk appointed Wisconsin's first Labor Commissioner, Frank A. Flower.

In 1884, the Bureau published its first report, with the results of safety-related questions such as: "What height are your buildings; are they wood, brick or stone? Have you fire escapes? What kind? Have you apparatus for extinguishing fires?" This was followed, in 1887, with Wisconsin's first industrial safety law, which required fences or guards around gears, shafts, bull-wheels, and pulleys, (1887 Wisc. Act 46) and, in 1889, legislation raised the minimum age of employment from 12 to 13 (1889 Wisc. Act 519).

In 1909, led by state senator Theodore W. Brazeau, the first attempt was made in the Legislature to pass workers' compensation. The legislation did not pass in this session, but a joint legislative committee was established to study the problem.

In 1911, the Wisconsin Bureau of Labor Statistics was replaced by the Wisconsin Industrial Commission. Governor Francis E. McGovern appointed Joseph D. Beck as the first head of the commission, with commissioners John R. Commons and Charles H. Crownhart. The new commissioners were instrumental in a series of new legislation regulating hours, wages, and employment conditions. They established free employment services in Milwaukee, Superior, La Crosse, and Oshkosh. They passed the nation's first modern apprenticeship law, incorporating area vocational schools, training 625 apprentices in the first year. One of the capstone achievements of this first Industrial Commission was the nation's first Workmen's Compensation Act in the state constitution, which guaranteed injury compensation as a legal right (1911 Wisc. Act 50). The constitutionality of the act was later upheld by the Wisconsin Supreme Court and the Supreme Court of the United States.

In 1913, Wisconsin passed one of the first minimum wage laws in the United States, requiring that a "living wage" must be paid to any employed woman or minor. A similar law in Oregon was challenged in the Supreme Court, but after it was allowed to go into effect, the Wisconsin Industrial Commission moved ahead with enforcing its living wage statute in 1919 with an initial living wage set at 22 cents.

In 1920, the commission hired Arthur J. Altmeyer as its chief statistician. In 1922, under Governor John J. Blaine, Altmeyer became the Secretary of the Industrial Commission; he would serve under the next four governors. Altmeyer, working with Governor Philip La Follette, achieved passage of the nation's first unemployment compensation law. In 1933, Altmeyer was enlisted by new U.S. President Franklin Roosevelt to work on the President's Committee on Economic Security, where he would eventually become the first Commissioner of the Social Security Administration. President Roosevelt would later refer to Altmeyer as the "Father" of Social Security.

Wisconsin issued its first unemployment compensation insurance August 17, 1936, to Neils N. Ruud for $15. Ruud sold the check to Paul Raushenush for $25 for its historical value. The check is now held by the Wisconsin Historical Society.

In 1937, Wisconsin created the Wisconsin Labor Relations Board, the predecessor to the current Wisconsin Employment Relations Commission.

In 1945, Wisconsin passed the Wisconsin Fair Employment Act (WFEA) (1945 Wisc. Act 490) and became one of the first three states to prohibit employment discrimination on the basis of race, religion, color, national origin, or ancestry. Additional protections were added to the statute over time:

- in 1959, protections were added for workers over age 40
- in 1961, for discrimination based on gender
- in 1965, Wisconsin was the first state to outlaw employment discrimination on the basis of handicap or disability
- in 1977, protections were added against discrimination absed on criminal record
- 1982 saw a prohibition on discrimination on the basis marital status, and saw Wisconsin become the first state to ban employment discrimination on the basis of sexual orientation
- and in 1987, protections were added for members of the armed forces

In 1945, the Apprenticeship Division of the Industrial Commission also became the state approval agency for veterans enrolling in training under the G.I. Bill.

In 1967, a state commission under William R. Kellett, which had been appointed by Governor Warren P. Knowles, recommended the consolidation of labor-related state government functions under a new agency known as the Department of Industry, Labor & Human Relations (DILHR).

Following the passage of Social Security amendments in 1967, Wisconsin became the first state in the country to establish Work Incentive (WIN) programs in every county. The Work Incentive program in Wisconsin was an important predecessor to the Wisconsin Works program of the 1990s, which became a model for other welfare-to-work programs in the U.S. and elsewhere.

The Occupational Safety and Health Act (OSHA), passed in 1970, allowed the DILHR to conclude their own job safety inspections for private industries. However the Department would continue to enforce occupational safety and health codes for public employees until 1982, as these jobs were not yet covered under OSHA.

In 1988, the Legislature enacted the Wisconsin Family and Medical Leave Act, five years before the federal version passed. That same year, the Wisconsin Job Service launched the Job Service Resume System, becoming the first state to link multiple states in a resume service. Additional states were eventually added to the program, and, eventually, it was adopted by the United States Department of Labor as America's Job Bank.

In 1994, Governor Tommy Thompson's Work First initiative attempts to divert more applicants from Aid to Families with Dependent Children (AFDC) to employment opportunities. AFDC was officially ended in Wisconsin in 1998 with the transition to Wisconsin Works (W-2). The Wisconsin Works program received an Innovations In American Government Award from the Ford Foundation in 1999.

Also in 1994, DILHR became one of the first state agencies to establish a presence on the internet, seeing it as a new avenue to provide job services, information, and assistance to the public. This was followed, in 1997, by the Business Resource Network, a website to help Wisconsin businesses find useful information. JobNet, a web-based system for matching applicants to employment opportunities began operation in 1996. Between 1995 and 1996, Wisconsin closed nearly all of its local unemployment offices and became the first state in the nation to implement a telephone-based claims system.

In 1996, the Department of Workforce Development replaced DILHR.

2015 saw the introduction of the new Job Center of Wisconsin (JCW) website and the online Re-employment Services portal, for unemployment insurance claims management.

== Organization ==
=== Leadership ===
The senior leadership of the Department consists of the Secretary, Deputy Secretary, and Assistant Deputy Secretary, along with the administrators heading up the divisions of the Department.

- Secretary: Amy Pechacek
- Deputy Secretary: Pamela McGillivray
- Assistant Deputy Secretary: Jennifer Sereno
- Employment and Training: Michele Carter
- Equal Rights: Ramona Natera
- Operations: Lynda Jarstad
- Unemployment Insurance: Jim Chiolino
- Vocational Rehabilitation: Meredith Dressel
- Worker's Compensation: John Dipko
- Chairman, Wisconsin Employment Relations Commission: James J. Daley

=== Divisions ===
==== Office of the Secretary ====
Subdivisions include:

- Office of Communications
- Office of Legal Counsel
- Legislative Liaison
- Office of Integrity & Accountability

==== Employment and Training ====
The Employment and Training Division works to produce and administer programs to help Wisconsin's workforce learn and train for jobs in demand, and help employers find and maintain the workforce they need. Services are provided through the Wisconsin Job Center website and a network of public-private partnerships and job centers.

Subdivisions include:

- Bureau of Workforce Information & Technical Support
- Bureau of Apprenticeship Standards
- Bureau of Workforce Training
- Bureau of Job Service
- Office of Veteran Employment Services
- Office of Skills Development
- Office of IT Coordination
- Office of Special Initiatives

==== Equal Rights ====
The Equal Rights Division administers the state's laws prohibiting discrimination in employment, housing, and public accommodations, manages the state's family and medical leave law, and enforces laws on minimum wages, overtime pay, timely payment of wages, employment of minors, and notifications of business closings or mass layoffs. This division also sets the state's prevailing wage, which must be paid for all state or municipal construction projects.

Subdivisions include:

- Office of Support Services
- IS Comprehensive Services
- Bureau of Hearings & Mediation
- Budget and Policy
- Bureau of Investigations

==== Operations ====
The Operations Division provides administrative support for the program divisions.

Subdivisions include:

- Bureau of Enterprise Solutions
- Bureau of Finance
- Bureau of General Services
- Office of Policy and Budget
- Bureau of Procurement & Information Management
- Chief Information Officer & Bureau of Information Technology Services

==== Unemployment Insurance ====
The Unemployment Insurance Division collects payroll taxes from employers and facilitates proper distribution of benefits to unemployment claimants. This includes adjudicating disputes, detecting fraud, collecting benefit overpayments, and administering the state's New Hire Reporting program.

Subdivisions include:

- Quality Control
- Bureau of Tax & Accounting
- Bureau of Legal Affairs
- Benefit Operations Bureau
- Bureau of Management & Information Services

==== Vocational Rehabilitation ====
The Vocational Rehabilitation Division works with employees, employers, and program partners to facilitate employment for people with disabilities as part of a federally funded program.

Subdivisions include:

- Bureau of Consumer Services
- Bureau of Management Services

==== Worker's Compensation ====
The Worker's Compensation Division ensures that private insurers and self-insured employers properly compensate workers with work-related injuries or illnesses, and adjudicates appeals arising from those claims.

Subdivisions include:

- Administrative Services Section
- Bureau of Claims Management
- Bureau of Insurance Programs
- Bureau of Legal Services

==== Wisconsin Employment Relations Commission ====
The Wisconsin Employment Relations Commission is a separate state commission administratively attached to the Department of Workforce Development. It is tasked with administering labor-employer relations in order to avoid strikes, lockouts, or other interruptions to commerce. They conduct labor elections, mediate collective bargaining disputes, and provide arbitration when grievances arise. The commission also provides training to facilitate the parties working together to achieve their common goals.

=== Statutory Commissions ===
Separate from the ordinary organizational structure of the Department, there are a number of specific commissions created by acts of the Wisconsin Legislature to oversee, advise, or administer certain functions.

- Wisconsin Apprenticeship Advisory Council
- Council on Migrant Labor
- Self-insurers Council
- Unemployment Insurance Advisory Council
- Worker's Compensation Advisory Council
- Health Care Provider Advisory Committee

=== Special Committees ===
By executive order, the governor of Wisconsin will from time-to-time appoint special committees to study a particular issue and advise the state. There are a number of such committees currently working under the umbrella of the Department of Workforce Development:

- Joint Enforcement Task Force on Payroll Fraud and Worker Misclassification
- State Rehabilitation Council
- Governor's Council on Workforce Investment

== Secretaries and Commissioners ==
=== Commissioners (Bureau) ===
Order	Commissioner	Took office	Left office	Governor
1	Frank A. Flower	1883	1889	Jeremiah M. Rusk
2	Henry M. Stark	1889	1891	William D. Hoard
3	Jeremiah Dobbs	1891	1895	George Wilbur Peck
4	Halford Erickson	1895	1905	William H. Upham
5	Joseph D. Beck	1905	1911	Robert M. La Follette

=== Commissioners (Industrial Commission) ===
Commissioner	Took office	Left office	Governor
Joseph D. Beck	1911	1917	Francis E. McGovern
Charles H. Crownhart	1911	1915	Francis E. McGovern
John R. Commons	1911	1913	Francis E. McGovern
Fred M. Wilcox	1913	1933	Francis E. McGovern
George Hambrecht	1915	1921	Emanuel L. Philipp
Thomas F. Konop	1917	1921	Emanuel L. Philipp
Arthur J. Altmeyer	1922	1933	John J. Blaine
R. G. Knutson	1921	1933	John J. Blaine
L. A. Tarrell	1921	1927	John J. Blaine
Voyta Wrabetz	1927	1955	John J. Blaine
Mable Griswold	1938	1939	Philip La Follette
Harry J. Burczyk	1939	1953	Julius P. Heil
C. L. Miller	1939	1952	Julius P. Heil
Arthur Enright	1953	1959	Walter J. Kohler Jr.
John H. Rouse	1955	1961	Walter J. Kohler Jr.
Mathlas F. Schlmenz	1959	1965	Gaylord Nelson
Gene A. Rowland	1965	1967	Warren P. Knowles
Joseph C. Fagen	1965	1970	Warren P. Knowles
Edward E. Estkowski	1966	1971	Warren P. Knowles
Charles B. Arnold	1968	1969	Warren P. Knowles
Joseph R. Kautzer	1969	1972	Warren P. Knowles
Phillip W. Lerman	1971	1975	Patrick Lucey
John C. Zinos	1971	1977	Patrick Lucey
Virginia Hart	1975	1977	Patrick Lucey

=== Secretaries (Industry, Labor & Human Relations) ===
Order	Secretary	Took office	Left office	Governor
1	Zell S. Rice	1977	1979	Martin J. Schreiber
2	Joseph N. Noll	1979	1981	Lee S. Dreyfus
3	Lowell B. Jackson	1981	1982	Lee S. Dreyfus
4	James J. Gosling	1982	1983	Lee S. Dreyfus
5	Howard Bellman	1983	1987	Tony Earl
6	John T. Coughlin	1987	1989	Tommy Thompson
7	Gerald Whitburn	1989	1991	Tommy Thompson
8	Carol Skornicka	1991	1996	Tommy Thompson

=== Secretaries (Workforce Development) ===
Order	Secretary	Took office	Left office	Governor
1	Linda Stewart	1997	2000	Tommy Thompson
2	Jennifer Reinert	2000	2003	Tommy Thompson
2	Jennifer Reinert	2000	2003	Scott McCallum
3	Roberta Gassman	2003	2011	Jim Doyle
4	Reggie Newson	2011	2016	Scott Walker
5	Ray Allen	2016	2019	Scott Walker
6	Caleb Frostman	2019	2020	Tony Evers
7	Amy Pechacek	2020	Current	Tony Evers

== See also ==
- United States Department of Labor
- Social Security Administration
- Personal Responsibility and Work Opportunity Act
- BadgerCare
