= Frank Flowers =

Frank Flowers may refer to:

- Frank E. Flowers, Caymanian filmmaker
- SS Frank Flowers, a Liberty ship

== See also ==
- Frank A. Flower, American newspaper editor
