= Hambrecht =

Hambrecht is a surname. Notable people with the surname include:

- Bill Hambrecht (born 1935), American investment banker
- George Hambrecht (1871–1943), American politician
