= Madison College (Mississippi) =

Madison College was a small college for men, founded in 1851 in Sharon, Mississippi. It ceased operations for financial reasons in 1872.

The establishment of the college was proposed 1850 in a speech given at Sharon Female College by Thomas C. Thornton, then president of the nearby Brandon College in Brandon, Mississippi. He offered to transfer the charter and assets of Brandon College to the town of Sharon on the condition that a building for the new school, to be named Madison College, be provided. Thornton was the first president, as well as "professor of moral and intellectual science and sacred literature." Madison College offered the following degrees: A. B., A. M., D. D., and LL D.

The faculty for the 1852-1853 academic year included T.C. Thornton (President and Professor of Languages, Moral Science and Intellectual Science), Rev. J.M. Pugh (Professor of Mathematics, Natural Philosophy and Astronomy), W. Pierce (Professor of English Literature and Assistant Professor of Languages), and Mr. William J. Smith (Principal of the Preparatory Department). W.L.C Hunnicutt (Professor of Ancient and Modern Languages, Comparative Anatomy and Hygiene) and B.F. Comfort (Principal of the Preparatory Department) were among the faculty during the 1857-1858 academic year. John S. Robinson, formerly of Adams County, Pennsylvania, was appointed as professor of mathematics, natural philosophy, and astronomy in 1860. The college later suspended operations during the civil war. It reopened after the war but closed in 1872, "perishing for want of endowment and patronage."

== Notable faculty and alumni ==
- Patrick Henry — U. S. Congressman.
