= Cynthia, Mississippi =

- Unincorporated community
- Location within Mississippi Location within the United States
- Coordinates: 32°24′11″N 90°14′56″W
- Country: United States
- State: Mississippi
- County: Hinds
- Elevation: 325 ft (99 m)
- Time zone: UTC-6 (Central (CST))
  - Summer (DST): UTC-5 (CDT)
- Area codes: 601 & 769
- GNIS feature ID: 691795

Cynthia is an unincorporated community in Hinds County, Mississippi, United States. It is part of the Jackson Metropolitan Statistical Area.

== History ==
Cynthia is located on the Canadian National Railway. A post office operated under the name Cynthia from 1887 to 1935.

Multiple fossils from the Eocene epoch have been discovered in clay pits in Cynthia, including a previously unknown species of Belosaepiidae (Mississaepia mississippiensis) and a species of Pterosphenus.

== Notable person ==
- Patrick Henry, member of the United States House of Representatives from Mississippi's 7th district
