= Joseph D. Beck =

American politician (1866–1936)

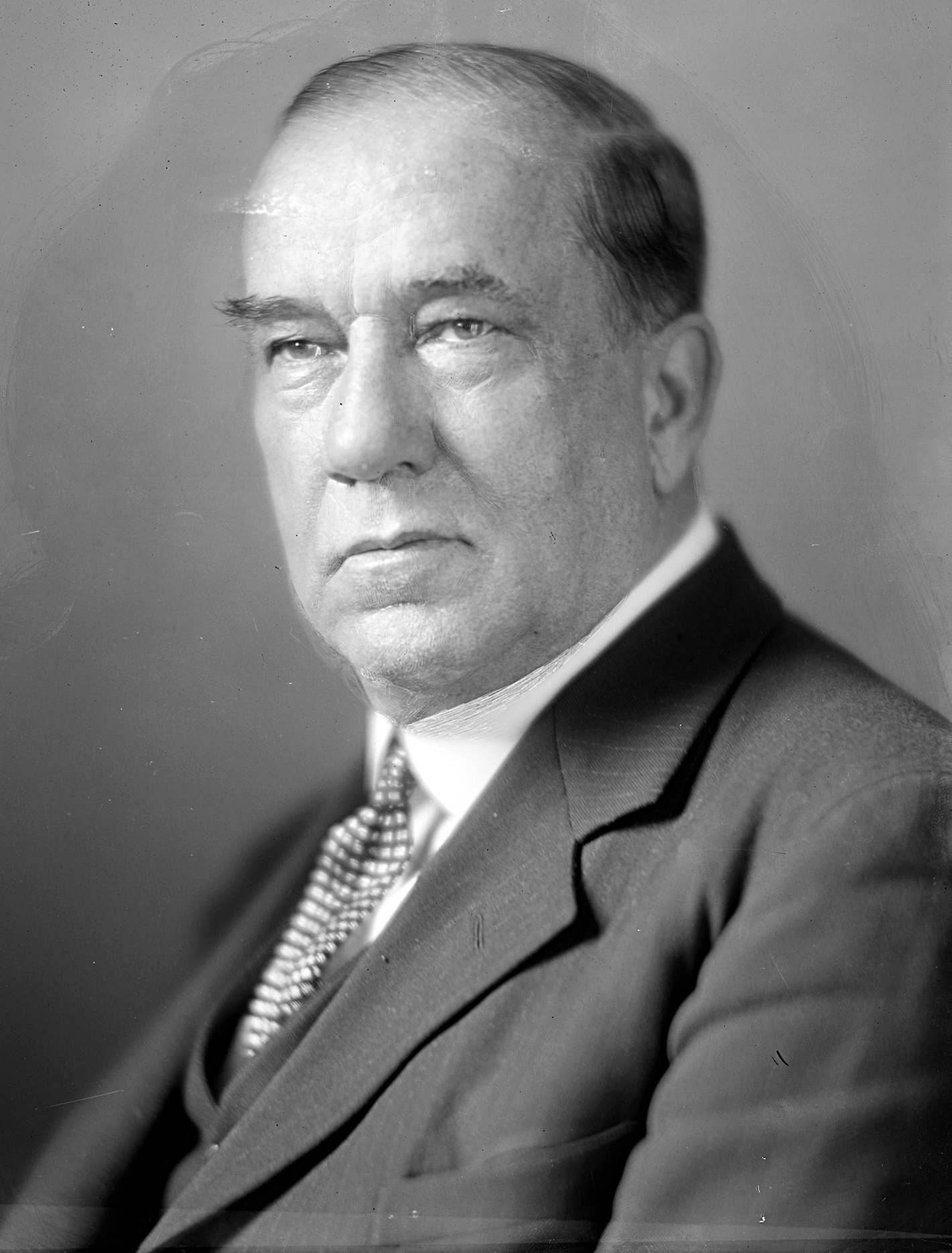

Member of the U.S. House of Representatives from Wisconsin's 7th district
- In office March 4, 1921 – March 3, 1929
- Preceded by: John J. Esch
- Succeeded by: Merlin Hull

Chairman of the Wisconsin Industrial Commission
- In office September 1915 – July 1917
- Preceded by: Charles H. Crownhart
- Succeeded by: George Hambrecht

5th Commissioner of the Wisconsin Bureau of Labor Statistics
- In office June 1905 – July 1, 1911
- Appointed by: Robert M. La Follette
- Preceded by: Halford Erickson
- Succeeded by: Position abolished

Personal details
- Born: March 14, 1866 Webster, Vernon County, Wisconsin, U.S.
- Died: November 8, 1936 (aged 70) Madison, Wisconsin, U.S.
- Resting place: Viroqua Cemetery, Viroqua, Wisconsin
- Party: Republican
- Spouse: Sarah Jane Peavy (m. 1888–1936)
- Children: Lori Alexander Beck^{(b. 1890; died 1893)}; Maud Ethel Beck^{(b. 1891; died 1891)}
- Education: Stevens Point Normal School; University of Wisconsin
- Occupation: Farmer, politician

Joseph David Beck (March 14, 1866 – November 8, 1936) was an American farmer, labor reform advocate, and progressive Republican politician from Vernon County, Wisconsin. He served four terms in the United States House of Representatives, representing Wisconsin's 7th congressional district from 1921 to 1929. He was a close ally of Wisconsin governor and U.S. senator Robert M. "Fighting Bob" La Follette. Working for La Follette's administration earlier in his career, Beck contributed significantly to the crafting of Wisconsin's worker's compensation laws through his work on the Bureau of Labor and Industrial Statistics. He was then one of the initial appointees to the Wisconsin Industrial Commission (serving from 1911 through 1917) and was chairman of the commission from 1915 through 1917.

His name was often abbreviated J. D. Beck. Throughout his life, he was also sometimes incorrectly referred to as "John D. Beck". Due to his role in the Industrial Commission, he was the editor for the Wisconsin Blue Book for 1907, 1909, and 1911.

== Early life ==
Joseph D. Beck was born on his family's farm in the town of Webster, Vernon County, Wisconsin, near Bloomingdale. After his early schooling, he went to work as a farmhand in the town of Magnolia, Rock County, Wisconsin. During that time, he began teaching school and studying in his spare time. He finally entered Stevens Point Normal School in the 1890s, graduating in 1897. After four more years teaching and serving as a principal in Westby, Wisconsin, and later Cashton, Wisconsin, he entered the University of Wisconsin at age 35, graduating in 1903.

== State government ==
While in college in Madison, Beck became involved with the nascent progressive movement. At the time of Beck's graduation, Robert M. La Follette was in his first term as governor and had begun enacting his progressive agenda. Beck was hired as deputy commissioner of the state Bureau of Labor and Industrial Statistics before completing his graduation. Two years later, La Follette appointed Beck succeeded Halford Erickson as labor commissioner. For the remainder of his life, Beck was considered part of La Follette's inner circle of progressive allies in the state.

While serving on the Bureau of Labor Statistics, Beck was deeply involved in crafting new labor legislation. He was responsible for a major study of employer liability and worker's compensation which became the basis for Wisconsin's landmark workers' compensation law in 1911—the first such law in the United States (New York had passed a first worker's compensation law, but it was nullified by the courts). The dual aims of the law were to ensure swift and reliable compensation for injured workers, and to protect businesses, taxpayers, and state court resources from the growing volume of tort suits. Workers who had sustained a work injury that rendered them unemployable could be awarded permanent and total disability payments, but were not allowed to sue their employers. Beck's notoriety led to him being offered a role in the federal government, but he was ultimately persuaded to remain in Wisconsin.

He was also one of the authors of the bill which abolished the Bureau of Labor Statistics and replaced it with the Wisconsin Industrial Commission in 1911. When the industrial commission was created, Beck was appointed one of the first three commissioners, along with Charles H. Crownhart and John R. Commons. Beck succeeded Crownhart as chairman of the commission in the fall of 1915.

In 1917, Governor Emanuel L. Philipp declined to renominate Beck for another term on the Industrial Commission. At the time, newspapers speculated that it was because Philipp feared Beck was planning a run for Governor of Wisconsin in 1918. Philipp's fears initially seemed well-founded, by January 1918, La Follette allies were preparing the ground for Beck to challenge Philipp in the Republican primary, and Beck began touring the state meeting with voters. But Beck ultimately did not enter the gubernatorial race, instead endorsing the farmers campaign of James N. Tittemore.

Beck did run for office in 1918 though, he attempted a primary challenge against conservative Republican state senator J. Henry Bennett in the 31st Senate district. Bennett ultimately prevailed by about 350 votes in the Republican primary.

== U.S. Congress ==
Wisconsin's 7th congressional district 1912–1931

A year later, Beck was again rumored as a potential candidate for governor in 1920. Beck announced in April 1920 that he would not run for governor and immediately raised speculation that he was instead planning a primary challenge against Republican U.S. representative John J. Esch. Within days, Beck formally launched his campaign for congress, challenging Esch in the Republican primary for Wisconsin's 7th congressional district. At the time, the 7th congressional district comprised Adams, Clark, Jackson, Juneau, La Crosse, Monroe, Sauk, and Vernon counties, in western Wisconsin. Esch suffered from populist backlash against the railroad re-privatization act which bore his name, the Esch–Cummins Act. Beck ultimately prevailed by 3,700 votes. Beck faced only Prohibition and Socialist opponents in the general election, and prevailed with 78% of the vote. Beck won three more terms in Congress, serving from March 4, 1921, to March 3, 1929. He faced a serious opponent in every congressional primary election, but won large margins in the general elections.

== Gubernatorial race and investigation ==
In 1928, Beck chose not to run for re-election to Congress, and finally ran for Governor of Wisconsin. Beck ran as a La Follette progressive, launching a primary challenge against incumbent Fred R. Zimmerman. A key issue in that primary was prohibition. Beck ran in 1928 as a vehement opponent of prohibition, but his run was complicated by past support for the prohibition amendment. With the incumbent, Zimmerman, floundering however, conservative Republicans threw their support behind popular Sheboygan businessman Walter J. Kohler. Beck was extensively aided in his campaign by both of Wisconsin's U.S. senators, Robert M. La Follette Jr. and John J. Blaine. Kohler ultimately prevailed in the primary, receiving 44% of the vote; Beck placed second with 40%; Zimmerman came in a distant third.

After the primary, a lawsuit was filed by prominent Madison attorney Fred M. Wylie, seeking to remove Kohler from the ballot due to alleged violations of state campaign finance rules. The move, if allowed by the Wisconsin Supreme Court, would have left Beck as the Republican gubernatorial nominee as the runner up in the primary. The Wisconsin Supreme Court, however, rejected the complaint; Kohler was allowed to proceed as the Republican nominee and went on to win the general election. In turn, a John Doe investigation was launched into the finances of the progressive faction in the 1928 Republican primary. The two factions continued to lob accusations about campaign finance violations into the next year. The controversy eventually led to the legislature launching an investigation into the finances of the previous six state elections. The investigation stretched on for another year, as witnesses for either faction publicly aired their various accusations.

== Later years ==
Beck did not run for office again, but supported Philip La Follette in the 1930 gubernatorial election. La Follette defeated Kohler in the primary and became the 27th governor of Wisconsin. After taking office, La Follette appointed Beck to serve on the three-member commission of the Wisconsin Department of Agriculture and Markets.

Beck was a strident advocate during his years with the Agriculture commission, leading to more public disputes and litigation. Shortly after entering office, he went on the attack against the oleo (margarine) market in the state—as an alternative to butter, the product was despised by Wisconsin's dairy farmers. Beck successfully pushed for a 1931 law which forbid the use of state funds for any purchase or use of margarine. The law also levied new fees on wholesalers and manufacturers of margarine, and would require retailers selling margarine to be licensed by the state department of agriculture. Further, Beck announced that he would publish the list of margarine retailers, saying it was so that "farmers could find out who their friends are." The licensing portion of the law was struck down, and Beck was enjoined from making public disclosure of margarine sellers, but the other aspects of the law survived.

In 1933, with dairy prices still depressed due to the Great Depression, the state milk pool—a cooperative of state dairy producers—called for a strike to shock the dairy market. Beck was a vocal opponent of the strike, saying that actions of the milk pool were hurting all of Wisconsin's farmers; he suggested that other initiatives undertaken by the agriculture department would be more effective to boost the dairy price. After reports of violence around the strikes, Beck attacked the milk pool president Walter M. Singler in a radio interview on WTMJ. Singler responded by suing Beck and WTMJ's parent company, the Milwaukee Journal, for slander.

Beck died of a heart attack in his apartment in Madison on November 8, 1936. He sat down to write a letter to his wife, complaining in the letter about his pounding heart and anxiety about his health, but left the letter incomplete when the heart attack became severe. After calling the hospital, he commented to neighbors "My father went this way, too." He died before medical assistance could arrive.

== Personal life and family ==
Joseph Beck was the eldest surviving son of 12 children born to Mitchell Beck and his wife Susannah (née Snodgrass). He married Sarah Jane Peavey, also a native of Vernon County, Wisconsin, in 1888. They had two daughters together, but both died in infancy.

== Electoral history ==
=== Wisconsin Senate (1918) ===
Year	Election	Date	Elected				Defeated				Total	Plurality
1918	Primary	Sep. 7	J. Henry Bennett (inc)	Republican	2,865	53.33%	Joseph D. Beck	Rep.	2,507	46.67%	5,372	358

=== U.S. House (1920–1926) ===
Year	Election	Date	Elected				Defeated				Total	Plurality
1920	Primary	Sep. 7	Joseph D. Beck	Republican	20,904	54.85%	John J. Esch (inc)	Rep.	17,198	45.12%	38,112	3,706
1920	General	Nov. 2	Joseph D. Beck	Republican	37,137	78.41%	Robert H. Clarke	Proh.	8,929	18.85%	47,360	28,208
1920	General	Nov. 2	Joseph D. Beck	Republican	37,137	78.41%	A. W. Steinbach	Soc.	1,294	2.73%	47,360	28,208
1922	Primary	Sep. 5	Joseph D. Beck (inc)	Republican	31,204	69.40%	A. C. Kingsford	Rep.	13,761	30.60%	44,965	17,443
1922	General	Nov. 7	Joseph D. Beck (inc)	Republican	27,371	87.40%	Bert A. Jolivette	Ind.D.	3,923	12.53%	31,318	23,448
1924	Primary	Sep. 2	Joseph D. Beck (inc)	Republican	22,816	55.46%	Merlin Hull	Rep.	18,315	44.52%	41,143	4,501
1924	General	Nov. 4	Joseph D. Beck (inc)	Republican	47,075	79.98%	W. D. Martin	Dem.	10,228	17.38%	58,861	36,847
1924	General	Nov. 4	Joseph D. Beck (inc)	Republican	47,075	79.98%	Gay Harrison	Proh.	1,528	2.60%	58,861	36,847
1926	Primary	Sep. 7	Joseph D. Beck (inc)	Republican	22,180	51.88%	Merlin Hull	Rep.	17,497	40.93%	42,752	4,683
1926	Primary	Sep. 7	Joseph D. Beck (inc)	Republican	22,180	51.88%	Fred H. Ferguson	Rep.	3,074	7.19%	42,752	4,683
1926	General	Nov. 2	Joseph D. Beck (inc)	Republican	32,479	86.04%	A. H. Schubert	Ind.D.	3,628	9.61%	37,747	28,851
1926	General	Nov. 2	Joseph D. Beck (inc)	Republican	32,479	86.04%	Henry N. Stephenson	Proh.	1,613	4.27%	37,747	28,851

=== Wisconsin Governor (1928) ===
Wisconsin Gubernatorial Election, 1928
Party	Candidate	Votes	%	±%
Republican Primary, September 4, 1928
Republican	Walter J. Kohler	224,421	43.65%	
Republican	Joseph D. Beck	203,359	39.55%	
Republican	Fred R. Zimmerman (incumbent)	82,837	16.11%	−30.64pp
Republican	John E. Ferris	3,448	0.67%	
	Scattering	70	0.01%	−0.04pp
Plurality		21,062	4.10%	-3.99pp
Total votes		514,135	100.0%	+11.51%

== Published works ==
- Beck, J. D., ed. (1907). The Blue Book of the State of Wisconsin 1907 (Report). Wisconsin Bureau of Labor and Industrial Statistics.
- Beck, J. D., ed. (1909). The Blue Book of the State of Wisconsin 1909 (Report). Wisconsin Bureau of Labor and Industrial Statistics.
- Beck, J. D., ed. (1911). The Blue Book of the State of Wisconsin 1911 (Report). Wisconsin Bureau of Labor and Industrial Statistics.

U.S. House of Representatives
Preceded by John J. Esch	Member of the U.S. House of Representatives from Wisconsin's 7th congressional district March 4, 1921 - March 3, 1929	Succeeded by Merlin Hull
Government offices
Preceded by Halford Erickson	Commissioner of the Wisconsin Bureau of Labor Statistics; June 1905 – July 1, 1911	Bureau abolished
Preceded by Charles H. Crownhart	Chairman of the Wisconsin Industrial Commission; September 1915 – July 1917	Succeeded by George Hambrecht
