= List of United States senators in the 56th Congress =

This is a complete list of United States senators during the 56th United States Congress listed by seniority from March 4, 1899, to March 3, 1901.

Order of service is based on the commencement of the senator's first term. Behind this is former service as a senator (only giving the senator seniority within their new incoming class), service as vice president, a House member, a cabinet secretary, or a governor of a state. The final factor is the population of the senator's state.

Senators who were sworn in during the middle of the Congress (up until the last senator who was not sworn in early after winning the November 1900 election) are listed at the end of the list with no number.

== Terms of service ==
Class	Terms of service of senators that expired in years
Class 2	Terms of service of senators that expired in 1901 (AL, AR, CO, DE, GA, IA, ID, IL, KS, KY, LA, MA, ME, MI, MN, MS, MT, NC, NE, NH, NJ, OR, RI, SC, SD, TN, TX, VA, WV, and WY.)
Class 3	Terms of service of senators that expired in 1903 (AL, AR, CA, CO, CT, FL, GA, IA, ID, IL, IN, KS, KY, LA, MD, MO, NC, ND, NH, NV, NY, OH, OR, PA, SC, SD, UT, VT, WA, and WI.)
Class 1	Terms of service of senators that expired in 1905 (CA, CT, DE, FL, IN, MA, MD, ME, MI, MN, MO, MS, MT, ND, NE, NJ, NV, NY, OH, PA, RI, TN, TX, UT, VA, VT, WA, WI, WV, and WY.)

== U.S. Senate seniority list ==
U.S. Senate seniority
Rank	Senator (party-state)	Seniority date	Other factors
1	William B. Allison (R-IA)	March 4, 1873	Former representative
2	John P. Jones (R-NV)	March 4, 1873	
3	Francis Cockrell (D-MO)	March 4, 1875	
4	George F. Hoar (R-MA)	March 4, 1877	Former representative
5	John Tyler Morgan (D-AL)	March 4, 1877	
6	George G. Vest (D-MO)	March 4, 1879	Missouri 5th in population (1870)
7	Orville H. Platt (R-CT)	March 4, 1879	Connecticut 25th in population (1870)
8	Eugene Hale (R-ME)	March 4, 1881	Former representative (10 years)
9	Joseph Hawley (R-CT)	March 4, 1881	Former representative (5 years)
10	William P. Frye (R-ME)	March 18, 1881	Former representative
11	Nelson Aldrich (R-RI)	October 5, 1881	
12	Shelby Moore Cullom (R-IL)	March 4, 1883	
13	Henry M. Teller (D-CO)	March 4, 1885	Previously a senator
14	James K. Jones (D-AR)	March 4, 1885	
15	James H. Berry (D-AR)	March 20, 1885	
16	William M. Stewart (R-NV)	March 4, 1887	Previously a senator
17	John W. Daniel (D-VA)	March 4, 1887	Former representative
18	William B. Bate (D-TN)	March 4, 1887	Former governor, Tennessee 12th in population (1880)
19	Cushman Davis (R-MN)	March 4, 1887	Former governor, Minnesota 26th in population (1880)
20	Samuel Pasco (D-FL)	May 19, 1887	
21	James McMillan (R-MI)	March 4, 1889	Michigan 9th in population (1880)
22	Edward O. Wolcott (R-CO)	March 4, 1889	Colorado 35th in population (1880)
23	William E. Chandler (R-NH)	June 18, 1889	
24	Richard F. Pettigrew (SR-SD)	November 2, 1889	Former delegate
25	George L. Shoup (R-ID)	December 18, 1890	Former governor
26	Jacob H. Gallinger (R-NH)	March 4, 1891	Former representative (4 years)
27	Henry C. Hansbrough (R-ND)	March 4, 1891	Former representative (2 years)
28	James H. Kyle (R-SD)	March 4, 1891	
29	Redfield Proctor (R-VT)	November 2, 1891	Former governor
30	Donelson Caffery (D-LA)	December 31, 1892	
31	William Lindsay (D-KY)	February 15, 1893	
32	Henry Cabot Lodge (R-MA)	March 4, 1893	Former representative
33	George C. Perkins (R-CA)	July 26, 1893	Former governor
34	Julius C. Burrows (R-MI)	January 23, 1895	Former representative (3 times)
35	Clarence D. Clark (R-WY)	January 24, 1895	Former representative
36	Jeter C. Pritchard (R-NC)	January 24, 1895	
37	William J. Sewell (R-NJ)	March 4, 1895	Previously a senator (6 years)
38	Francis E. Warren (R-WY)	March 4, 1895	Previously a senator (3 years)
39	Horace Chilton (D-TX)	March 4, 1895	Previously a senator (2 years)
40	Thomas Carter (R-MT)	March 4, 1895	Former delegate, former representative
41	Stephen Elkins (R-WV)	March 4, 1895	Former delegate, former cabinet member
42	John H. Gear (R-IA)	March 4, 1895	Former governor, Iowa 10th in population (1890)
43	Knute Nelson (R-MN)	March 4, 1895	Former governor, Minnesota 20th in population (1890)
44	Benjamin Tillman (D-SC)	March 4, 1895	Former governor, South Carolina 23rd in population (1890)
45	George P. Wetmore (R-RI)	March 4, 1895	Former governor, Rhode Island 36th in population (1890)
46	Augustus O. Bacon (D-GA)	March 4, 1895	Georgia 12th in population (1890)
47	Thomas S. Martin (D-VA)	March 4, 1895	Virginia 15th in population (1890)
48	Marion Butler (PP-NC)	March 4, 1895	North Carolina 16th in population (1890)
49	Lucien Baker (R-KS)	March 4, 1895	Kansas 19th in population (1890)
50	John M. Thurston (R-NE)	March 4, 1895	Nebraska 26th in population (1890)
51	George McBride (R-OR)	March 4, 1895	Oregon 38th in population (1890)
52	Richard Kenney (D-DE)	January 19, 1897	
53	John C. Spooner (R-WI)	March 4, 1897	Previously a senator (6 years)
54	Thomas C. Platt (R-NY)	March 4, 1897	Previously a senator (2 months)
55	William E. Mason (R-IL)	March 4, 1897	Former representative (4 years)
56	William A. Harris (PP-KS)	March 4, 1897	Former representative (2 years), Kansas 19th in population (1890)
57	George L. Wellington (R-MD)	March 4, 1897	Former representative (2 years), Maryland 27th in population (1890)
58	Joseph Rawlins (D-UT)	March 4, 1897	Former delegate
59	Joseph Foraker (R-OH)	March 4, 1897	Former governor, Ohio 4th in population (1890)
60	Samuel McEnery (D-LA)	March 4, 1897	Former governor, Louisiana 25th in population (1890)
61	Boies Penrose (R-PA)	March 4, 1897	Pennsylvania 2nd in population (1890)
62	Charles W. Fairbanks (R-IN)	March 4, 1897	Indiana 8th in population (1890)
63	William Deboe (R-KY)	March 4, 1897	Kentucky 11th in population (1890)
64	Alexander Clay (D-GA)	March 4, 1897	Georgia 12th in population (1890)
65	Edmund Pettus (D-AL)	March 4, 1897	Alabama 17th in population (1890)
66	George Turner (SR-WA)	March 4, 1897	Washington 34th in population (1890)
67	Henry Heitfeld (PP-ID)	March 4, 1897	Idaho 43rd in population (1890)
68	Mark Hanna (R-OH)	March 6, 1897	
69	Stephen Mallory (D-FL)	May 15, 1897	
70	John L. McLaurin (D-SC)	June 1, 1897	
71	Thomas B. Turley (D-TN)	July 20, 1897	
72	Hernando Money (D-MS)	October 8, 1897	
73	William V. Sullivan (D-MS)	May 31, 1898	
74	Joseph Simon (R-OR)	October 8, 1898	
75	Jonathan Ross (R-VT)	January 11, 1899	
76	Louis McComas (R-MD)	March 4, 1899	Former representative (8 years)
77	John Kean (R-NJ)	March 4, 1899	Former representative (4 years)
78	Charles A. Culberson (D-TX)	March 4, 1899	Former governor
79	Chauncey Depew (R-NY)	March 4, 1899	New York 1st in population (1890)
80	Albert J. Beveridge (R-IN)	March 4, 1899	Indiana 8th in population (1890)
81	Joseph Quarles (R-WI)	March 4, 1899	Wisconsin 14th in population (1890)
82	Nathan B. Scott (R-WV)	March 4, 1899	West Virginia 28th in population (1890)
83	Addison Foster (R-WA)	March 4, 1899	Washington 34th in population (1890)
84	Porter McCumber (R-ND)	March 4, 1899	North Dakota 41st in population (1890)
85	William A. Clark (D-MT)	March 4, 1899	Montana 44th in population (1890)
86	Monroe Hayward (R-NE)	March 8, 1899	
87	James Taliaferro (D-FL)	April 20, 1899	
	William V. Allen (PP-NE)	December 13, 1899	
88	Thomas R. Bard (R-CA)	February 7, 1900	
	Jonathan P. Dolliver (R-IA)	August 22, 1900	Former representative
	William P. Dillingham (R-VT)	October 18, 1900	
	Charles A. Towne (R-MN)	December 5, 1900	Former representative
89	Matthew Quay (R-PA)	January 16, 1901	Previously a senator
	Moses Clapp (R-MN)	January 23, 1901	Minnesota 20th in population (1890)
90	Thomas Kearns (R-UT)	January 23, 1901	Utah 40th in population (1890)

== See also ==
- 56th United States Congress
- List of United States representatives in the 56th Congress
