= Patrick Henry (Mississippi politician) =

American politician (1843–1930)

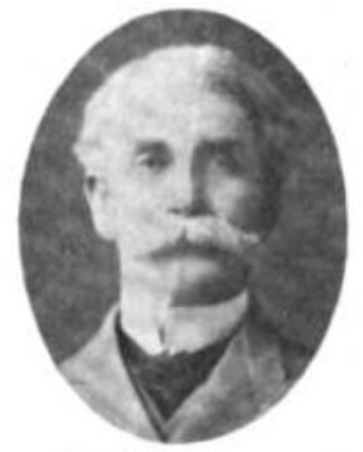

Member of the U.S. House of Representatives from Mississippi's 7th district
- In office March 4, 1897 – March 3, 1901
- Preceded by: James G. Spencer
- Succeeded by: Charles E. Hooker

Member of the Mississippi State Senate
- In office January 5, 1904 – January 7, 1908
- Preceded by: William H. Hughes
- Succeeded by: W. T. Simmons

Member of the Mississippi House of Representatives from the Rankin County district
- In office 1888–1890

Personal details
- Born: February 12, 1843 Cynthia, Mississippi
- Died: May 18, 1930 (aged 87) Brandon, Mississippi
- Party: Democratic
- Education: Madison College
- Occupation: Lawyer, politician

Patrick Henry (February 12, 1843 – May 18, 1930) was a U.S. representative from Mississippi.

== Biography ==
Patrick Henry was born on February 12, 1843, near Cynthia, Mississippi. He was the son of Patrick Henry and Bettie (West) Henry, who had moved to Mississippi from Christian County, Kentucky. Henry attended the common schools, Mississippi College, Clinton, Mississippi, Madison College, Sharon, Mississippi, and the Nashville (Tennessee) Military College. He moved to Brandon, Mississippi, in 1858. He enlisted in the Confederate service as a first lieutenant in Company B, Sixth Mississippi Infantry Regiment, in 1861. He served throughout the Civil War and surrendered at Greensboro, North Carolina, April 26, 1865, as major of the Fourteenth (Consolidated) Mississippi Regiment. He engaged in agricultural pursuits in Hinds and Rankin Counties until 1873. He studied law. He was admitted to the bar in 1873 and commenced practice in Brandon. He served as member of the Mississippi House of Representatives, representing Rankin County, from 1888 to 1890. He served as delegate to the State constitutional convention in 1890. He served as assistant United States district attorney in 1896.

Henry was elected as a Democrat to the Fifty-fifth and Fifty-sixth Congresses (March 4, 1897 – March 3, 1901). He was an unsuccessful candidate for renomination in 1900 He resumed the practice of law in Brandon. In 1903, Henry then ran to represent the 5th District (Rankin and Smith counties) in the Mississippi State Senate for the 1904-1908 term. He won the Democratic primary on August 27, 1903. He then won the general election on November 3, 1903. He served as mayor of Brandon from 1916 until his death in Brandon, Mississippi, May 18, 1930. He was interred in Brandon Cemetery.

His nephew, Pat Henry, was elected in a different congressional district in Mississippi in the term after he left office.

== Personal life ==
Henry was a member of the Episcopal Church. He was also a member of the Freemasons and Knights of Honor. He married Maggie E. Cocke on February 10, 1874. By 1904, they had three surviving children, named Patrick Jr., Edmund, and Annie S.

His brother, Adjutant General William Henry, was mayor of Jackson.

== Notes ==
U.S. House of Representatives
Preceded by James G. Spencer	Member of the U.S. House of Representatives from Mississippi's 7th congressional district 1897–1901	Succeeded by Charles E. Hooker
