= Ethelbert Barksdale =

American politician

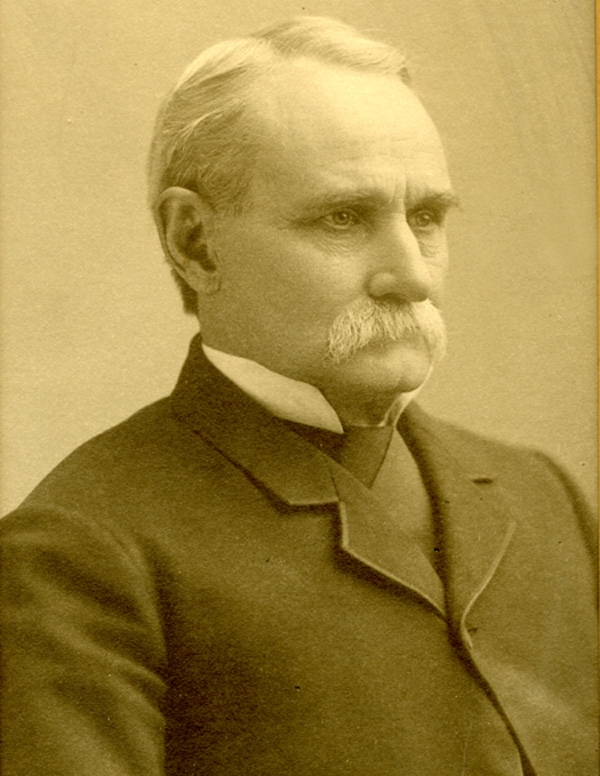

Member of the U.S. House of Representatives from Mississippi's 7th district
- In office March 4, 1883 – March 3, 1887
- Preceded by: District created
- Succeeded by: Charles E. Hooker

Member of the Confederate House of Representatives for Mississippi
- In office February 18, 1862 – March 18, 1865

Personal details
- Born: January 4, 1824 Smyrna, Tennessee, U.S.
- Died: February 17, 1893 (aged 69) Yazoo City, Mississippi, U.S.
- Resting place: Greenwood Cemetery, Jackson, Mississippi, U.S.
- Party: Democratic
- Occupation: Journalist

Ethelbert Barksdale (January 4, 1824 – February 17, 1893) was a slave owner, a U.S. Representative from Mississippi, and a member of the Confederate States Congress during the American Civil War.

== Biography ==
Barksdale was born in Smyrna, Tennessee, to William Barksdale and Nancy Hervey Lester. He was the younger brother of William Barksdale, a Confederate general who was killed at the Battle of Gettysburg during the Civil War. Ethelbert Barksdale moved to Jackson, Mississippi, as a young man and later adopted journalism as a profession. He edited the official journal of the state from 1854 to 1861 and again in 1876–1883, served as editor of the Jackson Clarion, was active in Democratic Party politics, and earned the moniker, the Sir Robert Peel, of Mississippi.

He strongly advocated for Mississippi's secession from the Union at the start of the Civil War. Following the formation of the Confederacy, Barksdale served as member of the First Confederate Congress and the Second Confederate Congress in the House of Representatives from 1862 to 1865, where he was a vocal ally of the Davis administration's policies.

Near the war's end, in an effort to provide recruits for the Confederate States Army, Barksdale introduced legislation that would permit enslaved African-Americans to fight for the South against the Union, a measure supported by Robert E. Lee. Initially it passed the Confederate House, was barely defeated in the Senate, but weeks later, a version of this "last resort" effort was eventually approved, though never implemented.

Returning to editing the Clarion and politics in Mississippi during Reconstruction, Barksdale served as delegate to the Democratic National Conventions in 1860, 1868, 1872, and 1880. He served as chairman of the Democratic State executive committee from 1877 to 1879.

Barksdale was elected to the United States House of Representatives as a Democrat to the Forty-eighth and Forty-ninth Congresses (March 4, 1883 – March 3, 1887). He was an unsuccessful candidate for reelection in 1886, and then engaged in agricultural pursuits in Yazoo County.

He died in Yazoo City, Mississippi, on February 17, 1893, and was interred in Greenwood Cemetery, Jackson, Mississippi.

== Family ==
In 1843 he married Alice-Jane Harris (1826–1906) and they had three children.

U.S. House of Representatives
Preceded by District created	Member of the U.S. House of Representatives from Mississippi's 7th congressional district 1883–1887	Succeeded by Charles E. Hooker
