= James G. Spencer =

American politician (1844–1926)

Member of the U.S. House of Representatives from Missouri's 7th district
- In office March 4, 1895 – March 3, 1897
- Preceded by: Charles E. Hooker
- Succeeded by: Patrick Henry

Member of the Missouri House of Representatives
- In office 1892–1894

Personal details
- Born: James Grafton Spencer; September 13, 1844 near Port Gibson, Mississippi, U.S.
- Died: February 22, 1926 (aged 81) Port Gibson, Mississippi, U.S.
- Resting place: Wintergreen Cemetery, Port Gibson, Mississippi, U.S.
- Party: Democratic
- Education: Oakland College
- Occupation: Politician

Military service
- Allegiance: Confederate States of America
- Branch/service: Confederate States Army
- Battles/wars: American Civil War

James Grafton Spencer (September 13, 1844 – February 22, 1926) was a U.S. representative from Mississippi.

== Biography ==
Born near Port Gibson, Mississippi, Spencer attended private schools and Oakland College in 1861. During the Civil War enlisted in the Confederate States Army as a private in Cowan's battery of Light Artillery. He served until the close of the Civil War in the Army of Mississippi and in the Army of Tennessee. He returned to his home and engaged in agricultural pursuits. He served as member of the State house of representatives 1892–1894.

Spencer was elected as a Democrat to the Fifty-fourth Congress (March 4, 1895 – March 3, 1897). He engaged in the real estate and insurance business. He died in Port Gibson, Mississippi, February 22, 1926. He was interred in Wintergreen Cemetery.

U.S. House of Representatives
Preceded by Charles E. Hooker	Member of the U.S. House of Representatives from Mississippi's 7th congressional district 1895–1897	Succeeded by Patrick Henry
