= Jeremiah Dobbs =

American politician (1832–1909)

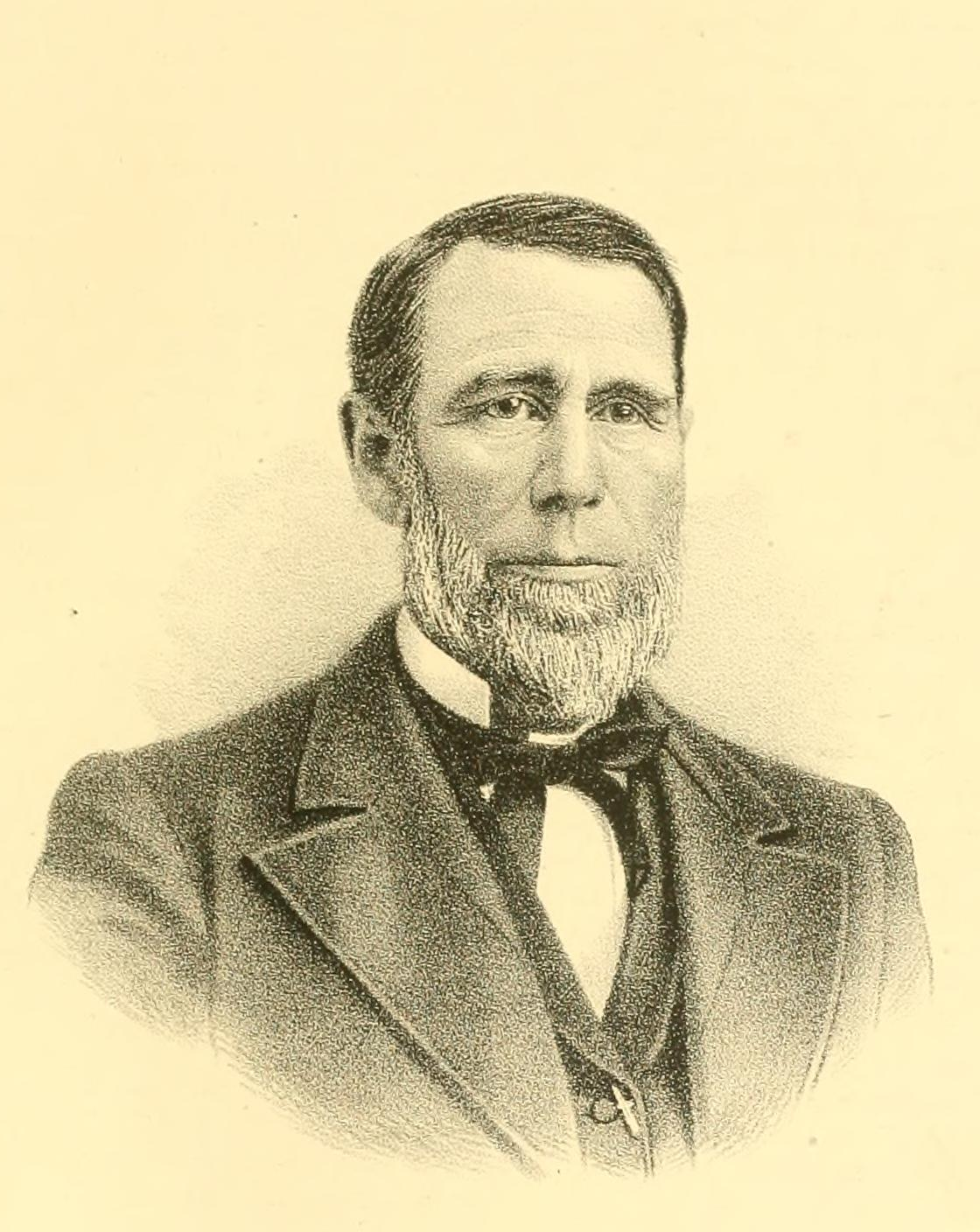
- From The History of Fond du Lac County, Wisconsin (1880)

Commissioner of the Wisconsin Bureau of Labor, Census, and Industrial Statistics
- In office January 1891 – April 1895
- Governor: George Wilbur Peck; William H. Upham
- Preceded by: Henry M. Stark
- Succeeded by: Halford Erickson

Member of the Wisconsin State Assembly from the Fond du Lac 1st district
- In office January 3, 1870 – January 2, 1871
- Preceded by: Henry C. Bottum
- Succeeded by: Jehdeiah Bowen

Personal details
- Born: March 24, 1832 Saugerties, New York, U.S.
- Died: August 8, 1909 (aged 77) Ripon, Wisconsin, U.S.
- Resting place: Hillside Cemetery, Ripon
- Party: Democratic
- Spouse: Mary A. Lampson (m. 1854; died 1891)
- Children: Blanche "Nellie" (Taylor)^{(b. 1869; died 1952)}; Mary Dobbs; at least 1 son

Jeremiah "Jerre" Dobbs, Jr., (March 24, 1832 – August 8, 1909) was an American lawyer, Democratic politician, and Wisconsin pioneer. He served in the Wisconsin State Assembly, representing Fond du Lac County during the 1870 session, and served as commissioner of the Wisconsin Bureau of Labor, Census, and Industrial Statistics during the 1890s.

== Biography ==
Jeremiah Dobbs, Jr., was born in March 1832, in Saugerties, New York. He received a common school education at Williamson, New York, then went to work as a clerk in a general store in Rochester, New York. He began the study of law at Newark, New Jersey, but went west to Wisconsin in 1849, and settled at Lake Mills. He continued his study of the law and was admitted to the bar at Jefferson, Wisconsin, in 1851, then began a practice in Lake Mills.

He moved to Ripon, Wisconsin, about 1853 and became one of the most prominent lawyers in that part of the state. He served for several years as a member of the Ripon city council and the Fond du Lac County board of supervisors, and was chairman of the county board. He was an unsuccessful candidate for district attorney in 1862. He was elected to the Wisconsin State Assembly in 1869, representing Fond du Lac County's 1st Assembly district—the northwestern corner of the county. He ran for Wisconsin State Senate in 1872, but lost to William Hiner.

Dobbs was a staunch Democrat and was a frequent delegate to state and district Democratic conventions. His contemporaries described him as one of the political bosses of the Fond du Lac County Democratic Party, who "took conventions under their wings and flew away with them."

He was a friend and political ally of George Wilbur Peck, and after Peck was elected governor, he appointed Dobbs to the position of commissioner of the Wisconsin Bureau of Labor, Census, and Industrial Statistics. Dobbs served through Peck's two terms as governor, and remained after his term ended, arguing that the new governor did not have the authority to remove him. The Legislature finally passed a law in March 1895 which legislated Dobbs out of the office.

In addition to his legal career, Dobbs was a director of the Oshkosh & Mississippi Railroad Co. He was elected city attorney of Ripon several times, including his election in 1908, despite not running for the office in that election.

He was found dead in his home in Ripon on August 8, 1909.

Wisconsin State Assembly
| Preceded by Henry C. Bottum | Member of the Wisconsin State Assembly from the Fond du Lac 1st district January 3, 1870 – January 2, 1871 | Succeeded by Jehdeiah Bowen |
Government offices
| Preceded by Henry M. Stark | Commissioner of the Wisconsin Bureau of Labor, Census, and Industrial Statistics; January 1891 – April 1895 | Succeeded by Halford Erickson |
