= Joseph A. Baker =

American politician

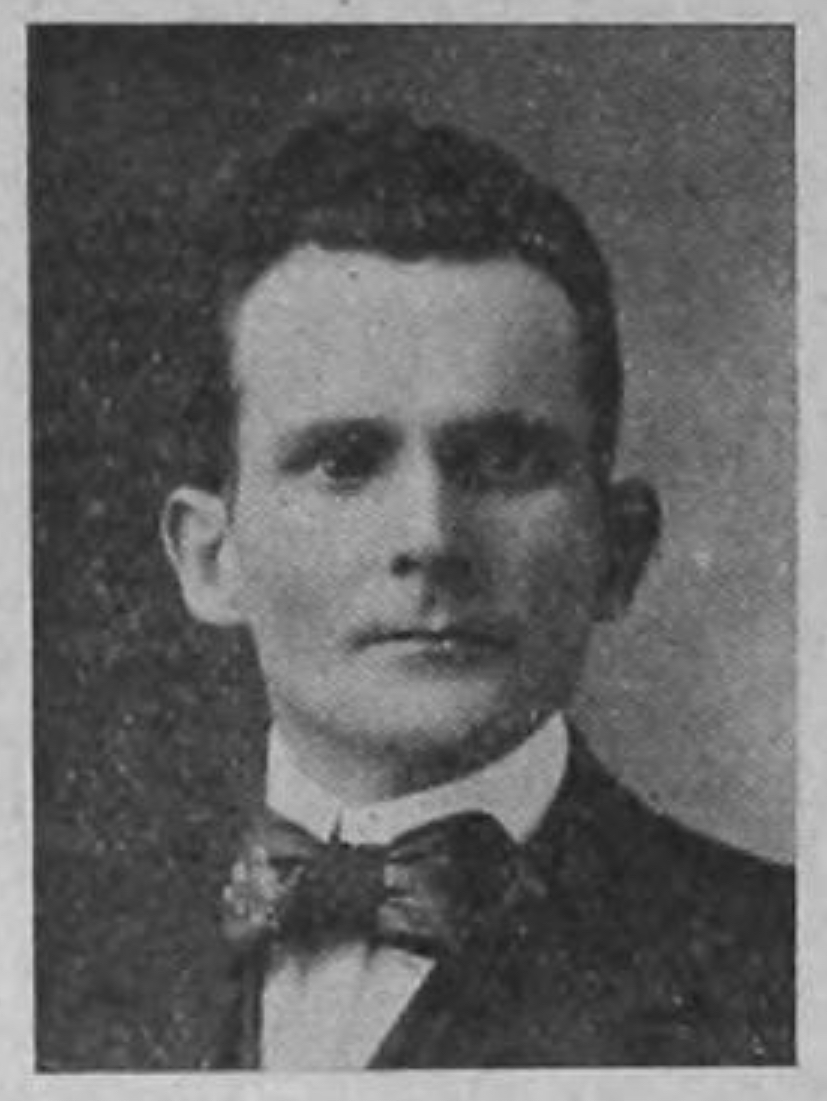
- 1917

Member of the Mississippi Senate from the 12th district
- In office January 1916 – January 1920

Personal details
- Born: November 7, 1883 Sharon, Mississippi
- Died: March 15, 1959 (aged 75)
- Party: Democrat

Joseph Atkins Baker (November 7, 1883 – March 15, 1959) was a Democratic member of the Mississippi State Senate, representing Mississippi's 12th senatorial district, from 1916 to 1920.

== Biography ==
Joseph Atkins Baker was born on November 7, 1883, in Sharon, Madison County, Mississippi. He was the son of William Jackson Baker and Almyra Atkins. Baker attended the public schools of Madison County, Mississippi, and Shreveport High School. He graduated from Millsaps College with B. S. and Ph. B. degrees in 1906. He took a law course in Millsaps from 1908 to 1909 and received a Bachelor of Laws degree. He moved to Jackson, Mississippi, in 1910 and began practicing law there. In 1915, he was elected to represent Mississippi's 12th senatorial district as a Democrat in the Mississippi State Senate for the 1916-1920 term. Baker served in the U. S. Army in World War I as a First Lieutenant. He died on March 15, 1959.
