= William A. Dickson =

American politician (1861–1940)

William Alexander Dickson

Member of the U.S. House of Representatives from Mississippi's 7th district
- In office March 4, 1909 – March 3, 1913
- Preceded by: Frank A. McLain
- Succeeded by: Percy E. Quin

Personal details
- Born: July 20, 1861 Centreville, Mississippi
- Died: February 25, 1940 (aged 78) Centreville, Mississippi
- Resting place: Oaklawn Cemetery
- Party: Democratic Party
- Education: Centenary College, Jackson, Louisiana; Vanderbilt University, Nashville, Tennessee
- Occupation: Politician, agriculturalist

William Alexander Dickson (July 20, 1861 – February 25, 1940) was a U.S. representative from Mississippi.

Born in Centreville, Mississippi, Dickson attended private and public schools, Pleasant Grove School, Centenary College, Jackson, Louisiana, and Vanderbilt University, Nashville, Tennessee. He studied law but did not practice it, instead engaging in agricultural pursuits. Dickson worked as a supervisor from 1886 to 1888, before serving as a member of the state house of representatives from 1887 to 1893. Working as the school commissioner of Wilkinson County, he served as member of the board of trustees of the Agricultural and Mechanical College, Starkville, Mississippi, and of Edward Magehee College, Woodville, Mississippi, for five years.

Dickson was elected as a Democrat to the Sixty-first and Sixty-second Congresses (March 4, 1909 – March 3, 1913).

Dickson was elected supervisor of the third district of Wilkinson County and superintendent of its highways in 1927. He died in Centreville, Mississippi, February 25, 1940, and was interred in Oaklawn Cemetery.

U.S. House of Representatives
Preceded by Frank A. McLain	Member of the U.S. House of Representatives from Mississippi's 7th congressional district 1909–1913	Succeeded by Percy E. Quin
