= Eaton J. Bowers =

American politician (1865–1939)

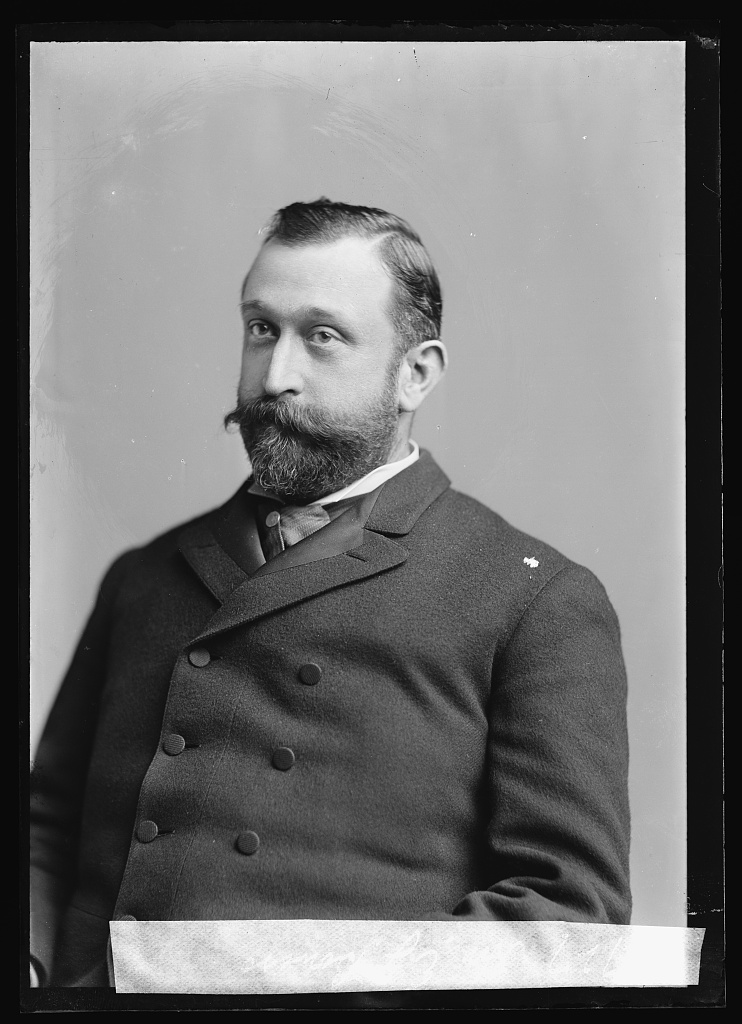
- Bowers photographed by C. M. Bell Studio

Member of the U.S. House of Representatives from Mississippi's 6th district
- In office March 4, 1903 – March 3, 1911
- Preceded by: Frank A. McLain
- Succeeded by: Pat Harrison

Member of the Mississippi House of Representatives
- In office 1900

Member of the Mississippi State Senate
- In office 1896

Personal details
- Born: Eaton Jackson Bowers; June 17, 1865 Canton, Mississippi, U.S.
- Died: October 26, 1939 (aged 74) New Orleans, Louisiana, U.S.
- Resting place: Cedar Rest Cemetery, Bay St. Louis, Mississippi, U.S.
- Party: Democratic
- Relatives: Samuel Bowers (grandson)
- Occupation: Politician, lawyer

Eaton Jackson Bowers (June 17, 1865 – October 26, 1939) was a U.S. representative from Mississippi.

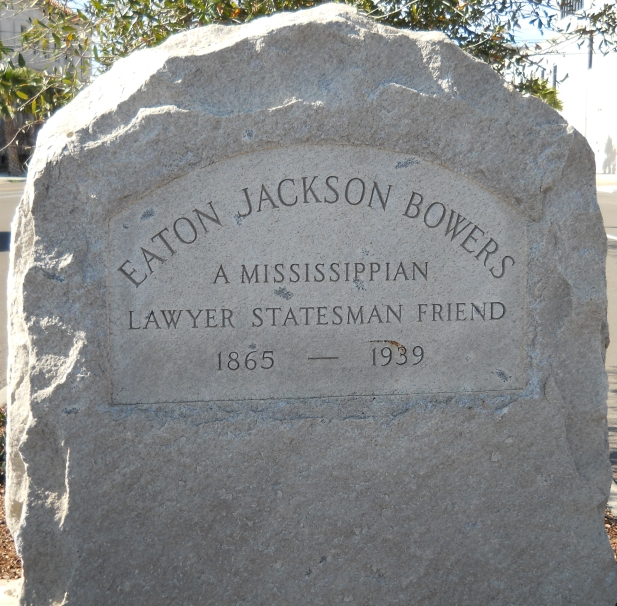
Historical marker

Born in Canton, Mississippi, Bowers attended the public schools, and Mississippi Military Institute at Pass Christian. He studied law and gained admission to the bar in 1883 at the age of seventeen. He practiced in Canton until August 1884, when he moved to Bay St. Louis. There, he engaged in the practice of law and in newspaper work, serving as editor and proprietor of the Gulf Coast Progress at Bay St. Louis. He served as member of the Democratic State executive committee from 1886 to 1900, retiring from the newspaper business in 1890. He served as member of the Mississippi State Senate in 1896, and in the Mississippi House of Representatives in 1900. He served as delegate to the Democratic National Conventions in 1900 and 1916.

Representative Bowers, whose grandson, Samuel Bowers, would co-found the White Knights of the Ku Klux Klan, was an explicitly virulent opponent of equality for African Americans. In a speech to the U.S. House of Representatives in 1904, during his freshman term, he said:

Let me say to the gentleman from Massachusetts that it is evident that we have at least two theories as to how the negro should be dealt with. One may be termed his idea of the development by higher education, social equality, and the like, while the other might be dominated [sic] the Southern idea of the absolute segregation of the two races, the fitting the negro for that sphere and station which, based upon an experience born of more than a century's knowledge of him as a slave and nearly forty years' experience with him as a freedman, we believe he can acceptably and worthily fill, with absolute denial of social intercourse and with every restriction on his participation in political affairs and government that is permissible under the Federal Constitution ... The restriction of suffrage was the wisest statesmanship ever exhibited in that proud Commonwealth ... We have disfranchised not only the ignorant and vicious black but the ignorant and vicious white as well ...

Bowers was elected as a Democrat to the Fifty-eighth and to the three succeeding Congresses (March 4, 1903 – March 3, 1911). He was not a candidate for renomination in 1910 to the Sixty-second Congress. He resumed the practice of law in Bay St. Louis, Hancock County, Mississippi, moving to New Orleans, Louisiana, and continuing the practice of law until his death there on October 26, 1939.

He was interred in Cedar Rest Cemetery, Bay St. Louis, Mississippi.

U.S. House of Representatives
Preceded by Frank A. McLain	Member of the U.S. House of Representatives from Mississippi's 6th congressional district 1903–1911	Succeeded by Pat Harrison
