= Charles E. Hooker =

American politician (1825–1914)

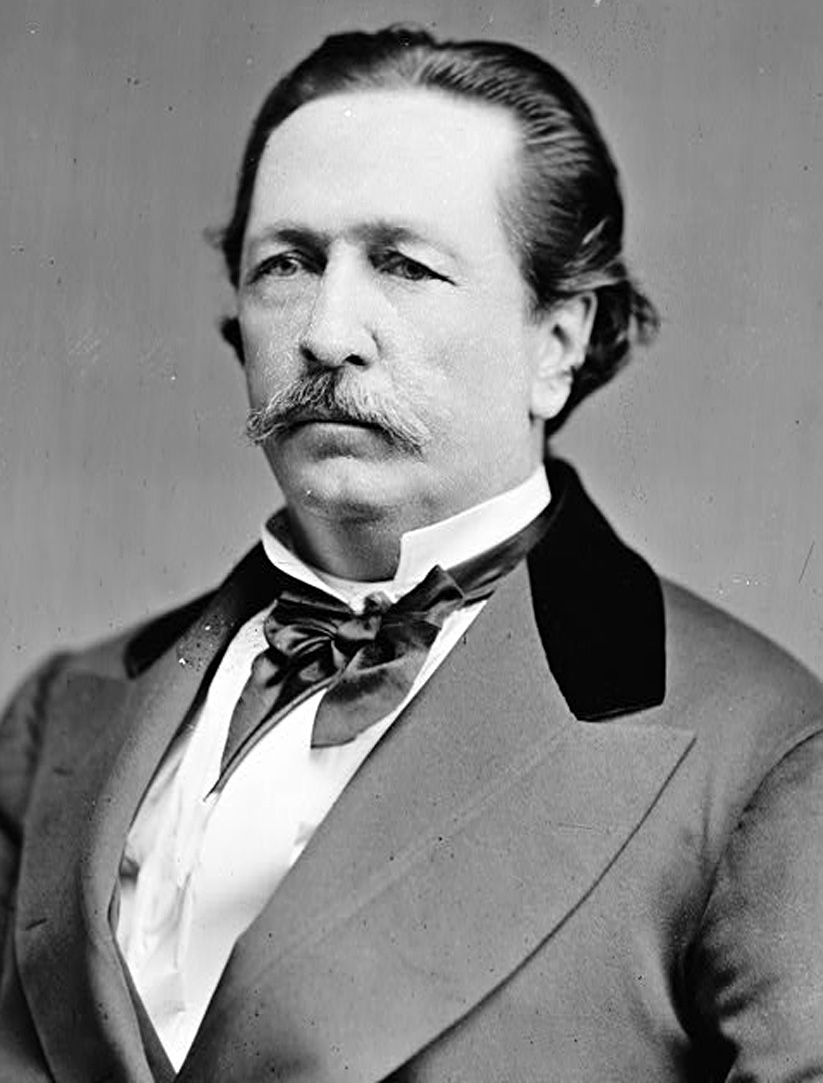
Charles E. Hooker

Charles Edward Hooker (April 9, 1825 – January 8, 1914) was a U.S. representative from Mississippi.

== Biography ==
Born in Union, South Carolina, Hooker was raised in Laurens District, South Carolina. He attended the common schools and graduated from Harvard Law School in 1846. He was admitted to the bar in 1848 and commenced practice in Jackson, Mississippi.

He served as district attorney of the river district 1850–1854. He served as member of the Mississippi House of Representatives in 1859. On December 15, 1860, he was dispatched by the state of Mississippi to South Carolina as a secession commissioner. He was described by one Mississippi newspaper as "a fire-eater of the most ultra disunion stripe." He resigned to enter the Confederate States Army as a private during the Civil War. He became lieutenant and later captain in the First Regiment of Mississippi Light Artillery, losing an arm at the siege of Vicksburg. He was later promoted to the rank of colonel of cavalry.

Hooker was elected Attorney General of Mississippi in 1865 and the same year was removed with the other officers of the state by the U.S. military authorities. Hooker was again elected to the position in 1868. He resumed the practice of law in Jackson, Mississippi.

Hooker was elected as a Democrat to the Forty-fourth and to the three succeeding Congresses (March 4, 1875 – March 3, 1883). He served as delegate to the Democratic National Convention in 1884. Although he had been a strong defender of the Confederacy, he distinguished himself from many Deep South congressman of that era with his opposition to some types of racial discrimination, such as his opposition to efforts to restrict Chinese immigration. Unusual for a southern congressman of that era, Hooker spoke positively about some of the racial change the Civil War had brought, declaring that the former slave had become "a full-fledged American citizen . . . with all the powers, duties, and responsibilities of an intelligent American freeman." Hooker was also one of the few American politicians critical of reforming the Native American policy of the United States by means of destroying tribal sovereignty and allotment of Native American land in severalty. He maintained that allotment would cause citizens of Native American nations to lose their land “and all the proceeds from the sale of it by fraud, force, or violence.” The allotment reforms ultimately were ratified in the Dawes Act of 1887 which, as Hooker presaged, resulted in the loss of 86,000,000 acres of Native American territory nationwide between 1887 and 1934.

Hooker was elected to the Fiftieth Congress and to the three succeeding Congresses (March 4, 1887 – March 3, 1895). Hooker was again elected to the Fifty-seventh Congress (March 4, 1901 – March 3, 1903). He continued the practice of law in Jackson, Mississippi, where he died January 8, 1914. He was interred in Greenwood Cemetery.

== Bibliography ==
- Wheeler, Joseph Lt. Gen., and Col. Charles E. Hooker (1899). Vol. XII of Confederate Military History. 12 vols. Ed. Brig. Gen. Clement A. Evans. Atlanta: Confederate Publishing.

Legal offices
Preceded by T.J. Wharton	Attorney General of Mississippi; 1865–1868	Succeeded by Jasper Myers
U.S. House of Representatives
Preceded by George C. McKee	Member of the U.S. House of Representatives from Mississippi's 5th congressional district 1875–1883	Succeeded by Otho R. Singleton
Preceded by Ethelbert Barksdale	Member of the U.S. House of Representatives from Mississippi's 7th congressional district 1887–1895	Succeeded by James G. Spencer
Preceded by Patrick Henry	Member of the U.S. House of Representatives from Mississippi's 7th congressional district 1901–1903	Succeeded by Frank A. McLain
