= SS Frank Flowers =

Liberty ship of WWII

History

United States
- Name: Frank Flowers
- Namesake: Frank Flowers
- Owner: War Shipping Administration (WSA)
- Operator: American Export Lines, Inc.
- Ordered: as type (EC2-S-C5) hull, MC hull 3141
- Builder: J.A. Jones Construction, Panama City, Florida
- Cost: $841,060
- Yard number: 101
- Way number: 5
- Laid down: 9 May 1945
- Launched: 22 June 1945
- Completed: 16 July 1945
- Identification: Call sign: AOEL
- Fate: Placed in the Hudson River Reserve Fleet, Jones Point, New York, 26 October 1945; Placed in the, Beaumont Reserve Fleet, Beaumont, Texas, 21 August 1953; Sold for scrapping, 15 July 1974, removed from fleet, 5 August 1974

General characteristics
- Class & type: Liberty ship; type EC2-S-C5, boxed aircraft transport
- Tonnage: 10,600 LT DWT; 7,200 GRT
- Displacement: 3,380 long tons (3,434 t) (light); 14,245 long tons (14,474 t) (max)
- Length: 441 feet 6 inches (135 m) oa; 416 feet (127 m) pp; 427 feet (130 m) lwl
- Beam: 57 feet (17 m)
- Draft: 27 ft 9.25 in (8.4646 m)
- Installed power: 2 × Oil fired 450 °F (232 °C) boilers, operating at 220 psi (1,500 kPa); 2,500 hp (1,900 kW)
- Propulsion: 1 × triple-expansion steam engine, (manufactured by Filer and Stowell, Milwaukee, Wisconsin); 1 × screw propeller
- Speed: 11.5 knots (21.3 km/h; 13.2 mph)
- Capacity: 490,000 cubic feet (13,875 m^{3}) (bale)
- Complement: 38–62 USMM; 21–40 USNAG
- Armament: Varied by ship; Bow-mounted 3-inch (76 mm)/50-caliber gun; Stern-mounted 4-inch (102 mm)/50-caliber gun; 2–8 × single 20-millimeter (0.79 in) Oerlikon anti-aircraft (AA) cannons and/or, 2–8 × 37-millimeter (1.46 in) M1 AA guns

SS Frank Flowers was a Liberty ship built in the United States during World War II. She was named after Frank Flowers, a veteran of the Spanish–American War, he served aboard Leviathan, in the supply department, during WWI, and later served as steward and purser with the United States Lines.

== Construction ==
Frank Flowers was laid down on 9 May 1945, under a Maritime Commission (MARCOM) contract, MC hull 3141, by J.A. Jones Construction, Panama City, Florida; she was launched on 22 June 1945.

== History ==
She was allocated to American Export Lines, on 16 July 1945. On 26 October 1945, she was laid up in the Hudson River Reserve Fleet, Jones Point, New York, 26 October 1945. On 21 August 1953, she was placed in the, Beaumont Reserve Fleet, Beaumont, Texas. She was sold for scrapping, 15 July 1974, to Luria Brothers and Co., Inc., for $191,889.98. She was removed from the fleet, 5 August 1974.

== Bibliography ==
- "Jones Construction, Panama City FL". www.ShipbuildingHistory.com. 13 October 2010.
- Maritime Administration. "Frank Flowers". Ship History Database Vessel Status Card. U.S. Department of Transportation, Maritime Administration.
- Davies, James (May 2004). "Specifications (As-Built)" (PDF). p. 23.
- "SS Frank Flowers".
- "THE PEOPLE BEHIND THE NAMES". Armed-guard.com.
