= John J. Esch =

American politician (1861–1941)

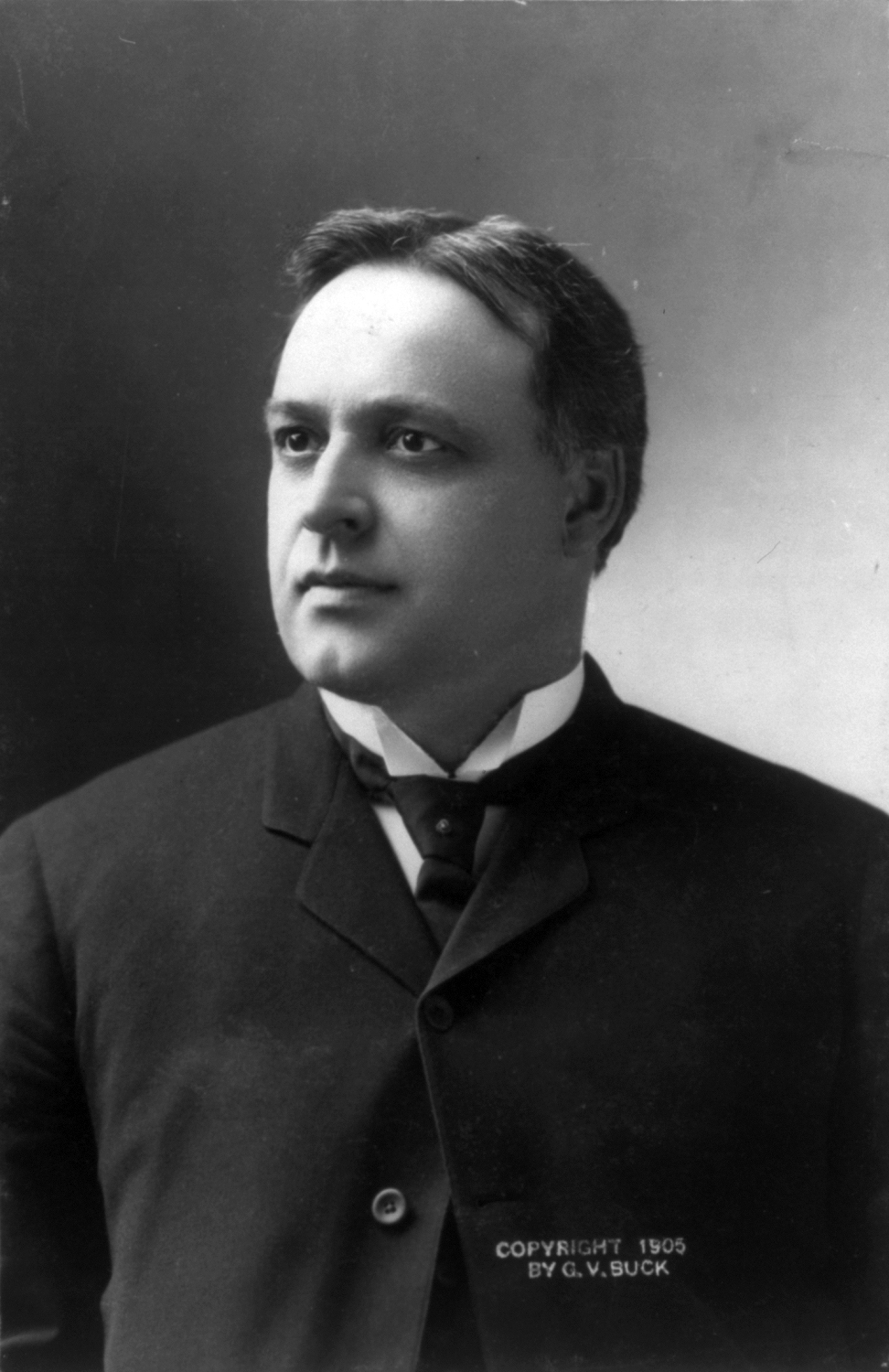

Member of the U.S. House of Representatives from Wisconsin's 7th district
- In office March 4, 1899 – March 3, 1921
- Preceded by: Michael Griffin
- Succeeded by: Joseph D. Beck

Personal details
- Born: March 20, 1861 Norwalk, Wisconsin, U.S.
- Died: April 27, 1941 (aged 80) La Crosse, Wisconsin, U.S.
- Resting place: Oak Grove Cemetery, La Crosse
- Party: Republican
- Education: University of Wisconsin
- Profession: Lawyer

John Jacob Esch (March 20, 1861 – April 27, 1941) was an American lawyer and Republican politician from La Crosse, Wisconsin. He served 22 years as a member of the U.S. House of Representatives, representing Wisconsin's 7th congressional district from 1899 to 1921. He was a member of the federal Interstate Commerce Commission from 1921 to 1927. In 1928, President Calvin Coolidge granted him a recess appointment pending his confirmation to a second term; however, the Senate blocked the nomination and the recess appointment expired when Congress adjourned in May.

== Early life ==
Esch was born near Norwalk, Wisconsin, on March 20, 1861, the son of Rev. Henry Esch and Agnes Mathilda (Menn) Esch. Reverend Esch was an immigrant from Westphalia. Soon after John's birth, Rev. Esch retired from the ministry because of poor health and entered the manufacturing trade. Esch attended the local schools, graduating from Sparta High School. He then entered the University of Wisconsin, graduating in 1882. Esch read law for a year, then taught school for three years to raise the money for formal legal training. In 1886, he returned to the University of Wisconsin, where he completed the required two years of coursework in one year, all while teaching geometry at Madison High School.

== Legal career ==
Esch was admitted to the Wisconsin Bar in 1887, and began to practice law in La Crosse, Wisconsin. He was a partner in the firm of Winter, Esch & Winter.

In 1883, Esch founded a military group he called the Sparta Rifles, which later became part of the Wisconsin National Guard, and led that company from 1883 to 1887. After he moved to La Crosse, he helped organize the Gateway City Guards, which also became part of the National Guard, and served initially as first lieutenant and later as captain of the company. In 1894, he became Acting Judge Advocate General of the Guard, appointed by Governor William H. Upham.

In 1889, Esch married Anna Herbst; they had two sons and five daughters. Esch was interested in Republican politics, becoming a delegate to the state conventions in 1894 and 1896. In 1898, he was first elected Congressman from Wisconsin's 7th congressional district.

== Congressional service ==
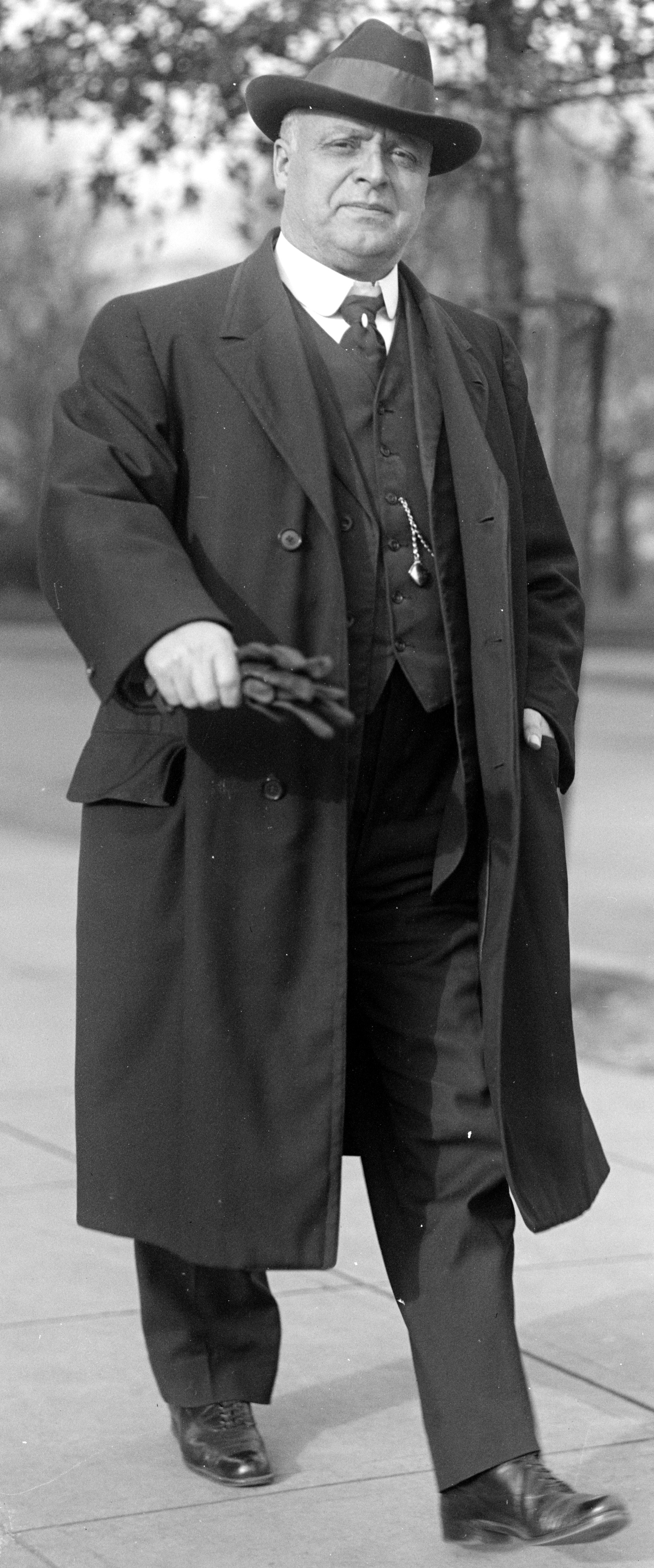
Esch in 1914

Esch served as a Congressman for 22 years, winning 11 elections before finally falling in 1920 in the Republican primary. He was first elected to the Fifty-sixth United States Congress and then to the ten succeeding Congresses. He spent his full 22 years in Congress representing Wisconsin's 7th congressional district. Initially appointed to the Committee on Public Lands and the Committee on Military Affairs, he was identified with the military legislation that followed the Spanish–American War. After six years in the House, he was appointed to the Committee on Interstate and Foreign Commerce, relinquishing his other committee posts to devote full-time to this committee. He was heavily involved in the transportation acts that followed; the Hepburn Act of 1906, which granted the Interstate Commerce Commission considerable powers over the railroads, was based heavily on an earlier bill he had submitted. His other legislative accomplishments included the Hours of Service Act, the Esch Car Service Act, the Boiler Inspection Act, the Federal Water Power Act, and the Esch-Cummins Act, also known as the Transportation Act of 1920. The last act brought him national prominence. On April 5, 1917, he voted, with 49 other representatives, against declaring war on Germany.

When Esch, defeated for re-election, left the House for the last time on March 3, 1921, it paid him an unusual honor: both sides of the House stood and cheered him as he left.

== Interstate Commerce Commission ==
On March 11, 1921, President Warren G. Harding appointed Esch to the Interstate Commerce Commission. The Senate did not act on the nomination before it recessed four days later so Harding granted Esch a recess appointment on March 21 and Esch took the oath of office on March 28, 1921. When the Senate reconvened, it confirmed Esch on April 18 by a vote of 52–3.

Esch was elected to serve as chairman of the Commission for 1927, and on December 19, 1927, Coolidge reappointed him to a second term. The Senate did not act before Esch's initial term expired at the end of 1927, so Coolidge granted Esch a recess appointment on January 3, 1928.

Esch's renomination before the Senate proved contentious. The major reason for this was a case which had come before the Commission involving Pennsylvania coalfields seeking preferential rates for the haul to Lake Erie ports. Esch initially voted in the minority, opposing the rates, but later switched his vote to the majority when the Commission reconsidered its decision. The change, and the decision, outraged Southern coal interests and their senators, who charged that Esch had switched his vote to secure his renomination by Coolidge. Esch denied any political consideration in his votes, citing new data submitted to the Commission and a Congressional resolution directing the Commission to take local economic conditions into consideration in making decisions as the reasons for his switch. The Senate rejected Esch's nomination by 39-29 on March 16, 1928, angering other commissioners, who felt that members should be able to vote their consciences without fear of political repercussions. Esch's recess appointment ended with the close of Congress's term on May 29, 1928, and he left the Commission.

== Later life ==
Esch returned to the practice of law, becoming a partner in a major Washington law firm. He served for a year as president of the Association of Practitioners Before the Interstate Commerce Commission in 1930–31 and also served on the Washington Board of Trade. Esch was President of the American Peace Society from 1930 to 1938. In 1938, he retired and returned to Wisconsin, where he died in 1941.

U.S. House of Representatives
Preceded by Michael Griffin	Member of the U.S. House of Representatives from Wisconsin's 7th congressional district March 4, 1899 – March 3, 1921	Succeeded by Joseph D. Beck
