= Frank A. McLain =

American politician (1852–1920)

Frank Alexander McLain
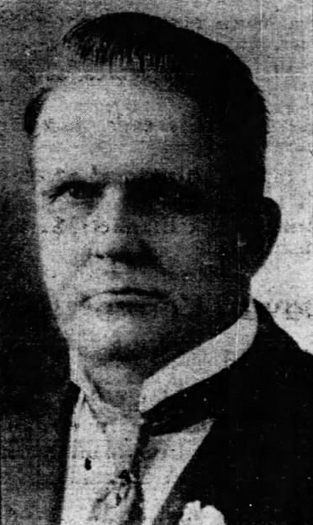

Member of the U.S. House of Representatives from Mississippi
- In office December 12, 1898 – March 3, 1909
- Preceded by: William F. Love (6th); Charles E. Hooker (7th)
- Succeeded by: Eaton J. Bowers (6th); William A. Dickson (7th)
- Constituency: 6th district (1898-1903); 7th district (1903-09)

Member of the Mississippi House of Representatives
- In office 1898–1909

Personal details
- Born: January 29, 1852 Amite County, Mississippi
- Died: October 11, 1920 (aged 68) Gloster, Mississippi
- Party: Democratic

Frank Alexander McLain (January 29, 1852 – October 11, 1920) was an American politician and lawyer. He was a U.S. representative from Mississippi from 1898 to 1909.

== Early life ==
Frank Alexander McLain was born on January 29, 1852 near Gloster in Amite County, Mississippi. He was the son of Enoch Bateman McLain and Nancy (Berryhill) McLain. Enoch served during the Civil War as a member of Nathan Bedford Forrest's cavalry. Frank McLain attended the public schools of Amite County before attending the Woodlawn Institute in East Feliciana Parish, Louisiana, for a year. He then attended the University of Mississippi at Oxford, graduating in 1874.

== Career ==
McLain then worked as a teacher and studied law in his free time. He was admitted to the bar in September 1879 and commenced practice in Liberty, Mississippi, in 1880. In November 1881 he was elected to represent Amite County for two years in the Mississippi House of Representatives, serving from 1882 to 1884. He moved to Gloster, Mississippi, in 1885. He served as district attorney for the judicial district from 1883 until January 1, 1896, when he resigned. He resumed the practice of law in Gloster, Mississippi. He served as member of the State constitutional convention in 1890.

McLain was elected as a Democrat to the Fifty-fifth Congress to fill the vacancy caused by the death of William F. Love. He was reelected to the Fifty-sixth and to the four succeeding Congresses and served from December 12, 1898, to March 3, 1909. State supreme court commissioner 1910–1912. He died in Gloster on October 11, 1920. He was interred in the City Cemetery.

== Personal life ==
McLain married Mary Ann Tyler on March 6, 1879. They had three children: Mary, Enoch Bateman, and William Hines.

U.S. House of Representatives
Preceded by William F. Love	Member of the U.S. House of Representatives from Mississippi's 6th congressional district 1898–1903	Succeeded by Eaton J. Bowers
Preceded by Charles E. Hooker	Member of the U.S. House of Representatives from Mississippi's 7th congressional district 1903–1909	Succeeded by William A. Dickson
