= Sharon, Madison County, Mississippi =

Sharon, Mississippi
- Unincorporated community
- Location within Mississippi Location within the United States
- Coordinates: 32°39′30″N 89°56′10″W
- Country: United States
- State: Mississippi
- County: Madison
- Elevation: 354 ft (108 m)
- Time zone: UTC-6 (Central (CST))
  - Summer (DST): UTC-5 (CDT)
- ZIP code: 39163
- Area code: 601
- GNIS feature ID: 677616

Sharon is an unincorporated community located on Mississippi Highway 43 in Madison County, Mississippi, United States. Sharon is approximately 12 miles (19 km) southwest of Camden and 7 miles (11 km) northeast of Canton. Sharon is located within the Jackson Metropolitan Statistical Area.

Although an unincorporated community, Sharon has a post office and zip code of 39163.

== History ==
Between 1837 and 1873, Sharon was home to an early female seminary called Sharon Female College. The community was named for the college. Sharon was also home to Madison College, founded in 1845.

In 1900, Sharon was home to three churches and had a population of 173.

== Notable people ==
- Joseph A. Baker, member of the Mississippi Senate from 1916 to 1920
- James Champlain, blind philanthropist involved in the founding of the Mississippi School for the Blind.
- K. C. Douglas, blues musician.
