= Sharon Female College =

Female college in Sharon, Mississippi

Sharon Female College was a female seminary, founded in 1837 in Sharon, Mississippi.

When the school was first created, it was run by Methodist, Presbyterian, and Baptist churches. It comprised a school for men; Sharon College, and a school for women; Sharon Female Academy. By 1843 Sharon College had closed down and the school was under the control of the Mississippi Conference of the Methodist Episcopal Church. It was reincorporated as "Sharon Female College" in February, 1846. The school averaged over 90 students per year, but most did not graduate.

The college survived the Civil War, but declined quickly after the war ended due to the economic stresses that had been put on the region. Its last class, of only three students, graduated in the Spring of 1872. By the end of 1873 the college had closed its doors.

== See also ==
- Women's colleges in the United States
- Timeline of women's colleges in the United States
