= Frank A. Flower =

Frank A. Flower

Frank Abial Flower (1854–1910) was an editor at various newspapers, an author, and government official. He wrote many history books, several related to Wisconsin and leading Republicans of his era.

== Early life ==
Frank A. Flowers was born May 11, 1854, in Cottage in Cattaraugus County, New York.

== Career ==
Flower's journalism career included being a traveling correspondent for Fredonia, New York Advertiser. He was the joint editor of the Milwaukee Evening Chronicle from September to December 1880 and the editor of the Superior Leader from 1891 to 1895.

Flower was the city statistician for Superior, Wisconsin. He worked for the State of Wisconsin as the State Labor Statistician and later became the Chief Statistician. From 1883 to 1887, he was the first Wisconsin Labor Commissioner. In 1899, he was appointed Chief of the Agricultural Division of the Census.

In 1895, Flower was the Executive Secretary for the International Deep Waterways Association, championing the improvement of cargo ship traffic from the Great Lakes with New York City. Flower said, "New-York may not want us to come down to tidewater with our unbroken cargoes of grain and merchandise, but New-York does not always know what is best for herself."

=== Liberia ===
Booker T. Washington of the Tuskegee Institute wrote to Flower in 1890 about how much it would cost to establish a school modeled after Tuskegee Institute in Liberia noting that several students from Liberia were at the existing school in Alabama. Flower was the civilian attaché with the U.S. Commission to Liberia in 1909, appointed by Secretary of State P. C. Knox because he would "be able to supply considerable information and perhaps a few suggestions, based upon his special study of African affairs". It was intended that Washington also be one of the commissioners. During a follow-up trip in 1910 to Liberia for the U.S. to research border issues, Flower died in October. It took over a month for news to even reach Liberia's capital of Monrovia.

== Bibliography ==
His book on the history of Milwaukee, Wisconsin, was published in 1881. His book on the history of the Republican Party, which started in Wisconsin, was published in 1884. His book Life of Matthew Hale Carpenter about Matthew Hale Carpenter was published by D. Atwood and Company in 1884. His book Old Abe, the Eighth Wisconsin war eagle : a full account of his capture and enlistment, exploits in war and honorable as well as useful career in peace was published by Curran and Bowen in 1885). He also published a book of reminisces related to General Herman Haupt. In 1895 his report on the proceedings of the first meeting of the International Deep Waterways Association was published. His book on Edwin McMasters Stanton was published in 1905.
