= Mississippi's 7th congressional district =

Former U.S. House district

Coordinates: 31.168549°N 91.367908°W

- Obsolete district
- Created: 1880
- Eliminated: 1950
- Years active: 1883-1953

Mississippi's 7th congressional district existed from 1883 to 1953. It was created after the 1880 census and abolished following the 1950 census.

A total of 10 representatives (all Democrats) served the district during its existence.

== Boundaries ==
The 7th congressional district boundaries included all of Amite, Claiborne, Copiah, Franklin, Jefferson, Lincoln, Pike, and Wilkinson County. It also included the western portion of modern Walthall County (included as part of Pike County at that time).

== List of members representing the district ==
| Member | Party | Years | Cong ress | Electoral history |
|---|---|---|---|---|
District created March 4, 1883
| Ethelbert Barksdale (Jackson) | Democratic | March 4, 1883 – March 3, 1887 | 48th 49th | Elected in 1882. Re-elected in 1884. Lost renomination. |
| Charles E. Hooker (Jackson) | Democratic | March 4, 1887 – March 3, 1895 | 50th 51st 52nd 53rd | Elected in 1886. Re-elected in 1888. Re-elected in 1890. Re-elected in 1892. Retired. |
| James G. Spencer (Port Gibson) | Democratic | March 4, 1895 – March 3, 1897 | 54th | Elected in 1894. Retired. |
| Patrick Henry (Brandon) | Democratic | March 4, 1897 – March 3, 1901 | 55th 56th | Elected in 1896. Re-elected in 1898. Lost renomination. |
| Charles E. Hooker (Jackson) | Democratic | March 4, 1901 – March 3, 1903 | 57th | Elected in 1900. Retired. |
| Frank A. McLain (Gloster) | Democratic | March 4, 1903 – March 3, 1909 | 58th 59th 60th | Redistricted from the 6th district and re-elected in 1902. Re-elected in 1904. Re-elected in 1906. Retired. |
| William A. Dickson (Centerville) | Democratic | March 4, 1909 – March 3, 1913 | 61st 62nd | Elected in 1908. Re-elected in 1910. Retired. |
| Percy E. Quin (McComb) | Democratic | March 4, 1913 – February 4, 1932 | 63rd 64th 65th 66th 67th 68th 69th 70th 71st 72nd | Elected in 1912. Re-elected in 1914. Re-elected in 1916. Re-elected in 1918. Re-elected in 1920. Re-elected in 1922. Re-elected in 1924. Re-elected in 1926. Re-elected in 1928. Re-elected in 1930. Died. |
| Lawrence R. Ellzey (Wesson) | Democratic | March 15, 1932 – January 3, 1935 | 72nd 73rd | Elected to finish Quin's term. Re-elected in 1932. Lost renomination. |
| Dan R. McGehee (Meadville) | Democratic | January 3, 1935 – January 3, 1947 | 74th 75th 76th 77th 78th 79th | Elected in 1934. Re-elected in 1936. Re-elected in 1938. Re-elected in 1940. Re-elected in 1942. Re-elected in 1944. Lost renomination. |
| John B. Williams (Raymond) | Democratic | January 3, 1947 – January 3, 1953 | 80th 81st 82nd | Elected in 1946. Re-elected in 1948. Re-elected in 1950. Redistricted to the 4th district. |
District eliminated January 3, 1953
