= George Hambrecht =

American politician (1871–1943)

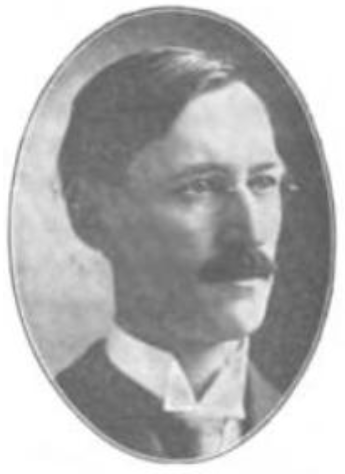

Member of the Wisconsin State Assembly
- Constituency: Wood County
- In office 1908–1910
- In office 1914–1916

Personal details
- Born: George Philip Hambrecht; February 1, 1871 Milwaukee, Wisconsin
- Died: December 23, 1943 (aged 72) Madison, Wisconsin
- Resting place: Forest Hill Cemetery
- Party: Republican
- Education: University of Wisconsin-Madison; University of Chicago; Yale Law School
- Occupation: Lawyer, politician

George Philip Hambrecht (February 1, 1871 – December 23, 1943) was a member of the Wisconsin State Assembly.

== Biography ==
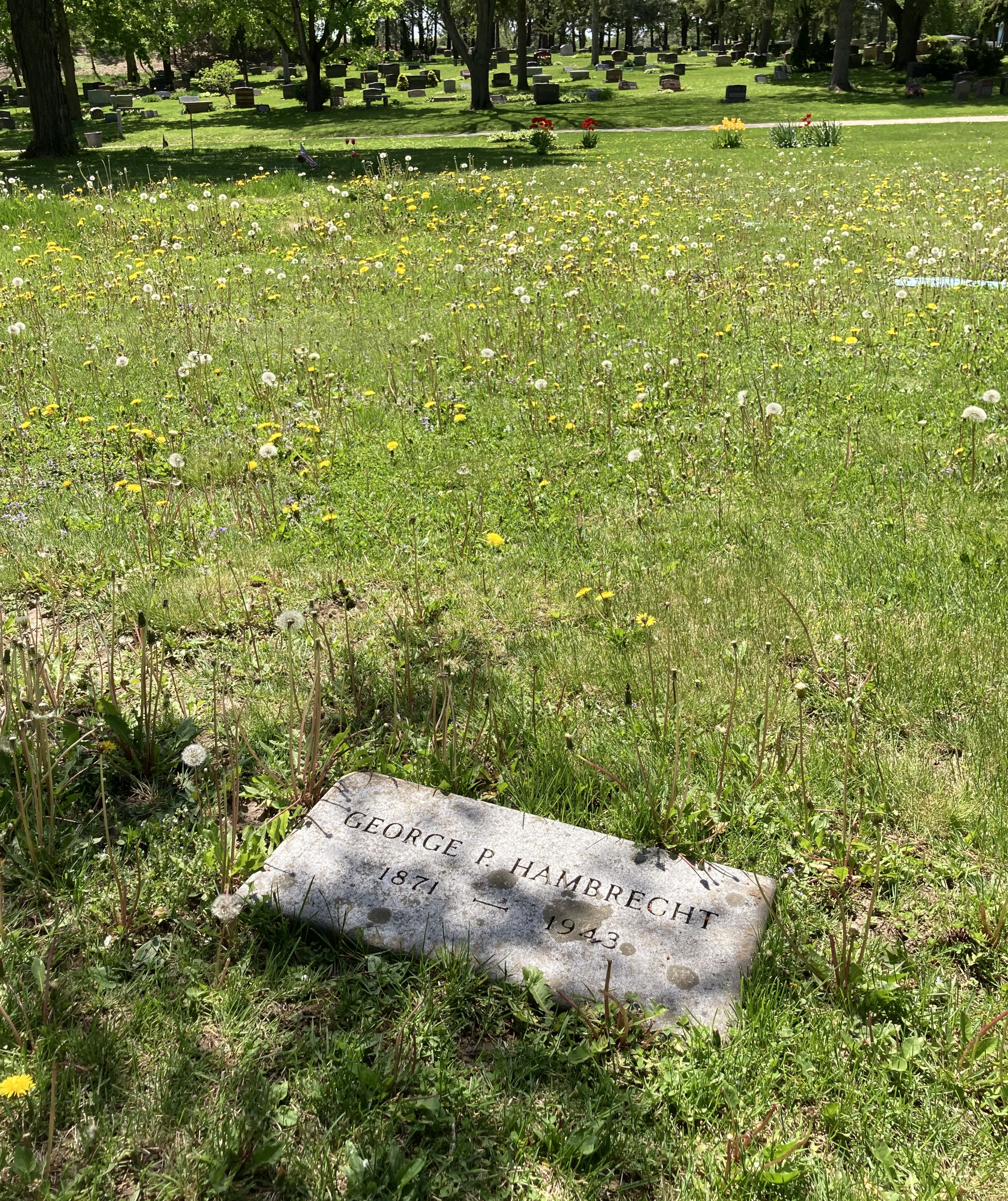
Hambrecht's grave at Forest Hill Cemetery

George Hambrecht was born in Milwaukee, Wisconsin on February 1, 1871. Later, he attended the University of Wisconsin-Madison, the University of Chicago and Yale Law School.

He died at his home in Madison on December 23, 1943. He was buried at Forest Hill Cemetery.

== Career ==
Hambrecht was a member of the Assembly from 1909 to 1910 and again in 1915. Additionally, he was the Grand Rapids, Wisconsin Superintendent of Schools from 1900 to 1902 and Chairman of the Wisconsin Industrial Commission from 1917 to 1921. He was a Republican.
