= Political party strength in Mississippi =

Politics in the US state of Mississippi

The following table indicates the party of elected officials in the U.S. state of Mississippi:

- Governor
- Lieutenant Governor
- Secretary of State
- Attorney General
- State Auditor
- State Treasurer
- Commissioner of Agriculture and Commerce
- Commissioner of Insurance
- Land Commissioner

The table also indicates the historical party composition in the:

- State Senate
- State House of Representatives
- State delegation to the United States Senate
- State delegation to the United States House of Representatives

For years in which a presidential election was held, the table indicates which party's nominees received the state's electoral votes.

== Pre-statehood (1798–1817) ==
Year	Executive offices			Territorial Legislature		U.S. Congress
Year	Governor	Secretary of State	Attorney General	Senate	House	Delegate
1798	Winthrop Sargent (F)	John Steele				
1799	Winthrop Sargent (F)	John Steele	Lyman Harding			
1800	Winthrop Sargent (F)	John Steele	Lyman Harding			
1801	Winthrop Sargent (F)	John Steele	Lyman Harding			
1801	William C. C. Claiborne (DR)	John Steele	Lyman Harding			Narsworthy Hunter (DR)
1802	William C. C. Claiborne (DR)		Lyman Harding			Thomas M. Green Jr. (DR)
1803	William C. C. Claiborne (DR)	Cato West	George Poindexter (DR)			William Lattimore (DR)
1804	William C. C. Claiborne (DR)	Cato West	George Poindexter (DR)			William Lattimore (DR)
1805	William C. C. Claiborne (DR)	Thomas Hill Williams (DR)	George Poindexter (DR)			William Lattimore (DR)
1805	Robert Williams (DR)	Thomas Hill Williams (DR)	George Poindexter (DR)			William Lattimore (DR)
1806	Robert Williams (DR)	Cowles Mead (DR)	George Poindexter (DR)			William Lattimore (DR)
1807	Robert Williams (DR)	Thomas Hill Williams (DR)				George Poindexter (DR)
1808	Robert Williams (DR)	Thomas Hill Williams (DR)				George Poindexter (DR)
1809	Robert Williams (DR)	Thomas Hill Williams (DR)				George Poindexter (DR)
1809	David Holmes (DR)	Thomas Hill Williams (DR)				George Poindexter (DR)
1810	David Holmes (DR)	Henry Dangerfield				George Poindexter (DR)
1811	David Holmes (DR)	Henry Dangerfield				George Poindexter (DR)
1812	David Holmes (DR)	Henry Dangerfield				George Poindexter (DR)
1813	David Holmes (DR)	Henry Dangerfield				William Lattimore (DR)
1814	David Holmes (DR)	Henry Dangerfield				William Lattimore (DR)
1815	David Holmes (DR)	Nathaniel A. Ware				William Lattimore (DR)
1816	David Holmes (DR)	Nathaniel A. Ware				William Lattimore (DR)
1817	David Holmes (DR)	Nathaniel A. Ware				William Lattimore (DR)
Mississippi admitted to the Union on December 10, 1817

== 1817–1873 ==
Year	Executive offices						State Legislature		United States Congress			Electoral votes
Year	Governor	Lt. Governor	Secretary of State	Attorney General	Auditor	Treasurer	Senate	House	Senator (Class I)	Senator (Class II)	House	Electoral votes
1817	David Holmes (DR) (Note: Inaugurated as the first state governor on October 7, 1817, but Mississippi did not officially become a state until December 10, 1817.)	Duncan Stewart (DR)	Daniel Williams	Lyman Harding	John R. Girault	Samuel Brooks	[?]		Walter Leake (DR)	Thomas Hill Williams (DR)	George; Poindexter (DR)	
1818	David Holmes (DR)	Duncan Stewart (DR)	Daniel Williams	Lyman Harding	John R. Girault	Peter Schuyler	[?]		Walter Leake (DR)	Thomas Hill Williams (DR)	George; Poindexter (DR)	
1819	David Holmes (DR)	Duncan Stewart (DR)	Daniel Williams	Lyman Harding	John R. Girault	Peter Schuyler	[?]		Walter Leake (DR)	Thomas Hill Williams (DR)	Christopher; Rankin (DR)	
1820	George Poindexter (DR)	James Patton (DR)	Daniel Williams	Edward Turner	John R. Girault	Peter Schuyler	[?]		Walter Leake (DR)	Thomas Hill Williams (DR)	Christopher; Rankin (DR)	Monroe/ Tompkins (DR) ✓
1820	George Poindexter (DR)	James Patton (DR)	Daniel Williams	Edward Turner	John R. Girault	Peter Schuyler	[?]		David Holmes (DR)	Thomas Hill Williams (DR)	Christopher; Rankin (DR)	Monroe/ Tompkins (DR) ✓
1821	George Poindexter (DR)	James Patton (DR)	John A. Grimball	Thomas Buck Reed (DR)	John Richards	Samuel C. Wooldridge	[?]		David Holmes (DR)	Thomas Hill Williams (DR)	Christopher; Rankin (DR)	Monroe/ Tompkins (DR) ✓
1822	Walter Leake (DR) (Note: Died in office.)	David Dickson (DR)	John A. Grimball	Thomas Buck Reed (DR)	Hiram Runnels (DR)	Samuel C. Wooldridge	[?]		David Holmes (DR)	Thomas Hill Williams (DR)	Christopher; Rankin (DR)	Monroe/ Tompkins (DR) ✓
1823	Walter Leake (DR)	David Dickson (DR)	John A. Grimball	Thomas Buck Reed (DR)	Hiram Runnels (DR)	Samuel C. Wooldridge	[?]		David Holmes (DR)	Thomas Hill Williams (DR)	Christopher; Rankin (DR)	Monroe/ Tompkins (DR) ✓
1824	Walter Leake (DR)	Gerard Brandon (DR)	John A. Grimball	Thomas Buck Reed (DR)	Hiram Runnels (DR)	Samuel C. Wooldridge	[?]		David Holmes (DR)	Thomas Hill Williams (DR)	Christopher; Rankin (DR)	Jackson (DR) ✗ / Calhoun (DR) ✓
1825	Walter Leake (DR)	Gerard Brandon (DR)	John A. Grimball	Richard Stockton	Hiram Runnels (DR)	Samuel C. Wooldridge	[?]		David Holmes (J)	Thomas Hill Williams (J)	Christopher; Rankin (J)	Jackson (DR) ✗ / Calhoun (DR) ✓
1825	Gerard Brandon (D) (Note: As lieutenant governor, filled unexpired term.)	vacant	John A. Grimball	Richard Stockton	Hiram Runnels (D)	Samuel C. Wooldridge	[?]		Powhatan Ellis (J)	Thomas Hill Williams (J)	Christopher; Rankin (J)	Jackson (DR) ✗ / Calhoun (DR) ✓
1826	David Holmes (D) (Note: Resigned due to illness.)	Gerard Brandon (D)	John A. Grimball	Richard Stockton	Hiram Runnels (D)	Samuel C. Wooldridge	[?]		Thomas Buck Reed (J)	Thomas Hill Williams (J)	Christopher; Rankin (J)	Jackson (DR) ✗ / Calhoun (DR) ✓
1826	Gerard Brandon (D)	vacant	John A. Grimball	Richard Stockton	Hiram Runnels (D)	Samuel C. Wooldridge	[?]		Thomas Buck Reed (J)	Thomas Hill Williams (J)	William; Haile (J)	Jackson (DR) ✗ / Calhoun (DR) ✓
1827	Gerard Brandon (D)	vacant	John A. Grimball	Richard Stockton	Hiram Runnels (D)	Samuel C. Wooldridge	[?]		Powhatan Ellis (J)	Thomas Hill Williams (J)	William; Haile (J)	Jackson (DR) ✗ / Calhoun (DR) ✓
1828	Gerard Brandon (D)	Abram M. Scott (NR)	John A. Grimball	George Adams (D)	Hiram Runnels (D)	James Phillips Jr.	[?]		Powhatan Ellis (J)	Thomas Hill Williams (J)	William; Haile (J)	Jackson/ Calhoun (D) ✓
1829	Gerard Brandon (D)	Abram M. Scott (NR)	John A. Grimball	Robert H. Buckner (D)	Hiram Runnels (D)	James Phillips Jr.	[?]		Powhatan Ellis (J)	Thomas Buck Reed (J)	Thomas; Hinds (J)	Jackson/ Calhoun (D) ✓
1830	Gerard Brandon (D)	Abram M. Scott (NR)	John A. Grimball	R. M. Gaines (D)	Thomas B. J. Hadley	James Phillips Jr.	[?]		Powhatan Ellis (J)	Robert H. Adams (J)	Thomas; Hinds (J)	Jackson/ Calhoun (D) ✓
1830	Gerard Brandon (D)	Abram M. Scott (NR)	John A. Grimball	R. M. Gaines (D)	Thomas B. J. Hadley	James Phillips Jr.	[?]		Powhatan Ellis (J)	George Poindexter (J)	Thomas; Hinds (J)	Jackson/ Calhoun (D) ✓
1831	Gerard Brandon (D)	Abram M. Scott (NR)	John A. Grimball	R. M. Gaines (D)	Thomas B. J. Hadley	James Phillips Jr.	[?]		Powhatan Ellis (J)	George Poindexter (NR)	Franklin E. Plummer (J)	Jackson/ Calhoun (D) ✓
1832	Abram M. Scott (NR)	Fountain Winston (D)	John A. Grimball	R. M. Gaines (D)	Thomas B. J. Hadley	James Phillips Jr.	[?]		Powhatan Ellis (J)	George Poindexter (NR)	Franklin E. Plummer (J)	Jackson/ Buren (D) ✓
1833	Abram M. Scott (NR)	no such office (Note: The office was abolished by the Constitution of 1832, and the duties of president of the Senate were incorporated into a separate office. The Constitution of 1869 re-established the office of lieutenant governor, which also re-assumed the duties of the presidency of the Senate.)	David C. Dickson (NR)	R. M. Gaines (D)	John H. Mallory	James Phillips Jr.	[?]		John Black (J)	George Poindexter (NR)	2J	Jackson/ Buren (D) ✓
1833	Charles Lynch (NR) (Note: As president of the state Senate, filled unexpired term.)	no such office	David C. Dickson (NR)	R. M. Gaines (D)	John H. Mallory	James Phillips Jr.	[?]		vacant	George Poindexter (NR)	2J	Jackson/ Buren (D) ✓
1834	Hiram Runnels (D)	no such office	David C. Dickson (NR)	M. D. Patton (D)	John H. Mallory	James Phillips Jr.	[?]		John Black (NR)	George Poindexter (NR)	2J	Jackson/ Buren (D) ✓
1835	Hiram Runnels (D)	no such office	Barry W. Benson (D)	M. D. Patton (D)	John H. Mallory	James Phillips Jr.	[?]		John Black (NR)	Robert J. Walker (J)	1J, 1NR	Jackson/ Buren (D) ✓
1835	John A. Quitman (W)	no such office	Barry W. Benson (D)	M. D. Patton (D)	John H. Mallory	James Phillips Jr.	[?]		John Black (NR)	Robert J. Walker (J)	1J, 1NR	Jackson/ Buren (D) ✓
1836	Charles Lynch (W)	no such office	Barry W. Benson (D)	M. D. Patton (D)	John H. Mallory	Charles C. Mayson	[?]		John Black (NR)	Robert J. Walker (J)	2J	Buren/ Johnson (D) ✓
1837	Charles Lynch (W)	no such office	Barry W. Benson (D)	T. F. Collins (D)	A. B. Saunders	Charles C. Mayson	[?]		John Black (W)	Robert J. Walker (D)	2D	Buren/ Johnson (D) ✓
1838	Alexander McNutt (D)	no such office	Barry W. Benson (D)	T. F. Collins (D)	A. B. Saunders	James Phillips Jr.	17D, 13W	53D, 36W, 1?	James F. Trotter (D)	Robert J. Walker (D)	2W	Buren/ Johnson (D) ✓
1838	Alexander McNutt (D)	no such office	Barry W. Benson (D)	T. F. Collins (D)	A. B. Saunders	J. A. Vanhoesen	17D, 13W	53D, 36W, 1?	Thomas Hickman Williams (D)	Robert J. Walker (D)	2W	Buren/ Johnson (D) ✓
1839	Alexander McNutt (D)	no such office	Thomas B. Woodward (D)	T. F. Collins (D)	A. B. Saunders	Silas Brown	17D, 13W	53D, 36W, 1?	John Henderson (W)	Robert J. Walker (D)	2D	Buren/ Johnson (D) ✓
1839	Alexander McNutt (D)	no such office	Thomas B. Woodward (D)	T. F. Collins (D)	A. B. Saunders	S. Craig	17D, 13W	53D, 36W, 1?	John Henderson (W)	Robert J. Walker (D)	2D	Buren/ Johnson (D) ✓
1839	Alexander McNutt (D)	no such office	Thomas B. Woodward (D)	T. F. Collins (D)	A. B. Saunders	James G. Williams	17D, 13W	53D, 36W, 1?	John Henderson (W)	Robert J. Walker (D)	2D	Buren/ Johnson (D) ✓
1840	Alexander McNutt (D)	no such office	Thomas B. Woodward (D)	T. F. Collins (D)	A. B. Saunders	Joshua S. Curtis	18D, 12W	54D, 36W, 1?	John Henderson (W)	Robert J. Walker (D)	2D	Harrison/ Tyler (W) ✓
1841	Alexander McNutt (D)	no such office	L. G. Galloway (W)	John D. Freeman (D)	A. B. Saunders	Richard S. Graves	18D, 12W	54D, 36W, 1?	John Henderson (W)	Robert J. Walker (D)	2D	Harrison/ Tyler (W) ✓
1842	Tilghman Tucker (D)	no such office	L. G. Galloway (W)	John D. Freeman (D)	J. E. Matthews	Richard S. Graves	21D, 11W	60D, 38W	John Henderson (W)	Robert J. Walker (D)	2D	Harrison/ Tyler (W) ✓
1843	Tilghman Tucker (D)	no such office	Wilson Hemingway	John D. Freeman (D)	J. E. Matthews	William Clark	21D, 11W	60D, 38W	John Henderson (W)	Robert J. Walker (D)	4D	Harrison/ Tyler (W) ✓
1844	Albert G. Brown (D)	no such office	Wilson Hemingway	John D. Freeman (D)	J. E. Matthews	William Clark	20D, 12W	66D, 32W, 1?	John Henderson (W)	Robert J. Walker (D)	4D	Polk/ Dallas (D) ✓
1845	Albert G. Brown (D)	no such office	Wilson Hemingway	John D. Freeman (D)	J. E. Matthews	William Clark	20D, 12W	66D, 32W, 1?	Jesse Speight (D)	Joseph W. Chalmers (D)	4D	Polk/ Dallas (D) ✓
1846	Albert G. Brown (D)	no such office	Wilson Hemingway	John D. Freeman (D)	J. E. Matthews	William Clark	23D, 9W	70D, 29W	Jesse Speight (D)	Joseph W. Chalmers (D)	4D	Polk/ Dallas (D) ✓
1847	Albert G. Brown (D)	no such office	Samuel Stamps (D)	John D. Freeman (D)	George T. Swann (D)	Richard Griffith (D)	23D, 9W	70D, 29W	Jesse Speight (D)	Henry S. Foote (D)	3D, 1W	Polk/ Dallas (D) ✓
1847	Albert G. Brown (D)	no such office	Samuel Stamps (D)	John D. Freeman (D)	George T. Swann (D)	Richard Griffith (D)	23D, 9W	70D, 29W	Jefferson Davis (D)	Henry S. Foote (D)	3D, 1W	Polk/ Dallas (D) ✓
1848	Joseph W. Matthews (D)	no such office	Samuel Stamps (D)	John D. Freeman (D)	George T. Swann (D)	Richard Griffith (D)	25D, 7W	73D, 25W, 1?	Jefferson Davis (D)	Henry S. Foote (D)	3D, 1W	Cass/ Butler (D) ✗
1849	Joseph W. Matthews (D)	no such office	Samuel Stamps (D)	John D. Freeman (D)	George T. Swann (D)	Richard Griffith (D)	25D, 7W	73D, 25W, 1?	Jefferson Davis (D)	Henry S. Foote (D)	4D	Cass/ Butler (D) ✗
1850	John A. Quitman (D) (Note: Resigned following an arrest for violating neutrality laws by assisting with the liberation of Cuba. He was found not guilty, but the political fallout led to his resignation.)	no such office	Joseph Bell (D)	John D. Freeman (D)	George T. Swann (D)	Richard Griffith (D)	20D, 10W, 2?	62D, 36W, 1?	Jefferson Davis (D)	Henry S. Foote (D)	4D	Cass/ Butler (D) ✗
1851	John Isaac Guion (D) (Note: As president of the Senate, filled term until his Senate term expired.)	no such office	Joseph Bell (D)	John D. Freeman (D)	Daniel R. Russell	William Clark	20D, 10W, 2?	62D, 36W, 1?	Jefferson Davis (D)	Henry S. Foote (D)	3U, 1D	Cass/ Butler (D) ✗
1851	James Whitfield (D)	no such office	Joseph Bell (D)	John D. Freeman (D)	Daniel R. Russell	William Clark	20D, 10W, 2?	62D, 36W, 1?	Jefferson Davis (D)	Henry S. Foote (D)	3U, 1D	Cass/ Butler (D) ✗
1852	Henry S. Foote (UD) (Note: Resigned due to political tension over secession.)	no such office	James A. Horne (U)	John D. Freeman (U)	Daniel R. Russell	William Clark	21SR, 11U	63SR, 35U, 1?	John J. McRae (D)	Walker Brooke (W)	3U, 1D	Pierce/ King (D) ✓
1852	Henry S. Foote (UD)	no such office	James A. Horne (U)	John D. Freeman (U)	Daniel R. Russell	William Clark	21SR, 11U	63SR, 35U, 1?	Stephen Adams (D)	Walker Brooke (W)	3U, 1D	Pierce/ King (D) ✓
1853	Henry S. Foote (UD)	no such office	James A. Horne (U)	David C. Glenn (D)	Daniel R. Russell	William Clark	21SR, 11U	63SR, 35U, 1?	Stephen Adams (D)	Walker Brooke (W)	5D	Pierce/ King (D) ✓
1854	John J. Pettus (D)	no such office	William H. Muse (D)	David C. Glenn (D)	Daniel R. Russell	Shields L. Hussey	20D, 10W, 1U	97D, 19W, 8U, 2?	Stephen Adams (D)	Albert G. Brown (D)	5D	Pierce/ King (D) ✓
1854	John J. McRae (D)	no such office	William H. Muse (D)	David C. Glenn (D)	Daniel R. Russell	Shields L. Hussey	20D, 10W, 1U	97D, 19W, 8U, 2?	Stephen Adams (D)	Albert G. Brown (D)	5D	Pierce/ King (D) ✓
1855	John J. McRae (D)	no such office	A. B. Dilworth (D)	David C. Glenn (D)	Madison McAfee	Shields L. Hussey	20D, 10W, 1U	97D, 19W, 8U, 2?	Stephen Adams (D)	Albert G. Brown (D)	4D, 1KN	Pierce/ King (D) ✓
1856	John J. McRae (D)	no such office	A. B. Dilworth (D)	David C. Glenn (D)	Madison McAfee	Shields L. Hussey	[?]	[?]	Stephen Adams (D)	Albert G. Brown (D)	4D, 1KN	Buchanan/ Breckinridge (D) ✓
1857	John J. McRae (D)	no such office	A. B. Dilworth (D)	T. J. Wharton (D)	Madison McAfee	Shields L. Hussey	[?]	[?]	Jefferson Davis (D)	Albert G. Brown (D)	5D	Buchanan/ Breckinridge (D) ✓
1857	William McWillie (D)	no such office	A. B. Dilworth (D)	T. J. Wharton (D)	Madison McAfee	Shields L. Hussey	[?]	[?]	Jefferson Davis (D)	Albert G. Brown (D)	5D	Buchanan/ Breckinridge (D) ✓
1858	William McWillie (D)	no such office	A. B. Dilworth (D)	T. J. Wharton (D)	Madison McAfee	Shields L. Hussey	[?]	85D, 19O	Jefferson Davis (D)	Albert G. Brown (D)	5D	Buchanan/ Breckinridge (D) ✓
1859	William McWillie (D)	no such office	A. B. Dilworth (D)	T. J. Wharton (D)	Erasmus Burt (D)	Shields L. Hussey	[?]	85D, 19O	Jefferson Davis (D)	Albert G. Brown (D)	5D	Buchanan/ Breckinridge (D) ✓
1859	John J. Pettus (D)	no such office	A. B. Dilworth (D)	T. J. Wharton (D)	Erasmus Burt (D)	Shields L. Hussey	[?]	85D, 19O	Jefferson Davis (D)	Albert G. Brown (D)	5D	Buchanan/ Breckinridge (D) ✓
1860	John J. Pettus (D)	no such office	B. R. Webb	T. J. Wharton (D)	Erasmus Burt (D)	M. D. Haynes	27D, 4O	86D, 14O	Jefferson Davis (D)	Albert G. Brown (D)	5D	Breckinridge/ Lane (SD) ✗
1861	John J. Pettus (D)	no such office	C. A. Brougher	T. J. Wharton (D)	A. B. Dilworth (D)	M. D. Haynes	27D, 4O	86D, 14O	Civil War/Reconstruction			Breckinridge/ Lane (SD) ✗
1862	John J. Pettus (D)	no such office	C. A. Brougher	T. J. Wharton (D)	A. J. Gillespie	M. D. Haynes	[?]		Civil War/Reconstruction			Breckinridge/ Lane (SD) ✗
1863	John J. Pettus (D)	no such office	C. A. Brougher	T. J. Wharton (D)	A. J. Gillespie	M. D. Haynes	[?]		Civil War/Reconstruction			Breckinridge/ Lane (SD) ✗
1863	Charles Clark (D) (Note: Term effectively ended when he was arrested by Union forces.)	no such office	C. A. Brougher	T. J. Wharton (D)	A. J. Gillespie	M. D. Haynes	[?]		Civil War/Reconstruction			Breckinridge/ Lane (SD) ✗
1864	Charles Clark (D)	no such office	C. A. Brougher	T. J. Wharton (D)	A. J. Gillespie	M. D. Haynes	[?]		Civil War/Reconstruction			
1865	Charles Clark (D)	no such office	Alexander Warner (R)	Charles E. Hooker (D)	Thomas T. Swann	W. B. Weaver	[?]		Civil War/Reconstruction			
1865	William L. Sharkey (NP) (Note: Appointed as provisional governor by President Andrew Johnson following the end of the American Civil War.)	no such office	Alexander Warner (R)	Charles E. Hooker (D)	Thomas T. Swann	W. B. Weaver	[?]		Civil War/Reconstruction			
1865	Benjamin G. Humphreys (D) (Note: Forced to resign and physically removed from office by federal forces after his government failed to comply with Reconstruction.)	no such office	C. A. Brougher	Charles E. Hooker (D)	Thomas T. Swann	John H. Echols	[?]		Civil War/Reconstruction			
1866	Benjamin G. Humphreys (D)	no such office	C. A. Brougher	Charles E. Hooker (D)	Thomas T. Swann	John H. Echols	17W, 13D, 1?	52W, 39D, 7 other	Civil War/Reconstruction			
1867	Benjamin G. Humphreys (D)	no such office	C. A. Brougher	Charles E. Hooker (D)	Thomas T. Swann	John H. Echols	17W, 13D, 1?	52W, 39D, 7 other	Civil War/Reconstruction			
1868	Benjamin G. Humphreys (D)	no such office	C. A. Brougher	Charles E. Hooker (D)	Thomas T. Swann	John H. Echols	17W, 13D, 1?	52W, 39D, 7 other	Civil War/Reconstruction			
1868	Adelbert Ames (M) (Note: Left office as Reconstruction ended.)	no such office	C. A. Brougher	Jasper Myers (D)	Thomas T. Swann	John H. Echols	17W, 13D, 1?	52W, 39D, 7 other	Civil War/Reconstruction			
1869	Adelbert Ames (M)	no such office	Henry Musgrove (R)	Jasper Myers (D)	Henry Musgrove (R)	William H. Vassar	17W, 13D, 1?	52W, 39D, 7 other	Civil War/Reconstruction			
1870	Adelbert Ames (M)	no such office	James D. Lynch (R)	Joshua S. Morris (R)	Henry Musgrove (R)	William H. Vassar	26R, 7D	82R, 25D	Adelbert Ames (R)	Hiram R. Revels (R)	5R	
1870	James L. Alcorn (R) (Note: Resigned to take an elected seat in the United States Senate; Alcorn's senate term began March 4, 1871 but he delayed taking it, preferring to continue as governor.)	Ridgley C. Powers (R)	James D. Lynch (R)	Joshua S. Morris (R)	Henry Musgrove (R)	William H. Vassar	26R, 7D	82R, 25D	Adelbert Ames (R)	Hiram R. Revels (R)	5R	
1871	James L. Alcorn (R)	Ridgley C. Powers (R)	James D. Lynch (R)	Joshua S. Morris (R)	Henry Musgrove (R)	William H. Vassar	26R, 7D	82R, 25D	Adelbert Ames (R)	Hiram R. Revels (R)	5R	
1872	Ridgley C. Powers (R)	Alexander Kelso Davis (R)	Hiram R. Revels (R)	Joshua S. Morris (R)	Henry Musgrove (R)	William H. Vassar	23R, 14D	65R, 50D	Adelbert Ames (R)	James L. Alcorn (R)	5R	Grant/ Wilson (R) ✓
1873	Ridgley C. Powers (R)	Alexander Kelso Davis (R)	Hannibal C. Carter (R)	Joshua S. Morris (R)	Henry Musgrove (R)	William H. Vassar	23R, 14D	65R, 50D	Adelbert Ames (R)	James L. Alcorn (R)	5R, 1D	Grant/ Wilson (R) ✓
1873	Ridgley C. Powers (R)	Alexander Kelso Davis (R)	M. M. McLeod (R)	Joshua S. Morris (R)	Henry Musgrove (R)	William H. Vassar	23R, 14D	65R, 50D	Adelbert Ames (R)	James L. Alcorn (R)	5R, 1D	Grant/ Wilson (R) ✓

== 1873–1979 ==
Year	Executive offices									State Legislature		United States Congress			Electoral votes
Year	Governor	Lt. Governor	Secretary of State	Attorney General	Auditor	Treasurer	Comm. of Ag. and Commerce	Comm. of Ins.	Land Comm.	Senate	House	Senator (Class I)	Senator (Class II)	House	Electoral votes
1874	Adelbert Ames (R) (Note: Impeached; made a deal with the state legislature to resign, and all charges were dropped.)	Alexander Kelso Davis (R)	James Hill (R)	George E. Harris (R)	William H. Gibbs	George H. Holland (R)	no such office	no such office	no such office	23R, 14D	68R, 44D, 3 vac.	Henry R. Pease (R)	James L. Alcorn (R)	5R, 1D	
1875	Adelbert Ames (R)	Alexander Kelso Davis (R)	James Hill (R)	George E. Harris (R)	William H. Gibbs	M. L. Holland	no such office	no such office	no such office	23R, 14D	68R, 44D, 3 vac.	Blanche Bruce (R)	James L. Alcorn (R)	4D, 2R	
1876	Adelbert Ames (R)	Alexander Kelso Davis (R)	James Hill (R)	George E. Harris (R)	William H. Gibbs	William L. Hemingway	no such office	no such office	no such office	25D, 11R, 1IR	97D, 19R	Blanche Bruce (R)	James L. Alcorn (R)	4D, 2R	Tilden/ Hendricks (D) ✗
1876	John Marshall Stone (D) (Note: Since both the Governor and Lieutenant Governor had been impeached, the former resigning and the latter being removed from office, Stone, as president of the Senate, was next in line for the governorship. Filled unexpired term and was later elected in his own right.)	vacant	James Hill (R)	George E. Harris (R)	William H. Gibbs	William L. Hemingway	no such office	no such office	no such office	25D, 11R, 1IR	97D, 19R	Blanche Bruce (R)	James L. Alcorn (R)	4D, 2R	Tilden/ Hendricks (D) ✗
1877	John Marshall Stone (D)	vacant	James Hill (R)	George E. Harris (R)	William H. Gibbs	William L. Hemingway	no such office	no such office	John M. Smylie	25D, 11R, 1IR	97D, 19R	Blanche Bruce (R)	Lucius Q. C. Lamar (D)	6D	Tilden/ Hendricks (D) ✗
1878	John Marshall Stone (D)	William H. Sims (D)	Kinloch Falconer (D)	Thomas C. Catchings (D)	Sylvester Gwin (D)	William L. Hemingway	no such office	no such office	John M. Smylie	36D, 2R	109D, 8R, 3Fus	Blanche Bruce (R)	Lucius Q. C. Lamar (D)	6D	Tilden/ Hendricks (D) ✗
1878	John Marshall Stone (D)	William H. Sims (D)	D. P. Porter (D)	Thomas C. Catchings (D)	Sylvester Gwin (D)	William L. Hemingway	no such office	no such office	John M. Smylie	36D, 2R	109D, 8R, 3Fus	Blanche Bruce (R)	Lucius Q. C. Lamar (D)	6D	Tilden/ Hendricks (D) ✗
1879	John Marshall Stone (D)	William H. Sims (D)	Henry C. Myers (D)	Thomas C. Catchings (D)	Sylvester Gwin (D)	William L. Hemingway	no such office	no such office	John M. Smylie	36D, 2R	109D, 8R, 3Fus	Blanche Bruce (R)	Lucius Q. C. Lamar (D)	6D	Tilden/ Hendricks (D) ✗
1880	John Marshall Stone (D)	William H. Sims (D)	Henry C. Myers (D)	Thomas C. Catchings (D)	Sylvester Gwin (D)	William L. Hemingway	no such office	no such office	John M. Smylie	35D, 2G, 1R	101D, 14G, 5R	Blanche Bruce (R)	Lucius Q. C. Lamar (D)	6D	Hancock/ English (D) ✗
1881	John Marshall Stone (D)	William H. Sims (D)	Henry C. Myers (D)	Thomas C. Catchings (D)	Sylvester Gwin (D)	William L. Hemingway	no such office	no such office	John M. Smylie	35D, 2G, 1R	101D, 14G, 5R	James Z. George (D)	Lucius Q. C. Lamar (D)	6D	Hancock/ English (D) ✗
1882	Robert Lowry (D)	G. D. Shands (D)	Henry C. Myers (D)	Thomas C. Catchings (D)	Sylvester Gwin (D)	William L. Hemingway	no such office	no such office	John M. Smylie	35D, 2R	100D, 15R, 3ID, 2GB	James Z. George (D)	Lucius Q. C. Lamar (D)	5D, 1R	Hancock/ English (D) ✗
1883	Robert Lowry (D)	G. D. Shands (D)	Henry C. Myers (D)	Thomas C. Catchings (D)	Sylvester Gwin (D)	William L. Hemingway	no such office	no such office	John M. Smylie	35D, 2R	100D, 15R, 3ID, 2GB	James Z. George (D)	Lucius Q. C. Lamar (D)	5D, 1R, 1I	Hancock/ English (D) ✗
1884	Robert Lowry (D)	G. D. Shands (D)	Henry C. Myers (D)	Thomas C. Catchings (D)	Sylvester Gwin (D)	William L. Hemingway	no such office	no such office	P. M. Doherty (D)	33D, 3R, 1I	100D, 13R, 4GB, 3I	James Z. George (D)	Lucius Q. C. Lamar (D)	5D, 1R, 1I	Cleveland/ Hendricks (D) ✓
1885	Robert Lowry (D)	G. D. Shands (D)	Henry C. Myers (D)	Thomas S. Ford (D)	Sylvester Gwin (D)	William L. Hemingway	no such office	no such office	P. M. Doherty (D)	33D, 3R, 1I	100D, 13R, 4GB, 3I	James Z. George (D)	Edward C. Walthall (D)	7D	Cleveland/ Hendricks (D) ✓
1886	Robert Lowry (D)	G. D. Shands (D)	George M. Govan (D)	T. Marshall Miller (D)	W. W. Stone (D)	William L. Hemingway	no such office	no such office	John R. Enochs (D)	39D, 1R	119D, 9R, 2I	James Z. George (D)	Edward C. Walthall (D)	7D	Cleveland/ Hendricks (D) ✓
1887	Robert Lowry (D)	G. D. Shands (D)	George M. Govan (D)	T. Marshall Miller (D)	W. W. Stone (D)	William L. Hemingway	no such office	no such office	John R. Enochs (D)	39D, 1R	119D, 9R, 2I	James Z. George (D)	Edward C. Walthall (D)	7D	Cleveland/ Hendricks (D) ✓
1888	Robert Lowry (D)	G. D. Shands (D)	George M. Govan (D)	T. Marshall Miller (D)	W. W. Stone (D)	William L. Hemingway	no such office	no such office	J. W. McMaster (D)	40D	111D, 7R, 2I	James Z. George (D)	Edward C. Walthall (D)	7D	Cleveland/ Thurman (D) ✗
1889	Robert Lowry (D)	G. D. Shands (D)	George M. Govan (D)	T. Marshall Miller (D)	W. W. Stone (D)	William L. Hemingway	no such office	no such office	J. W. McMaster (D)	40D	111D, 7R, 2I	James Z. George (D)	Edward C. Walthall (D)	7D	Cleveland/ Thurman (D) ✗
1890	John Marshall Stone (D)	M. M. Evans (D)	George M. Govan (D)	T. Marshall Miller (D)	W. W. Stone (D)	J. J. Evans (D)	no such office	no such office	Edgar S. Wilson (D)	40D	113D, 7R	James Z. George (D)	Edward C. Walthall (D)	7D	Cleveland/ Thurman (D) ✗
1891	John Marshall Stone (D)	M. M. Evans (D)	George M. Govan (D)	T. Marshall Miller (D)	W. W. Stone (D)	J. J. Evans (D)	no such office	no such office	Edgar S. Wilson (D)	40D	113D, 7R	James Z. George (D)	Edward C. Walthall (D)	7D	Cleveland/ Thurman (D) ✗
1892	John Marshall Stone (D)	M. M. Evans (D)	George M. Govan (D)	T. Marshall Miller (D)	W. W. Stone (D)	J. J. Evans (D)	no such office	no such office	Edgar S. Wilson (D)	45D	129D, 3R, 1I	James Z. George (D)	Edward C. Walthall (D)	7D	Cleveland/ Stevenson (D) ✓
1893	John Marshall Stone (D)	M. M. Evans (D)	George M. Govan (D)	Frank Johnston (D)	W. W. Stone (D)	J. J. Evans (D)	no such office	no such office	Edgar S. Wilson (D)	45D	129D, 3R, 1I	James Z. George (D)	Edward C. Walthall (D)	7D	Cleveland/ Stevenson (D) ✓
1894	John Marshall Stone (D)	M. M. Evans (D)	George M. Govan (D)	Frank Johnston (D)	W. W. Stone (D)	J. J. Evans (D)	no such office	no such office	Edgar S. Wilson (D)	45D	129D, 3R, 1I	James Z. George (D)	Anselm J. McLaurin (D)	7D	Cleveland/ Stevenson (D) ✓
1895	John Marshall Stone (D)	M. M. Evans (D)	George M. Govan (D)	Frank Johnston (D)	W. W. Stone (D)	J. J. Evans (D)	no such office	no such office	Edgar S. Wilson (D)	45D	129D, 3R, 1I	James Z. George (D)	Edward C. Walthall (D)	7D	Cleveland/ Stevenson (D) ✓
1896	Anselm J. McLaurin (D)	J. H. Jones (D)	John Logan Power (D)	William N. Nash (D)	W. D. Holder (D)	A. Q. May (D)	no such office	no such office	John M. Simonton (D)	45D	131D, 2R	James Z. George (D)	Edward C. Walthall (D)	7D	Bryan/ Sewall (D) ✓
1897	Anselm J. McLaurin (D)	J. H. Jones (D)	John Logan Power (D)	William N. Nash (D)	W. D. Holder (D)	A. Q. May (D)	no such office	no such office	John M. Simonton (D)	45D	131D, 2R	Hernando Money (D)	Edward C. Walthall (D)	7D	Bryan/ Sewall (D) ✓
1898	Anselm J. McLaurin (D)	J. H. Jones (D)	John Logan Power (D)	William N. Nash (D)	W. D. Holder (D)	A. Q. May (D)	no such office	no such office	Edwin H. Nall (D)	45D	131D, 2R	Hernando Money (D)	Edward C. Walthall (D)	7D	Bryan/ Sewall (D) ✓
1898	Anselm J. McLaurin (D)	J. H. Jones (D)	John Logan Power (D)	William N. Nash (D)	W. D. Holder (D)	A. Q. May (D)	no such office	no such office	Edwin H. Nall (D)	45D	131D, 2R	Hernando Money (D)	William V. Sullivan (D)	7D	Bryan/ Sewall (D) ✓
1899	Anselm J. McLaurin (D)	J. H. Jones (D)	John Logan Power (D)	William N. Nash (D)	W. D. Holder (D)	A. Q. May (D)	no such office	no such office	Edwin H. Nall (D)	45D	131D, 2R	Hernando Money (D)	William V. Sullivan (D)	7D	Bryan/ Sewall (D) ✓
1900	Andrew H. Longino (D)	James T. Harrison (D)	John Logan Power (D)	Monroe McClurg (D)	William Q. Cole (D)	J. R. Stowers (D)	no such office	no such office	Edwin H. Nall (D)	45D	131D, 2R	Hernando Money (D)	William V. Sullivan (D)	7D	Bryan/ Stevenson (D) ✗
1901	Andrew H. Longino (D)	James T. Harrison (D)	Joseph Withers Power (D)	Monroe McClurg (D)	William Q. Cole (D)	George W. Carlisle (D)	no such office	no such office	Edwin H. Nall (D)	45D	131D, 2R	Hernando Money (D)	Anselm J. McLaurin (D)	7D	Bryan/ Stevenson (D) ✗
1902	Andrew H. Longino (D)	James T. Harrison (D)	Joseph Withers Power (D)	Monroe McClurg (D)	William Q. Cole (D)	Thad B. Lampton (D)	no such office	William Q. Cole (D)	Edwin H. Nall (D)	45D	131D, 2R	Hernando Money (D)	Anselm J. McLaurin (D)	7D	Bryan/ Stevenson (D) ✗
1903	Andrew H. Longino (D)	James T. Harrison (D)	Joseph Withers Power (D)	William Williams (D)	William Q. Cole (D)	Thad B. Lampton (D)	no such office	William Q. Cole (D)	Edwin H. Nall (D)	45D	131D, 2R	Hernando Money (D)	Anselm J. McLaurin (D)	8D	Bryan/ Stevenson (D) ✗
1904	James K. Vardaman (D)	John Prentiss Carter (D)	Joseph Withers Power (D)	William Williams (D)	Thomas Monroe Henry (D)	William J. Miller (D)	no such office	William Q. Cole (D)	Edwin H. Nall (D)	45D	133D	Hernando Money (D)	Anselm J. McLaurin (D)	8D	Parker/ Davis (D) ✗
1905	James K. Vardaman (D)	John Prentiss Carter (D)	Joseph Withers Power (D)	William Williams (D)	Thomas Monroe Henry (D)	William J. Miller (D)	no such office	William Q. Cole (D)	Edwin H. Nall (D)	45D	133D	Hernando Money (D)	Anselm J. McLaurin (D)	8D	Parker/ Davis (D) ✗
1906	James K. Vardaman (D)	John Prentiss Carter (D)	Joseph Withers Power (D)	William Williams (D)	Thomas Monroe Henry (D)	William J. Miller (D)	Henry E. Blakeslee (D)	William Q. Cole (D)	Edwin H. Nall (D)	45D	133D	Hernando Money (D)	Anselm J. McLaurin (D)	8D	Parker/ Davis (D) ✗
1907	James K. Vardaman (D)	John Prentiss Carter (D)	Joseph Withers Power (D)	Robert Virgil Fletcher (D)	Thomas Monroe Henry (D)	William J. Miller (D)	Henry E. Blakeslee (D)	William Q. Cole (D)	Edwin H. Nall (D)	45D	133D	Hernando Money (D)	Anselm J. McLaurin (D)	8D	Parker/ Davis (D) ✗
1908	Edmond Noel (D)	Luther Manship (D)	Joseph Withers Power (D)	J. Bowman Sterling (D)	Elias J. Smith (D)	George R. Edwards (D)	Henry E. Blakeslee (D)	Thomas Monroe Henry (D)	Edwin H. Nall (D)	45D	133D	Hernando Money (D)	Anselm J. McLaurin (D)	8D	Bryan/ Kern (D) ✗
1909	Edmond Noel (D)	Luther Manship (D)	Joseph Withers Power (D)	J. Bowman Sterling (D)	Elias J. Smith (D)	George R. Edwards (D)	Henry E. Blakeslee (D)	Thomas Monroe Henry (D)	James L. Gillespie (D)	45D	133D	Hernando Money (D)	Anselm J. McLaurin (D)	8D	Bryan/ Kern (D) ✗
1910	Edmond Noel (D)	Luther Manship (D)	Joseph Withers Power (D)	Shepherd S. Hudson (D)	Elias J. Smith (D)	George R. Edwards (D)	Henry E. Blakeslee (D)	Thomas Monroe Henry (D)	James L. Gillespie (D)	45D	133D	Hernando Money (D)	James Gordon (D)	8D	Bryan/ Kern (D) ✗
1910	Edmond Noel (D)	Luther Manship (D)	Joseph Withers Power (D)	Shepherd S. Hudson (D)	Elias J. Smith (D)	George R. Edwards (D)	Henry E. Blakeslee (D)	Thomas Monroe Henry (D)	James L. Gillespie (D)	45D	133D	Hernando Money (D)	LeRoy Percy (D)	8D	Bryan/ Kern (D) ✗
1911	Edmond Noel (D)	Luther Manship (D)	Joseph Withers Power (D)	Shepherd S. Hudson (D)	Elias J. Smith (D)	George R. Edwards (D)	Henry E. Blakeslee (D)	Thomas Monroe Henry (D)	James L. Gillespie (D)	45D	133D	John Sharp Williams (D)	LeRoy Percy (D)	8D	Bryan/ Kern (D) ✗
1912	Earl L. Brewer (D)	Theodore G. Bilbo (D)	Joseph Withers Power (D)	Ross A. Collins (D)	Duncan L. Thompson (D)	Peter Simpson Stovall (D)	Henry E. Blakeslee (D)	Thomas Monroe Henry (D)	Mark A. Brown (D)	45D	133D	John Sharp Williams (D)	LeRoy Percy (D)	8D	Wilson/ Marshall (D) ✓
1913	Earl L. Brewer (D)	Theodore G. Bilbo (D)	Joseph Withers Power (D)	Ross A. Collins (D)	Duncan L. Thompson (D)	Peter Simpson Stovall (D)	Henry E. Blakeslee (D)	Thomas Monroe Henry (D)	Mark A. Brown (D)	45D	133D	John Sharp Williams (D)	James K. Vardaman (D)	8D	Wilson/ Marshall (D) ✓
1914	Earl L. Brewer (D)	Theodore G. Bilbo (D)	Joseph Withers Power (D)	Ross A. Collins (D)	Duncan L. Thompson (D)	Peter Simpson Stovall (D)	Henry E. Blakeslee (D)	Thomas Monroe Henry (D)	Mark A. Brown (D)	45D	133D	John Sharp Williams (D)	James K. Vardaman (D)	8D	Wilson/ Marshall (D) ✓
1915	Earl L. Brewer (D)	Theodore G. Bilbo (D)	Joseph Withers Power (D)	Ross A. Collins (D)	Duncan L. Thompson (D)	Peter Simpson Stovall (D)	Henry E. Blakeslee (D)	Thomas Monroe Henry (D)	Mark A. Brown (D)	45D	133D	John Sharp Williams (D)	James K. Vardaman (D)	8D	Wilson/ Marshall (D) ✓
1916	Theodore G. Bilbo (D)	Lee M. Russell (D)	Joseph Withers Power (D)	Ross A. Collins (D)	Robert E. Wilson (D)	John Peroutt Taylor (D)	Peter P. Garner (D)	Thomas Monroe Henry (D)	Mark A. Brown (D)	45D	133D	John Sharp Williams (D)	James K. Vardaman (D)	8D	Wilson/ Marshall (D) ✓
1917	Theodore G. Bilbo (D)	Lee M. Russell (D)	Joseph Withers Power (D)	Ross A. Collins (D)	Robert E. Wilson (D)	John Peroutt Taylor (D)	Peter P. Garner (D)	Thomas Monroe Henry (D)	Mark A. Brown (D)	45D	133D	John Sharp Williams (D)	James K. Vardaman (D)	8D	Wilson/ Marshall (D) ✓
1918	Theodore G. Bilbo (D)	Lee M. Russell (D)	Joseph Withers Power (D)	Ross A. Collins (D)	Robert E. Wilson (D)	John Peroutt Taylor (D)	Peter P. Garner (D)	Thomas Monroe Henry (D)	Mark A. Brown (D)	45D	133D	John Sharp Williams (D)	James K. Vardaman (D)	8D	Wilson/ Marshall (D) ✓
1919	Theodore G. Bilbo (D)	Lee M. Russell (D)	Joseph Withers Power (D)	Ross A. Collins (D)	Robert E. Wilson (D)	John Peroutt Taylor (D)	Peter P. Garner (D)	Thomas Monroe Henry (D)	Mark A. Brown (D)	45D	133D	John Sharp Williams (D)	Pat Harrison (D)	8D	Wilson/ Marshall (D) ✓
1920	Lee M. Russell (D)	Homer Casteel (D)	Joseph Withers Power (D)	Frank Roberson (D)	W. J. Miller (D)	Larkin S. Rodgers (D)	Peter P. Garner (D)	Thomas Monroe Henry (D)	Mark A. Brown (D)	49D	140D	John Sharp Williams (D)	Pat Harrison (D)	8D	Cox/ Roosevelt (D) ✗
1921	Lee M. Russell (D)	Homer Casteel (D)	Joseph Withers Power (D)	Frank Roberson (D)	W. J. Miller (D)	William M. Murry (D)	Peter P. Garner (D)	Thomas Monroe Henry (D)	R. D. Moore (D)	49D	140D	John Sharp Williams (D)	Pat Harrison (D)	8D	Cox/ Roosevelt (D) ✗
1922	Lee M. Russell (D)	Homer Casteel (D)	Joseph Withers Power (D)	Frank Roberson (D)	W. J. Miller (D)	William M. Murry (D)	Peter P. Garner (D)	Thomas Monroe Henry (D)	R. D. Moore (D)	49D	140D	John Sharp Williams (D)	Pat Harrison (D)	8D	Cox/ Roosevelt (D) ✗
1923	Lee M. Russell (D)	Homer Casteel (D)	Joseph Withers Power (D)	C. D. Potter (D)	W. J. Miller (D)	William M. Murry (D)	Peter P. Garner (D)	Thomas Monroe Henry (D)	R. D. Moore (D)	49D	140D	Hubert D. Stephens (D)	Pat Harrison (D)	8D	Cox/ Roosevelt (D) ✗
1924	Henry L. Whitfield (D)	Dennis Murphree (D)	Joseph Withers Power (D)	Rush H. Knox (D)	George D. Riley (D)	Ben S. Lowry (D)	Peter P. Garner (D)	Thomas Monroe Henry (D)	R. D. Moore (D)	49D	140D	Hubert D. Stephens (D)	Pat Harrison (D)	8D	Davis/ Bryan (D) ✗
1925	Henry L. Whitfield (D)	Dennis Murphree (D)	Joseph Withers Power (D)	Rush H. Knox (D)	George D. Riley (D)	Ben S. Lowry (D)	Peter P. Garner (D)	Thomas Monroe Henry (D)	R. D. Moore (D)	49D	140D	Hubert D. Stephens (D)	Pat Harrison (D)	8D	Davis/ Bryan (D) ✗
1926	Henry L. Whitfield (D)	Dennis Murphree (D)	Walker Wood (D)	Rush H. Knox (D)	George D. Riley (D)	Ben S. Lowry (D)	Peter P. Garner (D)	Thomas Monroe Henry (D)	R. D. Moore (D)	49D	140D	Hubert D. Stephens (D)	Pat Harrison (D)	8D	Davis/ Bryan (D) ✗
1927	Henry L. Whitfield (D)	Dennis Murphree (D)	Walker Wood (D)	Rush H. Knox (D)	George D. Riley (D)	Ben S. Lowry (D)	Peter P. Garner (D)	Thomas Monroe Henry (D)	R. D. Moore (D)	49D	140D	Hubert D. Stephens (D)	Pat Harrison (D)	8D	Davis/ Bryan (D) ✗
1927	Dennis Murphree (D)	vacant	Walker Wood (D)	Rush H. Knox (D)	George D. Riley (D)	Ben S. Lowry (D)	Peter P. Garner (D)	Thomas Monroe Henry (D)	R. D. Moore (D)	49D	140D	Hubert D. Stephens (D)	Pat Harrison (D)	8D	Davis/ Bryan (D) ✗
1928	Theodore G. Bilbo (D)	Clayton B. Adams (D)	Walker Wood (D)	George T. Mitchell (D)	C. C. White (D)	Webb Walley (D)	J. C. Holton (D)	Ben S. Lowry (D)	R. D. Moore (D)	49D	140D	Hubert D. Stephens (D)	Pat Harrison (D)	8D	Smith/ Robinson (D) ✗
1929	Theodore G. Bilbo (D)	Clayton B. Adams (D)	Walker Wood (D)	George T. Mitchell (D)	C. C. White (D)	Webb Walley (D)	J. C. Holton (D)	Ben S. Lowry (D)	R. D. Moore (D)	49D	140D	Hubert D. Stephens (D)	Pat Harrison (D)	8D	Smith/ Robinson (D) ✗
1930	Theodore G. Bilbo (D)	Clayton B. Adams (D)	Walker Wood (D)	George T. Mitchell (D)	C. C. White (D)	Webb Walley (D)	J. C. Holton (D)	Ben S. Lowry (D)	R. D. Moore (D)	49D	140D	Hubert D. Stephens (D)	Pat Harrison (D)	8D	Smith/ Robinson (D) ✗
1931	Theodore G. Bilbo (D)	Clayton B. Adams (D)	Walker Wood (D)	George T. Mitchell (D)	C. C. White (D)	Webb Walley (D)	J. C. Holton (D)	Ben S. Lowry (D)	R. D. Moore (D)	49D	140D	Hubert D. Stephens (D)	Pat Harrison (D)	8D	Smith/ Robinson (D) ✗
1932	Martin Sennet Conner (D)	Dennis Murphree (D)	Walker Wood (D)	Greek L. Rice (D)	Joe S. Price (D)	Lewis S. May (D)	J. C. Holton (D)	George D. Riley (D)	R. D. Moore (D)	49D	140D	Hubert D. Stephens (D)	Pat Harrison (D)	8D	Roosevelt/ Garner (D) ✓
1933	Martin Sennet Conner (D)	Dennis Murphree (D)	Walker Wood (D)	Greek L. Rice (D)	Joe S. Price (D)	Lewis S. May (D)	J. C. Holton (D)	George D. Riley (D)	R. D. Moore (D)	49D	140D	Hubert D. Stephens (D)	Pat Harrison (D)	7D	Roosevelt/ Garner (D) ✓
1934	Martin Sennet Conner (D)	Dennis Murphree (D)	Walker Wood (D)	Greek L. Rice (D)	Joe S. Price (D)	Lewis S. May (D)	J. C. Holton (D)	George D. Riley (D)	R. D. Moore (D)	49D	140D	Hubert D. Stephens (D)	Pat Harrison (D)	7D	Roosevelt/ Garner (D) ✓
1935	Martin Sennet Conner (D)	Dennis Murphree (D)	Walker Wood (D)	Greek L. Rice (D)	Joe S. Price (D)	Lewis S. May (D)	J. C. Holton (D)	George D. Riley (D)	R. D. Moore (D)	49D	140D	Theodore G. Bilbo (D)	Pat Harrison (D)	7D	Roosevelt/ Garner (D) ✓
1936	Hugh L. White (D)	Jacob Buehler Snider (D)	Walker Wood (D)	Greek L. Rice (D)	Carl Craig (D)	Newton James (D)	J. C. Holton (D)	J. S. Williams (D)	R. D. Moore (D)	49D	140D	Theodore G. Bilbo (D)	Pat Harrison (D)	7D	Roosevelt/ Garner (D) ✓
1937	Hugh L. White (D)	Jacob Buehler Snider (D)	Walker Wood (D)	Greek L. Rice (D)	Carl Craig (D)	Newton James (D)	J. C. Holton (D)	J. S. Williams (D)	R. D. Moore (D)	49D	140D	Theodore G. Bilbo (D)	Pat Harrison (D)	7D	Roosevelt/ Garner (D) ✓
1938	Hugh L. White (D)	Jacob Buehler Snider (D)	Walker Wood (D)	Greek L. Rice (D)	Carl Craig (D)	Newton James (D)	J. C. Holton (D)	J. S. Williams (D)	R. D. Moore (D)	49D	140D	Theodore G. Bilbo (D)	Pat Harrison (D)	7D	Roosevelt/ Garner (D) ✓
1939	Hugh L. White (D)	Jacob Buehler Snider (D)	Walker Wood (D)	Greek L. Rice (D)	Carl Craig (D)	Newton James (D)	J. C. Holton (D)	J. S. Williams (D)	R. D. Moore (D)	49D	140D	Theodore G. Bilbo (D)	Pat Harrison (D)	7D	Roosevelt/ Garner (D) ✓
1940	Paul B. Johnson Sr. (D)	Dennis Murphree (D)	Walker Wood (D)	Greek L. Rice (D)	James M. Causey (D)	Lewis S. May (D)	Si Corley (D)	J. S. Williams (D)	R. D. Moore (D)	49D	140D	Theodore G. Bilbo (D)	Pat Harrison (D)	7D	Roosevelt/ Wallace (D) ✓
1941	Paul B. Johnson Sr. (D)	Dennis Murphree (D)	Walker Wood (D)	Greek L. Rice (D)	James M. Causey (D)	Lewis S. May (D)	Si Corley (D)	J. S. Williams (D)	Guy McCullen (D)	49D	140D	Theodore G. Bilbo (D)	James Eastland (D)	7D	Roosevelt/ Wallace (D) ✓
1941	Paul B. Johnson Sr. (D)	Dennis Murphree (D)	Walker Wood (D)	Greek L. Rice (D)	James M. Causey (D)	Lewis S. May (D)	Si Corley (D)	J. S. Williams (D)	Guy McCullen (D)	49D	140D	Theodore G. Bilbo (D)	Wall Doxey (D)	7D	Roosevelt/ Wallace (D) ✓
1942	Paul B. Johnson Sr. (D)	Dennis Murphree (D)	Walker Wood (D)	Greek L. Rice (D)	James M. Causey (D)	Lewis S. May (D)	Si Corley (D)	J. S. Williams (D)	Guy McCullen (D)	49D	140D	Theodore G. Bilbo (D)	Wall Doxey (D)	7D	Roosevelt/ Wallace (D) ✓
1943	Paul B. Johnson Sr. (D)	Dennis Murphree (D)	Walker Wood (D)	Greek L. Rice (D)	James M. Causey (D)	Lewis S. May (D)	Si Corley (D)	J. S. Williams (D)	Guy McCullen (D)	49D	140D	Theodore G. Bilbo (D)	James Eastland (D)	7D	Roosevelt/ Wallace (D) ✓
1943	Dennis Murphree (D)	vacant	Walker Wood (D)	Greek L. Rice (D)	James M. Causey (D)	Lewis S. May (D)	Si Corley (D)	J. S. Williams (D)	Guy McCullen (D)	49D	140D	Theodore G. Bilbo (D)	James Eastland (D)	7D	Roosevelt/ Wallace (D) ✓
1944	Thomas L. Bailey (D)	Fielding L. Wright (D)	Walker Wood (D)	Greek L. Rice (D)	Bert J. Barnett (D)	Newton James (D)	Si Corley (D)	J. S. Williams (D)	Guy McCullen (D)	49D	140D	Theodore G. Bilbo (D)	James Eastland (D)	7D	Roosevelt/ Truman (D) ✓
1945	Thomas L. Bailey (D)	Fielding L. Wright (D)	Walker Wood (D)	Greek L. Rice (D)	Bert J. Barnett (D)	Newton James (D)	Si Corley (D)	J. S. Williams (D)	Guy McCullen (D)	49D	140D	Theodore G. Bilbo (D)	James Eastland (D)	7D	Roosevelt/ Truman (D) ✓
1946	Thomas L. Bailey (D)	Fielding L. Wright (D)	Walker Wood (D)	Greek L. Rice (D)	Bert J. Barnett (D)	Newton James (D)	Si Corley (D)	J. S. Williams (D)	Guy McCullen (D)	49D	140D	Theodore G. Bilbo (D)	James Eastland (D)	7D	Roosevelt/ Truman (D) ✓
1946	Fielding L. Wright (D) (Note: As lieutenant governor, filled unexpired term, and was later elected in his own right.)	vacant	Walker Wood (D)	Greek L. Rice (D)	Bert J. Barnett (D)	Newton James (D)	Si Corley (D)	J. S. Williams (D)	Guy McCullen (D)	49D	140D	Theodore G. Bilbo (D)	James Eastland (D)	7D	Roosevelt/ Truman (D) ✓
1947	Fielding L. Wright (D)	vacant	Walker Wood (D)	Greek L. Rice (D)	Bert J. Barnett (D)	Newton James (D)	Si Corley (D)	J. S. Williams (D)	Guy McCullen (D)	49D	140D	John C. Stennis (D)	James Eastland (D)	7D	Roosevelt/ Truman (D) ✓
1948	Fielding L. Wright (D)	Sam Lumpkin (D)	Heber Austin Ladner (D)	Greek L. Rice (D)	Carl Craig (D)	R. W. May (D)	Si Corley (D)	Jesse L. White (D)	W. L. McGahey (D)	49D	140D	John C. Stennis (D)	James Eastland (D)	7D	Thurmond/ Wright (Dix) ✗
1949	Fielding L. Wright (D)	Sam Lumpkin (D)	Heber Austin Ladner (D)	Greek L. Rice (D)	Carl Craig (D)	R. W. May (D)	Si Corley (D)	Jesse L. White (D)	W. L. McGahey (D)	49D	140D	John C. Stennis (D)	James Eastland (D)	7D	Thurmond/ Wright (Dix) ✗
1950	Fielding L. Wright (D)	Sam Lumpkin (D)	Heber Austin Ladner (D)	Greek L. Rice (D)	Carl Craig (D)	R. W. May (D)	Si Corley (D)	Jesse L. White (D)	W. L. McGahey (D)	49D	140D	John C. Stennis (D)	James Eastland (D)	7D	Thurmond/ Wright (Dix) ✗
1951	Fielding L. Wright (D)	Sam Lumpkin (D)	Heber Austin Ladner (D)	Greek L. Rice (D)	Carl Craig (D)	R. W. May (D)	Si Corley (D)	Jesse L. White (D)	W. L. McGahey (D)	49D	140D	John C. Stennis (D)	James Eastland (D)	7D	Thurmond/ Wright (Dix) ✗
1952	Hugh L. White (D)	Carroll Gartin (D)	Heber Austin Ladner (D)	James P. Coleman (D)	William D. Neal (D)	Newton James (D)	Si Corley (D)	Walter D. Davis (D)	W. L. McGahey (D)	49D	140D	John C. Stennis (D)	James Eastland (D)	7D	Stevenson/ Sparkman (D) ✗
1953	Hugh L. White (D)	Carroll Gartin (D)	Heber Austin Ladner (D)	James P. Coleman (D)	William D. Neal (D)	Newton James (D)	Si Corley (D)	Walter D. Davis (D)	W. L. McGahey (D)	49D	140D	John C. Stennis (D)	James Eastland (D)	6D	Stevenson/ Sparkman (D) ✗
1954	Hugh L. White (D)	Carroll Gartin (D)	Heber Austin Ladner (D)	James P. Coleman (D)	William D. Neal (D)	Newton James (D)	Si Corley (D)	Walter D. Davis (D)	W. L. McGahey (D)	49D	140D	John C. Stennis (D)	James Eastland (D)	6D	Stevenson/ Sparkman (D) ✗
1955	Hugh L. White (D)	Carroll Gartin (D)	Heber Austin Ladner (D)	James P. Coleman (D)	William D. Neal (D)	Newton James (D)	Si Corley (D)	Walter D. Davis (D)	W. L. McGahey (D)	49D	140D	John C. Stennis (D)	James Eastland (D)	6D	Stevenson/ Sparkman (D) ✗
1956	James P. Coleman (D)	Carroll Gartin (D)	Heber Austin Ladner (D)	Joseph Turner Patterson (D)	E. Boyd Golding (D)	Robert D. Morrow Sr. (D)	Si Corley (D)	Walter D. Davis (D)	Bob Graham (D)	49D	140D	John C. Stennis (D)	James Eastland (D)	6D	Stevenson/ Kefauver (D) ✗
1957	James P. Coleman (D)	Carroll Gartin (D)	Heber Austin Ladner (D)	Joseph Turner Patterson (D)	E. Boyd Golding (D)	Robert D. Morrow Sr. (D)	Si Corley (D)	Walter D. Davis (D)	Bob Graham (D)	49D	140D	John C. Stennis (D)	James Eastland (D)	6D	Stevenson/ Kefauver (D) ✗
1958	James P. Coleman (D)	Carroll Gartin (D)	Heber Austin Ladner (D)	Joseph Turner Patterson (D)	E. Boyd Golding (D)	Robert D. Morrow Sr. (D)	Si Corley (D)	Walter D. Davis (D)	Bob Graham (D)	49D	140D	John C. Stennis (D)	James Eastland (D)	6D	Stevenson/ Kefauver (D) ✗
1959	James P. Coleman (D)	Carroll Gartin (D)	Heber Austin Ladner (D)	Joseph Turner Patterson (D)	E. Boyd Golding (D)	Robert D. Morrow Sr. (D)	Si Corley (D)	Walter D. Davis (D)	Bob Graham (D)	49D	140D	John C. Stennis (D)	James Eastland (D)	6D	Stevenson/ Kefauver (D) ✗
1960	Ross Barnett (D)	Paul B. Johnson Jr. (D)	Heber Austin Ladner (D)	Joseph Turner Patterson (D)	William D. Neal (D)	Evelyn Gandy (D)	Si Corley (D)	Walter D. Davis (D)	Bob Graham (D)	49D	140D	John C. Stennis (D)	James Eastland (D)	6D	Byrd/ Thurmond (Dix) ✗
1961	Ross Barnett (D)	Paul B. Johnson Jr. (D)	Heber Austin Ladner (D)	Joseph Turner Patterson (D)	William D. Neal (D)	Evelyn Gandy (D)	Si Corley (D)	Walter D. Davis (D)	Bob Graham (D)	49D	140D	John C. Stennis (D)	James Eastland (D)	6D	Byrd/ Thurmond (Dix) ✗
1962	Ross Barnett (D)	Paul B. Johnson Jr. (D)	Heber Austin Ladner (D)	Joseph Turner Patterson (D)	William D. Neal (D)	Evelyn Gandy (D)	Si Corley (D)	Walter D. Davis (D)	Bob Graham (D)	49D	140D	John C. Stennis (D)	James Eastland (D)	6D	Byrd/ Thurmond (Dix) ✗
1963	Ross Barnett (D)	Paul B. Johnson Jr. (D)	Heber Austin Ladner (D)	Joseph Turner Patterson (D)	William D. Neal (D)	Evelyn Gandy (D)	Si Corley (D)	Walter D. Davis (D)	Bob Graham (D)	49D	139D, 1R (Note: Lewis McAllister won a special election to become the first Republican to win a seat in the Mississippi House of Representatives in four decades.)	John C. Stennis (D)	James Eastland (D)	5D	Byrd/ Thurmond (Dix) ✗
1964	Paul B. Johnson Jr. (D)	Carroll Gartin (D)	Heber Austin Ladner (D)	Joseph Turner Patterson (D)	Hamp King (D)	William F. Winter (D)	Si Corley (D)	Walter D. Davis (D)	Bob Graham (D)	51D, 1R (Note: Seelig Wise became the first Republican to win a seat in the Mississippi Senate in the 20th Century during the 1963 general election.)	120D, 2R	John C. Stennis (D)	James Eastland (D)	5D	Goldwater/ Miller (R) ✗
1965	Paul B. Johnson Jr. (D)	Carroll Gartin (D)	Heber Austin Ladner (D)	Joseph Turner Patterson (D)	Hamp King (D)	William F. Winter (D)	Si Corley (D)	Walter D. Davis (D)	Bob Graham (D)	51D, 1R	120D, 2R	John C. Stennis (D)	James Eastland (D)	4D, 1R	Goldwater/ Miller (R) ✗
1966	Paul B. Johnson Jr. (D)	vacant	Heber Austin Ladner (D)	Joseph Turner Patterson (D)	Hamp King (D)	William F. Winter (D)	Si Corley (D)	Walter D. Davis (D)	Bob Graham (D)	51D, 1R	120D, 2R	John C. Stennis (D)	James Eastland (D)	4D, 1R	Goldwater/ Miller (R) ✗
1967	Paul B. Johnson Jr. (D)	vacant	Heber Austin Ladner (D)	Joseph Turner Patterson (D)	Hamp King (D)	William F. Winter (D)	Si Corley (D)	Walter D. Davis (D)	Bob Graham (D)	51D, 1R	120D, 2R	John C. Stennis (D)	James Eastland (D)	5D	Goldwater/ Miller (R) ✗
1968	John Bell Williams (D)	Charles L. Sullivan (D)	Heber Austin Ladner (D)	Joseph Turner Patterson (D)	Hamp King (D)	Evelyn Gandy (D)	Jim Buck Ross (D)	Walter D. Davis (D)	Watt Carter (D)	52D	122D	John C. Stennis (D)	James Eastland (D)	5D	Wallace/ LeMay (AI) ✗
1969	John Bell Williams (D)	Charles L. Sullivan (D)	Heber Austin Ladner (D)	A. F. Summer (D)	Hamp King (D)	Evelyn Gandy (D)	Jim Buck Ross (D)	Walter D. Davis (D)	Watt Carter (D)	52D	122D	John C. Stennis (D)	James Eastland (D)	5D	Wallace/ LeMay (AI) ✗
1970	John Bell Williams (D)	Charles L. Sullivan (D)	Heber Austin Ladner (D)	A. F. Summer (D)	Hamp King (D)	Evelyn Gandy (D)	Jim Buck Ross (D)	Walter D. Davis (D)	Watt Carter (D)	52D	122D	John C. Stennis (D)	James Eastland (D)	5D	Wallace/ LeMay (AI) ✗
1971	John Bell Williams (D)	Charles L. Sullivan (D)	Heber Austin Ladner (D)	A. F. Summer (D)	Hamp King (D)	Evelyn Gandy (D)	Jim Buck Ross (D)	Walter D. Davis (D)	Watt Carter (D)	52D	122D	John C. Stennis (D)	James Eastland (D)	5D	Wallace/ LeMay (AI) ✗
1972	Bill Waller (D)	William F. Winter (D)	Heber Austin Ladner (D)	A. F. Summer (D)	Hamp King (D)	Brad Dye (D)	Jim Buck Ross (D)	Evelyn Gandy (D)	Watt Carter (D)	50D, 2R	119D, 3R	John C. Stennis (D)	James Eastland (D)	5D	Nixon/ Agnew (R) ✓
1973	Bill Waller (D)	William F. Winter (D)	Heber Austin Ladner (D)	A. F. Summer (D)	Hamp King (D)	Brad Dye (D)	Jim Buck Ross (D)	Evelyn Gandy (D)	Watt Carter (D)	50D, 2R	119D, 3R	John C. Stennis (D)	James Eastland (D)	3D, 2R	Nixon/ Agnew (R) ✓
1974	Bill Waller (D)	William F. Winter (D)	Heber Austin Ladner (D)	A. F. Summer (D)	Hamp King (D)	Brad Dye (D)	Jim Buck Ross (D)	Evelyn Gandy (D)	Watt Carter (D)	50D, 2R	119D, 3R	John C. Stennis (D)	James Eastland (D)	3D, 2R	Nixon/ Agnew (R) ✓
1975	Bill Waller (D)	William F. Winter (D)	Heber Austin Ladner (D)	A. F. Summer (D)	Hamp King (D)	Brad Dye (D)	Jim Buck Ross (D)	Evelyn Gandy (D)	Watt Carter (D)	50D, 2R	119D, 3R	John C. Stennis (D)	James Eastland (D)	3D, 2R	Nixon/ Agnew (R) ✓
1976	Cliff Finch (D)	Evelyn Gandy (D)	Heber Austin Ladner (D)	A. F. Summer (D)	Hamp King (D)	Edwin L. Pittman (D)	Jim Buck Ross (D)	George Dale (D)	John Ed Ainsworth (D)	50D, 2R	118D, 4R	John C. Stennis (D)	James Eastland (D)	3D, 2R	Carter/ Mondale (D) ✓
1977	Cliff Finch (D)	Evelyn Gandy (D)	Heber Austin Ladner (D)	A. F. Summer (D)	Hamp King (D)	Edwin L. Pittman (D)	Jim Buck Ross (D)	George Dale (D)	John Ed Ainsworth (D)	50D, 2R	118D, 4R	John C. Stennis (D)	James Eastland (D)	3D, 2R	Carter/ Mondale (D) ✓
1978	Cliff Finch (D)	Evelyn Gandy (D)	Heber Austin Ladner (D)	A. F. Summer (D)	Hamp King (D)	Edwin L. Pittman (D)	Jim Buck Ross (D)	George Dale (D)	John Ed Ainsworth (D)	50D, 2R	118D, 4R	John C. Stennis (D)	Thad Cochran (R) (Note: Elected in November 1978 then appointed by Governor to vacancy caused by resignation of his predecessor.)	3D, 2R	Carter/ Mondale (D) ✓
1979	Cliff Finch (D)	Evelyn Gandy (D)	Heber Austin Ladner (D)	A. F. Summer (D)	Hamp King (D)	Edwin L. Pittman (D)	Jim Buck Ross (D)	George Dale (D)	John Ed Ainsworth (D)	50D, 2R	118D, 4R	John C. Stennis (D)	Thad Cochran (R)	3D, 2R	Carter/ Mondale (D) ✓

== 1980–present ==
Year	Executive offices								State Legislature		United States Congress			Electoral votes
Year	Governor	Lt. Governor	Secretary of State	Attorney General	Auditor	Treasurer	Comm. of Ag. and Commerce	Comm. of Ins.	Senate	House	Senator (Class I)	Senator (Class II)	House	Electoral votes
1980	William F. Winter (D)	Brad Dye (D)	Edwin L. Pittman (D)	William Allain (D)	Hamp King (D)	John L. Dale (D)	Jim Buck Ross (D)	George Dale (D)	48D, 4R	116D, 6R	John C. Stennis (D)	Thad Cochran (R)	3D, 2R	Reagan/ Bush (R) ✓
1981	William F. Winter (D)	Brad Dye (D)	Edwin L. Pittman (D)	William Allain (D)	Hamp King (D)	William J. Cole (D)	Jim Buck Ross (D)	George Dale (D)	48D, 4R	116D, 6R	John C. Stennis (D)	Thad Cochran (R)	3D, 2R	Reagan/ Bush (R) ✓
1981	William F. Winter (D)	Brad Dye (D)	Edwin L. Pittman (D)	William Allain (D)	Hamp King (D)	William J. Cole (D)	Jim Buck Ross (D)	George Dale (D)	48D, 4R	116D, 6R	John C. Stennis (D)	Thad Cochran (R)	4D, 1R	Reagan/ Bush (R) ✓
1982	William F. Winter (D)	Brad Dye (D)	Edwin L. Pittman (D)	William Allain (D)	Hamp King (D)	William J. Cole (D)	Jim Buck Ross (D)	George Dale (D)	48D, 4R	116D, 6R	John C. Stennis (D)	Thad Cochran (R)	4D, 1R	Reagan/ Bush (R) ✓
1983	William F. Winter (D)	Brad Dye (D)	Edwin L. Pittman (D)	William Allain (D)	Hamp King (D)	William J. Cole (D)	Jim Buck Ross (D)	George Dale (D)	48D, 4R	116D, 6R	John C. Stennis (D)	Thad Cochran (R)	3D, 2R	Reagan/ Bush (R) ✓
1984	William Allain (D)	Brad Dye (D)	Dick Molpus (D)	Edwin L. Pittman (D)	Ray Mabus (D)	William J. Cole (D)	Jim Buck Ross (D)	George Dale (D)	49D, 3R	116D, 6R	John C. Stennis (D)	Thad Cochran (R)	3D, 2R	Reagan/ Bush (R) ✓
1985	William Allain (D)	Brad Dye (D)	Dick Molpus (D)	Edwin L. Pittman (D)	Ray Mabus (D)	William J. Cole (D)	Jim Buck Ross (D)	George Dale (D)	49D, 3R	116D, 6R	John C. Stennis (D)	Thad Cochran (R)	3D, 2R	Reagan/ Bush (R) ✓
1986	William Allain (D)	Brad Dye (D)	Dick Molpus (D)	Edwin L. Pittman (D)	Ray Mabus (D)	William J. Cole (D)	Jim Buck Ross (D)	George Dale (D)	49D, 3R	116D, 6R	John C. Stennis (D)	Thad Cochran (R)	3D, 2R	Reagan/ Bush (R) ✓
1987	William Allain (D)	Brad Dye (D)	Dick Molpus (D)	Edwin L. Pittman (D)	Ray Mabus (D)	William J. Cole (D)	Jim Buck Ross (D)	George Dale (D)	49D, 3R	116D, 6R	John C. Stennis (D)	Thad Cochran (R)	4D, 1R	Reagan/ Bush (R) ✓
1988	Ray Mabus (D)	Brad Dye (D)	Dick Molpus (D)	Mike Moore (D)	Pete Johnson (D)	Marshall G. Bennett (D)	Jim Buck Ross (D)	George Dale (D)	45D, 7R	113D, 9R	John C. Stennis (D)	Thad Cochran (R)	4D, 1R	Bush/ Quayle (R) ✓
1989	Ray Mabus (D)	Brad Dye (D)	Dick Molpus (D)	Mike Moore (D)	Pete Johnson (R) (Note: Switched parties.)	Marshall G. Bennett (D)	Jim Buck Ross (D)	George Dale (D)	45D, 7R	113D, 9R	Trent Lott (R)	Thad Cochran (R)	4D, 1R	Bush/ Quayle (R) ✓
1990	Ray Mabus (D)	Brad Dye (D)	Dick Molpus (D)	Mike Moore (D)	Pete Johnson (R)	Marshall G. Bennett (D)	Jim Buck Ross (D)	George Dale (D)	45D, 7R	113D, 9R	Trent Lott (R)	Thad Cochran (R)	5D	Bush/ Quayle (R) ✓
1991	Ray Mabus (D)	Brad Dye (D)	Dick Molpus (D)	Mike Moore (D)	Pete Johnson (R)	Marshall G. Bennett (D)	Jim Buck Ross (D)	George Dale (D)	45D, 7R	113D, 9R	Trent Lott (R)	Thad Cochran (R)	5D	Bush/ Quayle (R) ✓
1992	Kirk Fordice (R)	Eddie Briggs (R)	Dick Molpus (D)	Mike Moore (D)	Steve Patterson (D)	Marshall G. Bennett (D)	Jim Buck Ross (D)	George Dale (D)	43D, 9R	98D, 24R	Trent Lott (R)	Thad Cochran (R)	5D	Bush/ Quayle (R) ✗
1993	Kirk Fordice (R)	Eddie Briggs (R)	Dick Molpus (D)	Mike Moore (D)	Steve Patterson (D)	Marshall G. Bennett (D)	Jim Buck Ross (D)	George Dale (D)	39D, 13R (Note: Due to pre-clearance issues with the Department of Justice over the Voting Rights Act with unconstitutional redistricting, federal courts forced a second election for the whole legislature in 1992 for a three-year term.)	93D, 29R	Trent Lott (R)	Thad Cochran (R)	5D	Bush/ Quayle (R) ✗
1994	Kirk Fordice (R)	Eddie Briggs (R)	Dick Molpus (D)	Mike Moore (D)	Steve Patterson (D)	Marshall G. Bennett (D)	Jim Buck Ross (D)	George Dale (D)	39D, 13R	93D, 29R	Trent Lott (R)	Thad Cochran (R)	5D	Bush/ Quayle (R) ✗
1995	Kirk Fordice (R)	Eddie Briggs (R)	Dick Molpus (D)	Mike Moore (D)	Steve Patterson (D)	Marshall G. Bennett (D)	Jim Buck Ross (D)	George Dale (D)	39D, 13R	93D, 29R	Trent Lott (R)	Thad Cochran (R)	4D, 1R	Bush/ Quayle (R) ✗
1996	Kirk Fordice (R)	Ronnie Musgrove (D)	Eric Clark (D)	Mike Moore (D)	Steve Patterson (D)	Marshall G. Bennett (D)	Lester Spell (D)	George Dale (D)	34D, 18R	86D, 33R, 3I	Trent Lott (R)	Thad Cochran (R)	3D, 2R	Dole/ Kemp (R) ✗
1996	Kirk Fordice (R)	Ronnie Musgrove (D)	Eric Clark (D)	Mike Moore (D)	Phil Bryant (R) (Note: Initially appointed to fill vacancy; later elected.)	Marshall G. Bennett (D)	Lester Spell (D)	George Dale (D)	34D, 18R	86D, 33R, 3I	Trent Lott (R)	Thad Cochran (R)	3D, 2R	Dole/ Kemp (R) ✗
1997	Kirk Fordice (R)	Ronnie Musgrove (D)	Eric Clark (D)	Mike Moore (D)	Phil Bryant (R)	Marshall G. Bennett (D)	Lester Spell (D)	George Dale (D)	34D, 18R	86D, 33R, 3I	Trent Lott (R)	Thad Cochran (R)	3R, 2D	Dole/ Kemp (R) ✗
1998	Kirk Fordice (R)	Ronnie Musgrove (D)	Eric Clark (D)	Mike Moore (D)	Phil Bryant (R)	Marshall G. Bennett (D)	Lester Spell (D)	George Dale (D)	34D, 18R	86D, 33R, 3I	Trent Lott (R)	Thad Cochran (R)	3R, 2D	Dole/ Kemp (R) ✗
1999	Kirk Fordice (R)	Ronnie Musgrove (D)	Eric Clark (D)	Mike Moore (D)	Phil Bryant (R)	Marshall G. Bennett (D)	Lester Spell (D)	George Dale (D)	34D, 18R	86D, 33R, 3I	Trent Lott (R)	Thad Cochran (R)	3D, 2R	Dole/ Kemp (R) ✗
2000	Ronnie Musgrove (D)	Amy Tuck (D)	Eric Clark (D)	Mike Moore (D)	Phil Bryant (R)	Marshall G. Bennett (D)	Lester Spell (D)	George Dale (D)	34D, 18R	86D, 33R, 3I	Trent Lott (R)	Thad Cochran (R)	3D, 2R	Bush/ Cheney (R) ✓
2001	Ronnie Musgrove (D)	Amy Tuck (D)	Eric Clark (D)	Mike Moore (D)	Phil Bryant (R)	Marshall G. Bennett (D)	Lester Spell (D)	George Dale (D)	34D, 18R	86D, 33R, 3I	Trent Lott (R)	Thad Cochran (R)	3D, 2R	Bush/ Cheney (R) ✓
2002	Ronnie Musgrove (D)	Amy Tuck (D)	Eric Clark (D)	Mike Moore (D)	Phil Bryant (R)	Marshall G. Bennett (D)	Lester Spell (D)	George Dale (D)	34D, 18R	86D, 33R, 3I	Trent Lott (R)	Thad Cochran (R)	3D, 2R	Bush/ Cheney (R) ✓
2002	Ronnie Musgrove (D)	Amy Tuck (R)	Eric Clark (D)	Mike Moore (D)	Phil Bryant (R)	Marshall G. Bennett (D)	Lester Spell (D)	George Dale (D)	34D, 18R	86D, 33R, 3I	Trent Lott (R)	Thad Cochran (R)	3D, 2R	Bush/ Cheney (R) ✓
2003	Ronnie Musgrove (D)	Amy Tuck (R)	Eric Clark (D)	Mike Moore (D)	Phil Bryant (R)	Peyton Prospere (D) (Note: Appointed to fill vacancy.)	Lester Spell (D)	George Dale (D)	29D, 23R (Note: Four senators, Terry Burton, Videt Carmichael, George "Tommy" Dickerson, and Travis Little, switched parties from Democratic to Republican before the 2003 session. A special election, brought on by the resignation of Democrat John White, flipped another seat when Republican Charles Walden won to succeed him before the session.)	81D, 38R, 3I (Note: Five representatives, Larry Baker, Jim Barnett, Herb Frierson, Frank Hamilton, and John Read, switched parties from Democratic to Republican.)	Trent Lott (R)	Thad Cochran (R)	2D, 2R	Bush/ Cheney (R) ✓
2004	Haley Barbour (R)	Amy Tuck (R)	Eric Clark (D)	Jim Hood (D)	Phil Bryant (R)	Tate Reeves (R)	Lester Spell (D)	George Dale (D)	29D, 23R	76D, 46R	Trent Lott (R)	Thad Cochran (R)	2D, 2R	Bush/ Cheney (R) ✓
2005	Haley Barbour (R)	Amy Tuck (R)	Eric Clark (D)	Jim Hood (D)	Phil Bryant (R)	Tate Reeves (R)	Lester Spell (D)	George Dale (D)	28D, 24R (Note: One senator switched parties from Democratic to Republican.)	75D, 47R	Trent Lott (R)	Thad Cochran (R)	2D, 2R	Bush/ Cheney (R) ✓
2005	Haley Barbour (R)	Amy Tuck (R)	Eric Clark (D)	Jim Hood (D)	Phil Bryant (R)	Tate Reeves (R)	Lester Spell (R)	George Dale (D)	28D, 24R	75D, 47R	Trent Lott (R)	Thad Cochran (R)	2D, 2R	Bush/ Cheney (R) ✓
2006	Haley Barbour (R)	Amy Tuck (R)	Eric Clark (D)	Jim Hood (D)	Phil Bryant (R)	Tate Reeves (R)	Lester Spell (R)	George Dale (D)	28D, 24R	75D, 47R	Trent Lott (R)	Thad Cochran (R)	2D, 2R	Bush/ Cheney (R) ✓
2007	Haley Barbour (R)	Amy Tuck (R)	Eric Clark (D)	Jim Hood (D)	Phil Bryant (R)	Tate Reeves (R)	Lester Spell (R)	George Dale (D)	27R, 25D (Note: Senators James Walley and Tommy Gollott switched parties from Democratic to Republican, flipping control of the chamber.)	75D, 47R	Trent Lott (R)	Thad Cochran (R)	2D, 2R	Bush/ Cheney (R) ✓
2008	Haley Barbour (R)	Phil Bryant (R)	Delbert; Hosemann (R)	Jim Hood (D)	Stacey Pickering (R)	Tate Reeves (R)	Lester Spell (R)	Mike Chaney (R)	27D, 25R	75D, 47R	Roger Wicker (R)	Thad Cochran (R)	3D, 1R	McCain/ Palin (R) ✗
2008	Haley Barbour (R)	Phil Bryant (R)	Delbert; Hosemann (R)	Jim Hood (D)	Stacey Pickering (R)	Tate Reeves (R)	Lester Spell (R)	Mike Chaney (R)	27D, 25R	74D, 48R (Note: One representative switched parties from Democratic to Republican.)	Roger Wicker (R)	Thad Cochran (R)	3D, 1R	McCain/ Palin (R) ✗
2009	Haley Barbour (R)	Phil Bryant (R)	Delbert; Hosemann (R)	Jim Hood (D)	Stacey Pickering (R)	Tate Reeves (R)	Lester Spell (R)	Mike Chaney (R)	27D, 25R	73D, 49R	Roger Wicker (R)	Thad Cochran (R)	3D, 1R	McCain/ Palin (R) ✗
2010	Haley Barbour (R)	Phil Bryant (R)	Delbert; Hosemann (R)	Jim Hood (D)	Stacey Pickering (R)	Tate Reeves (R)	Lester Spell (R)	Mike Chaney (R)	27D, 25R	73D, 49R	Roger Wicker (R)	Thad Cochran (R)	3D, 1R	McCain/ Palin (R) ✗
2011	Haley Barbour (R)	Phil Bryant (R)	Delbert; Hosemann (R)	Jim Hood (D)	Stacey Pickering (R)	Tate Reeves (R)	Lester Spell (R)	Mike Chaney (R)	27R, 25D (Note: Senators Cindy Hyde-Smith and Ezell Lee switched parties from Democratic to Republican.)	68D, 54R (Note: Four representatives, C. Scott Bounds, Bobby Shows, Russ Nowell, and Margaret Rogers, switched parties from Democratic to Republican between the 2010 and 2011 sessions of the legislature. After the session, Rep. Jeff Smith switched parties from Democratic to Republican to run in the general election.)	Roger Wicker (R)	Thad Cochran (R)	3R, 1D	McCain/ Palin (R) ✗
2012	Phil Bryant (R)	Tate Reeves (R)	Delbert; Hosemann (R)	Jim Hood (D)	Stacey Pickering (R)	Lynn Fitch (R)	Cindy; Hyde-Smith (R)	Mike Chaney (R)	31R, 21D	64R, 58D	Roger Wicker (R)	Thad Cochran (R)	3R, 1D	Romney/ Ryan (R) ✗
2013	Phil Bryant (R)	Tate Reeves (R)	Delbert; Hosemann (R)	Jim Hood (D)	Stacey Pickering (R)	Lynn Fitch (R)	Cindy; Hyde-Smith (R)	Mike Chaney (R)	32R, 20D	65R, 57D	Roger Wicker (R)	Thad Cochran (R)	3R, 1D	Romney/ Ryan (R) ✗
2014	Phil Bryant (R)	Tate Reeves (R)	Delbert; Hosemann (R)	Jim Hood (D)	Stacey Pickering (R)	Lynn Fitch (R)	Cindy; Hyde-Smith (R)	Mike Chaney (R)	32R, 20D	66R, 56D	Roger Wicker (R)	Thad Cochran (R)	3R, 1D	Romney/ Ryan (R) ✗
2015	Phil Bryant (R)	Tate Reeves (R)	Delbert; Hosemann (R)	Jim Hood (D)	Stacey Pickering (R)	Lynn Fitch (R)	Cindy; Hyde-Smith (R)	Mike Chaney (R)	32R, 20D	67R, 55D	Roger Wicker (R)	Thad Cochran (R)	3R, 1D	Romney/ Ryan (R) ✗
2016	Phil Bryant (R)	Tate Reeves (R)	Delbert; Hosemann (R)	Jim Hood (D)	Stacey Pickering (R)	Lynn Fitch (R)	Cindy; Hyde-Smith (R)	Mike Chaney (R)	32R, 20D	74R, 48D	Roger Wicker (R)	Thad Cochran (R)	3R, 1D	Trump/ Pence (R) ✓
2017	Phil Bryant (R)	Tate Reeves (R)	Delbert; Hosemann (R)	Jim Hood (D)	Stacey Pickering (R)	Lynn Fitch (R)	Cindy; Hyde-Smith (R)	Mike Chaney (R)	33R, 19D	74R, 48D	Roger Wicker (R)	Thad Cochran (R)	3R, 1D	Trump/ Pence (R) ✓
2018	Phil Bryant (R)	Tate Reeves (R)	Delbert; Hosemann (R)	Jim Hood (D)	Stacey Pickering (R)	Lynn Fitch (R)	Cindy; Hyde-Smith (R)	Mike Chaney (R)	33R, 19D	74R, 48D	Roger Wicker (R)	Thad Cochran (R)	3R, 1D	Trump/ Pence (R) ✓
2018	Phil Bryant (R)	Tate Reeves (R)	Delbert; Hosemann (R)	Jim Hood (D)	Stacey Pickering (R)	Lynn Fitch (R)	Andy Gipson (R)	Mike Chaney (R)	33R, 19D	74R, 48D	Roger Wicker (R)	Cindy; Hyde-Smith (R)	3R, 1D	Trump/ Pence (R) ✓
2018	Phil Bryant (R)	Tate Reeves (R)	Delbert; Hosemann (R)	Jim Hood (D)	Shad White (R)	Lynn Fitch (R)	Andy Gipson (R)	Mike Chaney (R)	33R, 19D	74R, 48D	Roger Wicker (R)	Cindy; Hyde-Smith (R)	3R, 1D	Trump/ Pence (R) ✓
2019	Phil Bryant (R)	Tate Reeves (R)	Delbert; Hosemann (R)	Jim Hood (D)	Shad White (R)	Lynn Fitch (R)	Andy Gipson (R)	Mike Chaney (R)	33R, 19D	75R, 45D, 2I (Note: At the filing deadline for the general election, Democratic Rep. Nick Bain (District 2) switched parties to the Republicans, and Democratic Reps. Steve Holland (District 16) and Angela Cockerham (District 96) switched to become Independents;)	Roger Wicker (R)	Cindy; Hyde-Smith (R)	3R, 1D	Trump/ Pence (R) ✓
2020	Tate Reeves (R)	Delbert; Hosemann (R)	Michael Watson (R)	Lynn Fitch (R)	Shad White (R)	David McRae (R)	Andy Gipson (R)	Mike Chaney (R)	36R, 16D	75R, 44D, 3I (Note: After the 2019 election, two Democratic representatives left the party and registered as independents.)	Roger Wicker (R)	Cindy; Hyde-Smith (R)	3R, 1D	Trump/ Pence (R) ✗
2021	Tate Reeves (R)	Delbert; Hosemann (R)	Michael Watson (R)	Lynn Fitch (R)	Shad White (R)	David McRae (R)	Andy Gipson (R)	Mike Chaney (R)	36R, 16D	76R, 44D, 2I (Note: Kevin Horan switched his affiliation from Independent to Republican.)	Roger Wicker (R)	Cindy; Hyde-Smith (R)	3R, 1D	Trump/ Pence (R) ✗
2022	Tate Reeves (R)	Delbert; Hosemann (R)	Michael Watson (R)	Lynn Fitch (R)	Shad White (R)	David McRae (R)	Andy Gipson (R)	Mike Chaney (R)	36R, 16D	77R, 42D, 3I (Note: Jon Ray Lancaster switched parties from Democratic to Republican. Shanda Yates left the Democratic party and registered as an independent.)	Roger Wicker (R)	Cindy; Hyde-Smith (R)	3R, 1D	Trump/ Pence (R) ✗
2023	Tate Reeves (R)	Delbert; Hosemann (R)	Michael Watson (R)	Lynn Fitch (R)	Shad White (R)	David McRae (R)	Andy Gipson (R)	Mike Chaney (R)	36R, 16D	77R, 42D, 3I	Roger Wicker (R)	Cindy; Hyde-Smith (R)	3R, 1D	Trump/ Pence (R) ✗
2024	Tate Reeves (R)	Delbert; Hosemann (R)	Michael Watson (R)	Lynn Fitch (R)	Shad White (R)	David McRae (R)	Andy Gipson (R)	Mike Chaney (R)	36R, 16D	79R, 41D, 2I	Roger Wicker (R)	Cindy; Hyde-Smith (R)	3R, 1D	Trump/ Vance (R) ✓
2025	Tate Reeves (R)	Delbert; Hosemann (R)	Michael Watson (R)	Lynn Fitch (R)	Shad White (R)	David McRae (R)	Andy Gipson (R)	Mike Chaney (R)	36R, 16D	79R, 41D, 2I	Roger Wicker (R)	Cindy; Hyde-Smith (R)	3R, 1D	Trump/ Vance (R) ✓
2026	Tate Reeves (R)	Delbert; Hosemann (R)	Michael Watson (R)	Lynn Fitch (R)	Shad White (R)	David McRae (R)	Andy Gipson (R)	Mike Chaney (R)	34R, 18D	78R, 42D, 2I	Roger Wicker (R)	Cindy; Hyde-Smith (R)	3R, 1D	Trump/ Vance (R) ✓
2027	Tate Reeves (R)	Delbert; Hosemann (R)	Michael Watson (R)	Lynn Fitch (R)	Shad White (R)	David McRae (R)	Andy Gipson (R)	Mike Chaney (R)	34R, 18D	TBD (Note: Pending the December 1, 2026 special election runoffs in House Districts 70 and 77.)	Roger Wicker (R)	Scott Colom (D)	3R, 1D	Trump/ Vance (R) ✓

== See also ==
- Elections in Mississippi
