= Mississippi Insurance Department =

Government agency for the State of Mississippi

Commissioner of Insurance of Mississippi
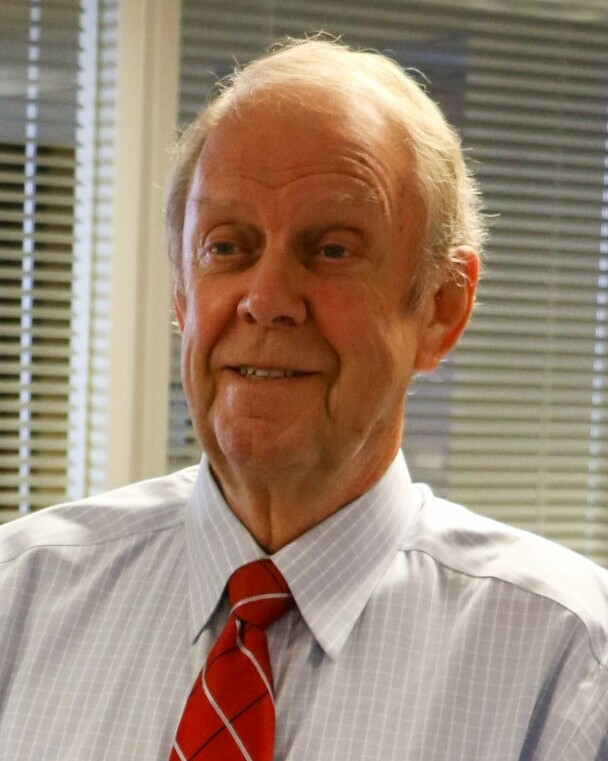
- Incumbent; Mike Chaney
- Term length: 4 years
- Formation: 1903
- Website: mid.ms.gov

The Mississippi Insurance Department was created as a separate department by an Act of the Mississippi Legislature, effective March 1, 1902. The Act provided for the election of an Insurance Commissioner at the general election of 1903 and provided that until the election and qualification of such Insurance Commissioner, the duties of the office should be discharged by the State Auditor of Public Accounts.

== Responsibilities ==
The Mississippi Commissioner of Insurance administers all state laws pertaining to insurance companies, corporations, and their agents and adjustors active in the state. The commissioner licenses and regulates the manufacture and sale of mobile homes and administers the state fire code.

== Commissioners of Insurance, 1903-present ==
Commissioners of Insurance
No.	Insurance Commissioner	Term in office	Party	Ref.
1	William Q. Cole	1903 – 1908	Democratic	
2	T. M. Henry	1908 – 1928	Democratic	
3	Ben Shem Lowry	1928 – 1932	Democratic	
4	George Riley	1932 – 1935	Democratic	
5	J. H. Johnson	1935 – 1936	Democratic	
6	John Sharp Williams III	1936 – 1944	Democratic	
7	Jesse L. White	1944 – 1952	Democratic	
8	Walter Dell Davis	1952 – 1972	Democratic	
9	Evelyn Gandy	1972 – 1976	Democratic	
10	George Dale	1976 – 2008	Democratic	
11	Mike Chaney	2008 – Present	Republican	
