= Carl C. White =

American politician

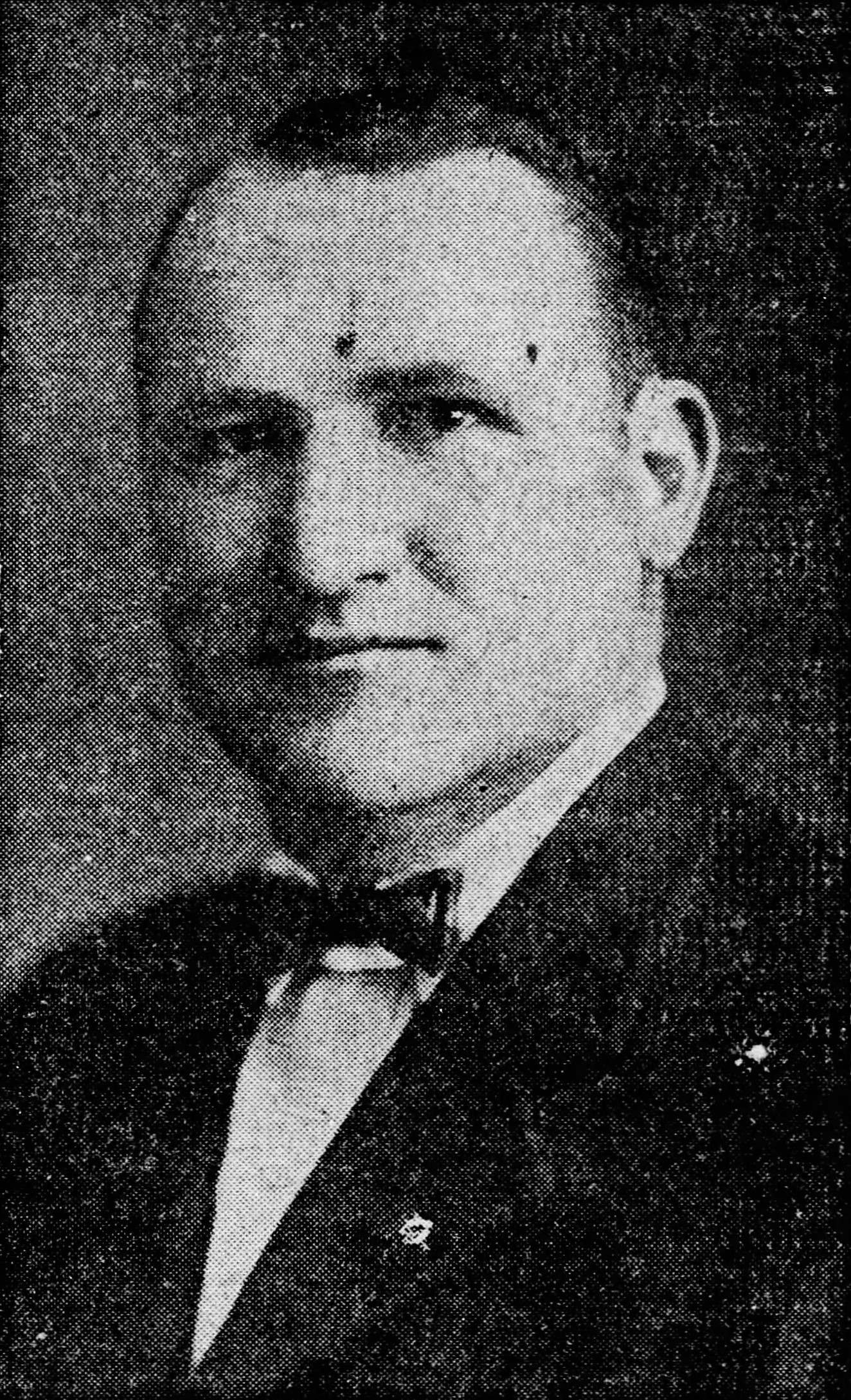
- Photograph of White from a Clarion-Ledger election advertisement, 1935

27th State Auditor of Mississippi
- In office January 16, 1928 – 1932
- Governor: Theodore G. Bilbo
- Preceded by: George Dumah Riley
- Succeeded by: Joe S. Price

Member of the Mississippi House of Representatives from the Grenada County district
- In office 1924–1928

Personal details
- Born: September 14, 1889 Neshoba County, Mississippi, U. S.
- Died: August 26, 1977 (aged 87)
- Party: Democratic

Carl Clement White (September 14, 1889 - August 26, 1977) was an American politician who served in the Mississippi House of Representatives from 1924 to 1928 and as the state auditor of Mississippi from 1928 to 1932.

== Early life ==
Carl Clement White was born on September 14, 1889 in Dixon, Mississippi. He was the son of Lonnie Rufus White (of Scotch-Irish descent). He was of English descent maternally.

== State representative (1924–1928) ==
White announced his campaign for Mississippi state representative in March 1923. He won the Democratic primary and was unopposed in the general election. During his time in the legislature, he was the chairman of the Universities and Colleges Committee.

In August 1926, he announced his intention to run for state auditor of Mississippi. White defeated primary opponent Macey Dinkins by over 40,000 votes, receiving the most votes of any statewide candidate that year. After the primary, auditor-elect White became a pay warrant clerk in the state auditor's office to prepare for the duties of the office. He was unopposed in the general election, and was sworn in as state auditor on January 16, 1928.

== State auditor (1928–1932) ==
White oversaw the collection of a new statewide five-cent per gallon gasoline tax passed by the state legislature in 1929. He threatened to sue the city of Jackson and other cities for refusing to pay the tax.

In September 1929, it was reported that Governor Theodore G. Bilbo requested financial investigations of White, as well as Mississippi secretary of state Walker Wood and state superintendent W. F. Bond. Bilbo's political allies justified the requests as "a thorough house cleaning", while critics alleged that he wanted to amass control of the state departments. In a statement, White welcomed the potential probe, stating that his office was "open at any and all times for probe or inquiry". He was summoned before a joint legislative investigative committee in October 1929, without any specific complaints being filed.

== 1935 state auditor campaign ==
White announced his intention to run for a second term as state auditor on April 21, 1934. He led the first round of the Democratic primary election, receiving 44.5 percent of the vote compared to Carl Craig (34.1 percent) and Grover C. Ballard (21.4 percent). A runoff election between White and Craig was held because no candidate received more than 50 percent of the vote, with Ballard endorsing White after being eliminated. In the runoff, Craig won with 55.5 percent of the vote, receiving almost 40,000 more votes than White.
