= W. J. Miller =

American politician (1856–1938)

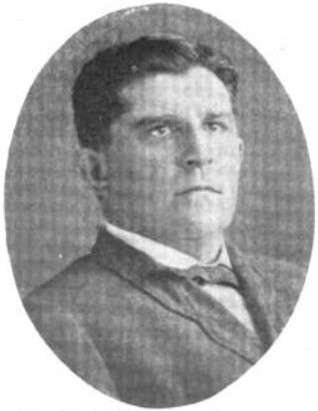
- 1904

29th Mississippi State Treasurer
- In office January 1904 – January 1908
- Governor: James K. Vardaman
- Preceded by: Thad B. Lampton
- Succeeded by: George Robert Edwards

25th State Auditor of Mississippi
- In office January 1920 – January 1924
- Governor: Lee M. Russell
- Preceded by: Robert E. Wilson
- Succeeded by: George Dumah Riley

Personal details
- Born: June 30, 1856 Spartanburg, South Carolina, U.S.
- Died: January 18, 1938 (aged 81) Washington, D.C., U.S.
- Children: 7

William Jones Miller (June 26, 1856 - January 18, 1938) was an American politician. He held several statewide offices in Mississippi, serving as its State Treasurer from 1904 to 1908 and its State Auditor from 1920 to 1924.

== Early life ==
William Jones Miller was born on June 26, 1856, in Spartanburg, South Carolina. He was the son of Pinkney W. Miller (died 1888), a physician, and his wife Isabella Young Miller. Shortly after William's birth, his family moved to Panola County, Mississippi. He attended the public schools of Batesville, Mississippi, studying under G. D. Shands. Miller attended the University of Tennessee but did not graduate.

== Career ==
Miller served as Sheriff of Panola County from 1889 to 1895. From 1900 to 1904, he served as clerk in the office of State Auditor W. Q. Cole (1900–1904). On November 3, 1903, Miller was elected State Treasurer of Mississippi as a Democrat for the 1904–1908 term. In 1911, Miller ran for State Treasurer again. Miller also served as Fire Marshal of Mississippi. He served as Deputy Auditor from 1916 to 1920. In November 1919, Miller was elected State Auditor of Mississippi, and served from 1920 to 1924.

On April 1, 1923, Miller announced his candidacy for State Revenue Agent. His candidacy was endorsed by Governor Lee M. Russell, Senator John Sharp Williams, and Representative B. G. Lowrey, among others. He was elected and served from 1924 to 1928. In 1933, he became the doorman at the United States Senate building. Miller died of pneumonia at 3 AM at Washington, D.C. on January 18, 1938.

== Personal life ==
Miller was a Presbyterian. He was a member of the Freemasons, the Knights of Pythias, the Knights of Honor, and the Elks. He married Lulu Smith (died July 28, 1935) on January 15, 1880. They had seven children: Mabel, Elizabeth, Emma, Robert, Kate, Oliver, and Marguerite.
