= George T. Swann =

American politician (1808–1877)

8th State Auditor of Mississippi
- In office 1847–1851
- Governor: Albert G. Brown; Joseph W. Matthews; John A. Quitman
- Preceded by: J. E. Matthews
- Succeeded by: Daniel R. Russell

President of the Mississippi State Senate
- In office 1846–1847
- Preceded by: Jesse Speight
- Succeeded by: Dabney Lipscomb

Member of the Mississippi State Senate from the Rankin and Simpson Counties district
- In office 1842–1847

Personal details
- Born: July 5, 1808 Powhatan County, Virginia, U.S.
- Died: October 23, 1877 (aged 69) Richmond, Virginia, U.S.
- Party: Democratic

George Taylor Swann (July 5, 1808 – October 23, 1877) was an American lawyer and politician from Mississippi. He was the 8th State Auditor of Mississippi, serving from 1847 to 1851, and also served in the Mississippi State Senate and was its President from 1846 to 1847.

== Biography ==
Swann was born on July 5, 1808 in Powhatan County, Virginia. He graduated from Hampden–Sydney College in 1826, and studied law and started practicing in Virginia. He moved to Brandon, Mississippi in 1836, practicing law and editing a local newspaper.

He started serving in the Mississippi State Senate in 1842. He was a Democrat and represented Rankin and Simpson Counties. He was voted President of the Senate in 1846 and served in that role for two years. He was elected as state auditor and served two terms in that office from 1847 to 1851. He became president of the Jackson and Brandon Railroad and Bridge Company in 1847. Swann then served on the Central Southern Rights Association committee in 1851, and was Clerk of the High Court of Errors and Appeals from 1856 to 1858. He then returned to law practice.

In 1865 he was appointed as Judge of the Special Equity Court by Mississippi Provisional Governor William L. Sharkey. In 1867, he was appointed Clerk of the United States District Court for the Southern District of Mississippi, and held that position until his death in 1877.

== Personal ==
Swann married Mary Lee Patton (d. 1851) in Danville, Virginia in 1834, and they had seven children. Swann then married Judy E. Randolph (d. 1877) of Richmond, Virginia in 1856. Swann and his wife Judy traveled to Virginia in the summer of 1877 hoping to restore their failing health. His wife died there on July 8, 1877, and Swann followed her on October 23, 1877, at the age of 69, in Richmond.

== External ==
- Swann related documents at The Civil War and Reconstruction Governors of Mississippi
