= W. D. Holder =

American politician

William Dunbar Holder
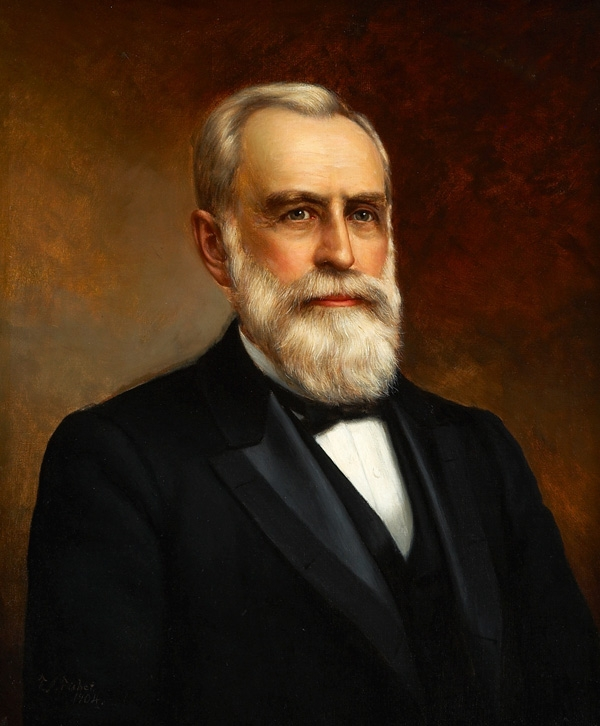
- Portrait of William D. Holder by Andres Molinary

Member of the Confederate House of Representatives for Mississippi
- In office May 2, 1864 – March 18, 1865

19th State Auditor of Mississippi
- In office January 1896 – January 1900
- Governor: Anselm J. McLaurin
- Preceded by: W. W. Stone
- Succeeded by: W. Q. Cole

Personal details
- Born: March 6, 1824 Franklin County, Tennessee
- Died: April 26, 1900 (aged 76) Jackson, Mississippi
- Party: Democratic
- Occupation: Lawyer

Military service
- Allegiance: Confederate States of America
- Branch/service: Confederate States Army; Army of Northern Virginia
- Years of service: 1861-1864
- Rank: Colonel
- Commands: 17th Mississippi Infantry Regiment
- Battles/wars: American Civil War

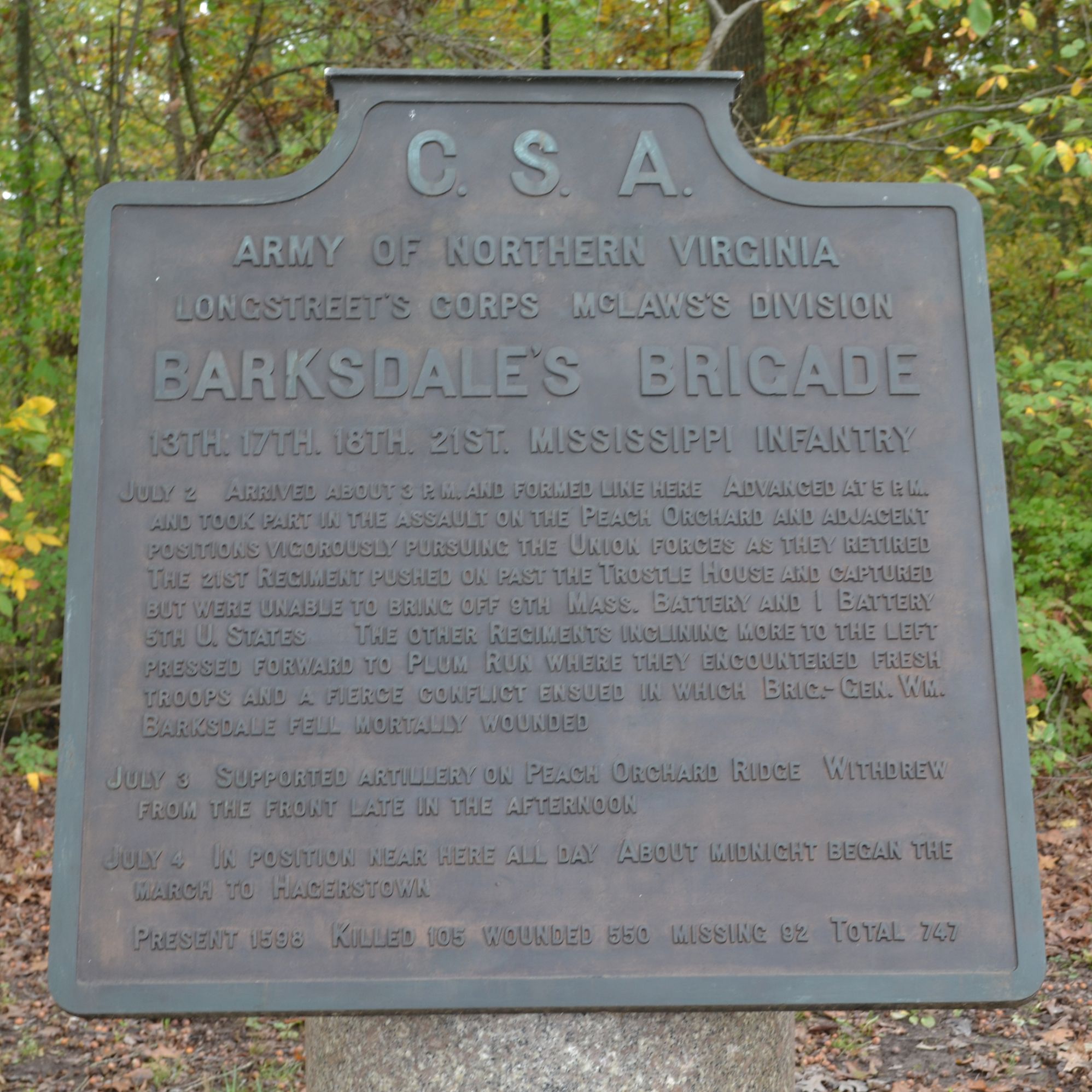
Memorial to Barksdale's Mississippi Brigade at Gettysburg National Military Park

William Dunbar Holder (March 6, 1824 – April 26, 1900) was a prominent Confederate politician and soldier. He was a colonel in the Army of Northern Virginia, represented Mississippi in the Confederate States Congress, and also served as the 19th State Auditor of Mississippi from 1896 to 1900.

== Biography ==
Holder was born in Franklin County, Tennessee, but later moved to Mississippi at age 14. He served one term in the state legislature in 1853.

In 1861, following Mississippi's secession from the Union, he enlisted in the army and was elected captain of the Quitman Greys, Company C, 17th Mississippi Infantry Regiment, which became part of the Army of Northern Virginia. Holder was promoted to colonel of his regiment on April 26, 1862 and was wounded in the Battle of Malvern Hill in July.

Holder was wounded again at the Battle of Gettysburg in July, 1863, where he commanded the 17th Mississippi as part of Barksdale's Mississippi Brigade. In a letter to The Clarion-Ledger in October 1886, Holder wrote the following,

Barksdale’s brigade, in line of battle on the day in question, stood thus: Extreme left, 13th Mississippi Regiment, Colonel Carter; 17th, Colonel Holder; 18th, Colonel Griffin; 21st, Colonel Humphreys. Colonel Griffin was wounded in the leg, Colonel Carter killed on the field, and Gen. Barksdale fell in the midst of his gallant old 13th Regiment. ... They dared to go where duty called, and knew by the crucial test of many an ensanguined field, that their regiments would stand by them to the bitter end.

Disabled by his wounds, Holder resigned his army commission January 20, 1864. He then represented his home state in the Second Confederate Congress from 1864 to 1865. After the war Holder served as the State Auditor of Mississippi from 1896 to 1900.

He died in Jackson, Mississippi on April 26, 1900.

== Family ==
He married Catharine Theresa Bowles (1837–1887) and they had six sons and one daughter.
