= Elias J. Smith =

American politician (1858–1917)

22nd State Auditor of Mississippi
- In office January 1908 – January 1912
- Governor: Edmond Noel
- Preceded by: Thomas Monroe Henry
- Succeeded by: Duncan L. Thompson

Personal details
- Born: November 7, 1858 Chickasaw County, Mississippi, U. S.
- Died: January 19, 1917 (aged 58) Jackson, Mississippi, U. S.
- Party: Democratic

Elias Jefferson Smith (November 7, 1858 - January 19, 1917) was an American state official. He served as State Auditor of Mississippi from 1908 to 1912.

== Early life ==
Elias Jefferson Smith was born on November 7, 1858, near Buena Vista, Mississippi. He was the son of Civil War veteran John Edward Smith and Martha Elizabeth Brewer. He was of English descent. Smith attended the County Schools of Chickasaw County and a course at Leidin's Business College in Memphis.

== Career ==
Smith moved to Jackson, Mississippi, in 1886, and became a general bookkeeper in the office of State Auditor W. W. Stone. Smith served as City Auditor of Jackson, Mississippi, for 6 years. He served in the State Auditor's Office of Mississippi for 17 years. During the term of Thomas Monroe Henry (1904-1908), Smith served as deputy auditor. In 1907, Smith defeated T. R. Maxwell in the Democratic Primary for State Auditor of Mississippi. On November 5, 1907, Smith was elected as a Democrat to serve as State Auditor of Mississippi for the 1908-1912 term. In 1916, Smith was appointed chief office deputy by Sheriff W. S. Wells. Smith died in a car accident on January 19, 1917, in Jackson.

== Personal life ==
Smith was a Methodist by religion. He was a member of the Knights of Pythias, the Woodmen of the World, and the Order of the Elks. Smith married Minnie Troup on November 8, 1882. They had one child, who predeceased Smith.
