= Dabney Lipscomb =

American politician (1803–1850)

Dabney Lipscomb (May 6, 1803 - June 22, 1850) was a medical doctor, an academic and state legislator in Mississippi. He served as president of the Mississippi Senate. During his term he fell seriously ill and John Isaac Guion took over his duties. During a recess the governor resigned and Guion became governor pro tempore.

He represented Lowndes County, Mississippi, and served as president of the Senate from 1848 to 1851. He was a faculty member and trustee of Mississippi Industrial Institute and College. He wrote a history of the institution.

His son William Lowndes Lipscomb was a surgeon whose history of Columbus County was published posthumously. Lipscomb also had prominent grandchildren including literature professor and author Dabney Lipscomb.

He died June 22, 1850, whilst at home in Columbus, Mississippi, he died of chronic diarrhoea which he had been suffering with for months. He was honored in the Senate on Monday November 18, 1850.
