= Hamp King =

American auditor (1909–1991)

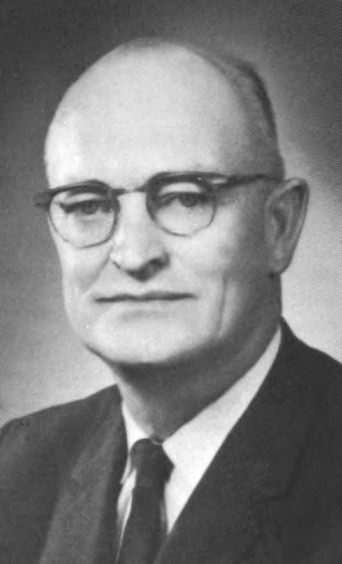

36th State Auditor of Mississippi
- In office January 1964 – 1984
- Governor: Paul B. Johnson, Jr. John Bell Williams; Bill Waller; Cliff Finch; William F. Winter
- Preceded by: William Donelson Neal
- Succeeded by: Ray Mabus

Personal details
- Born: October 1, 1909 Heidelberg, Mississippi, U.S.
- Died: May 8, 1991 (aged 81)
- Political party: Democratic Party
- Spouse: Douglas Banks
- Children: 2
- Education: University of Mississippi; Nashville YMCA Night Law School

William Hampton King (October 1, 1909 – May 8, 1991) was an American auditor who served as State Auditor of Mississippi from 1964 to 1984.

== Early life ==
W. Hampton King was born on October 1, 1909, in Heidelberg, Mississippi. He attended local public schools and Hinds Junior College before earning a bachelor's degree at the University of Mississippi and a graduate degree from the Nashville YMCA Night Law School. He became a certified public accountant in 1955. He married Douglas Banks in July 1938 and had two daughters with her. After living in Tennessee and North Carolina, he returned to Mississippi in 1947, moving to Cleveland. In 1956, he moved to Jackson.

== Career ==
King worked variously as a schoolteacher, social worker, concrete inspector, and cannery manager before being hired by the Mississippi State Department of Audit in 1953 as a field auditor. In 1956, he was made an assistant director before being promoted to director six years later. King ran for the office of State Auditor in 1963, defeating Dewey Mark Norton in the Democratic primary. He was sworn-in in January 1964, becoming the first certified public accountant to hold the office. He was reelected to the office four times, serving until 1984. He reportedly favored Mason Shelby as his successor, but Shelby was defeated in the 1983 Democratic primary by Ray Mabus. At the time he left the auditorship, the office was delinquent for 581 fiscal years worth of audits.

== Later life ==
King died from heart failure on May 8, 1991. The Mississippi Society of Certified Accountants created the Hamp King Award—named in honor of the auditor—to recognize talented accounting students.

== Works cited ==
- Crockett, James R. (2003). Operation Pretense: The FBI's Sting on County Corruption in Mississippi. Jackson: University Press of Mississippi. ISBN 9781578064960.
- Mississippi Official and Statistical Register 1980–1984. Jackson: Mississippi Secretary of State. 1981. OCLC 1131544573.

Political offices
Preceded by William Donelson Neal	State Auditor of Mississippi; 1964 – 1984	Succeeded by Ray Mabus
