= William Donelson Neal =

American politician (1908–1994)

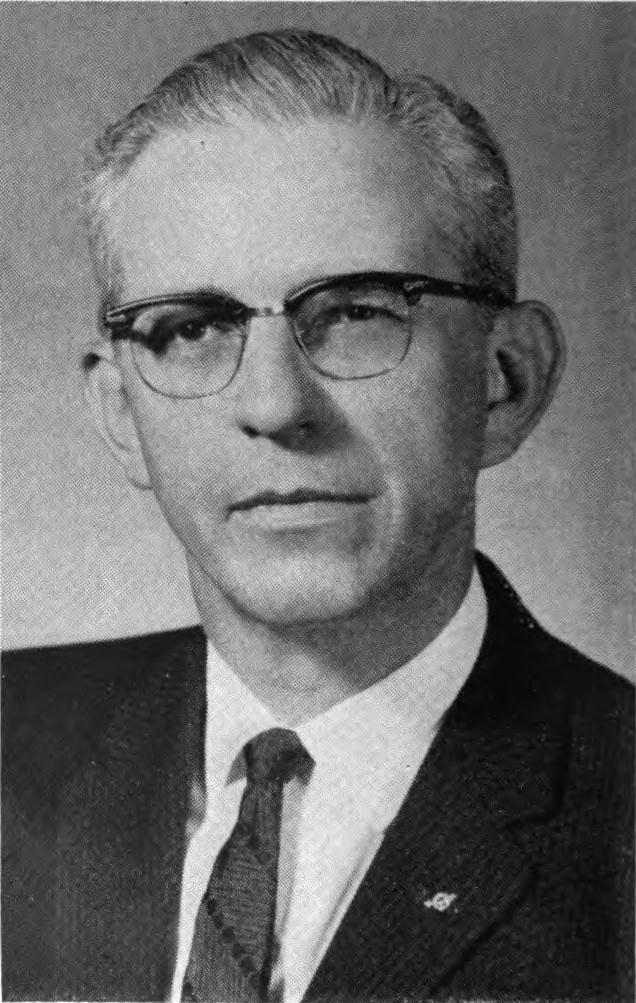
- c. 1960

33rd and 35th State Auditor of Mississippi
- In office January 1960 – January 1964
- Governor: Ross Barnett
- Preceded by: E. Boyd Golding
- Succeeded by: Hamp King
- In office January 1952 – January 1956
- Governor: Hugh L. White
- Preceded by: Carl Craig
- Succeeded by: E. Boyd Golding

Personal details
- Born: June 18, 1908 Carroll County, Mississippi, U.S.
- Died: December 18, 1994 (aged 86) Jackson, Mississippi, U.S.
- Party: Democratic
- Children: 3

William Donelson Neal (June 18, 1908 – December 18, 1994) was an American who served as the 33rd and 35th State Auditor of Mississippi, serving from 1952 to 1956 and from 1960 to 1964.

== Early life ==
William Donelson Neal was born in Carroll County, Mississippi, on June 18, 1908. He was one of two sons of Charles Albert Neal (1875-1949), and Katherine Clyde Mullen Neal. Charles was a Spanish-American War veteran who worked in the Mississippi State Auditor's office. William's mother died when he was young and his father remarried in 1911. William attended Millsaps College. He then graduated from MississippI College in 1929. He worked as a teacher in Gloster, Mississippi, and later Carroll County.

== Career ==
In 1938, he purchased the Carrollton newspaper The Conservative, which he published until 1957. His wife Mildred edited the paper. He sold the newspaper to Billy McMillian in the early 1960s.

Circa 1931 Neal was elected Secretary of the Carrollton Democratic Executive Committee and served for ten years. In 1934, Neal became the Town Clerk of Carrollton, and he served until 1942. He was then elected Superintendent of Education for Carroll County, and served two terms from 1940 to 1948. He also served on the Board of Aldermen of Carrollton.

In 1949, Neal joined the Mississippi State Auditor's department as a Field Auditor.

=== 1951-1955 ===
In June 1951, he was qualified as a candidate for State Auditor of Mississippi. He cited his experience as a local official and as a field auditor as his qualification for the office. In the first Democratic primary on August 7, his opponents were William P. Davis of Brandon, W. E. Holcomb of Jackson, and Tom G. Roper of Columbia. Neal received the plurality of votes in the first primary. In the second primary on August 28, he faced Roper only. Neal won the primary, receiving 230,501 votes compared to Roper's 147,534. Neal was the only candidate on the November 6, 1951 general election and therefore won by default.

He was elected and served from 1952 to 1956. In November 1952, in order to increase funding for the school systems and close the gap between funding of segregated white and black schools, Neal suggested compelling county administrations to plant forests in Sixteenth Section lands and make money from selective cutting of timber. According to Neal's plan, the profits, of which he estimated would be $15 million, would be given to the school system within 20 years. In 1953, Neal worked with the Mississippi State Legislature to write a bill "which established a minimum program for education for children" in Mississippi public schools. In July 1955, Neal's administration as auditor was criticized by former auditor and candidate for election Carl Craig. Neal issued a public statement on July 5 saying that Craig's claims were false. Neal cited his imposition of a new merit system for the Department of Audit as evidence.

From 1956 to 1960, Neal served as Director of Finance of the Mississippi State Education Commission. He announced he was running for Auditor again in September 1958.

=== 1959-1973 ===
He was re-elected Auditor, unopposed, in 1959 for the 1960-1964 term. In 1961, Neal announced his belief that Mississippi needed a centralized accounting office. During this term, Neal worked with the Legislature again to pass a bill, this time creating a general accounting office in Mississippi's Department of Public Accounts, in 1962. In October 1963, Neal used taxes from tobacco to pay off expenditures in the auditor's office.

After his second term ended, Neal became a statistician with Mississippi's Department of Public Accounts. In 1971 he served as a Master on a panel of 3 federal judges. In 1972, he also became a member of the Governor's Highway Study Commission. In May 1973, Neal retired from public service, and a ceremony was held for him in Jackson.

== Personal life and death ==
Neal was Grand Master of the Masonic Lodge of Mississippi from 1948 to 1949. He was a Baptist. On December 23, 1929, in Jackson, he married Mildred Carmichael (January 19, 1909 - June 25, 1999), whom he had met at Mississippi College. They had three sons: William Donelson Jr., Ben Carmichael, and John Rice. The family moved from Carrollton to Jackson in 1952. Neal died of a heart attack in a hospital in Jackson, Mississippi, on December 18, 1994. He was survived by two of his sons, 11 grandchildren, and 29 great-grandchildren.
