= E. Boyd Golding =

American educator (1914–2008)

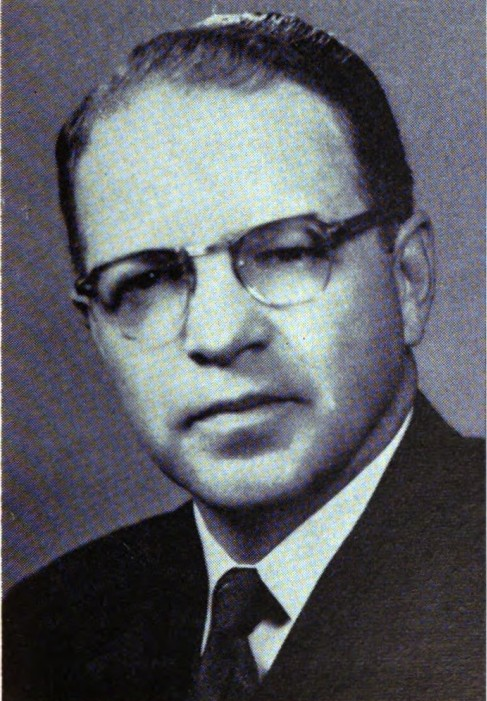
- 1956

34th State Auditor of Mississippi
- In office January 1956 – January 1960
- Preceded by: William Donelson Neal
- Succeeded by: William Donelson Neal

Personal details
- Born: January 20, 1914 Webster County, Mississippi, U.S.
- Died: August 27, 2008 (aged 94) Benton, Mississippi, U.S.
- Party: Democratic

Eugene Boyd Golding (January 20, 1914 – August 27, 2008) was an American educator who served as State Auditor of Mississippi from 1956 to 1960.

== Early life ==
Eugene Boyd Golding was born on January 20, 1914, a farm in Webster County, Mississippi. He was the fifth of ten children of farmer Dewitt Golding and Lillian Gertrude Partridge Golding. Golding graduated from Holmes Junior College. He then graduated from Mississippi College with a B. A. degree. He was a member of the varsity debate team in both colleges.

== Career ==
After graduating from Mississippi College, Golding became a teacher. He was first a principal and teacher at Mars Hill High School in Amite County for two years. In 1939, he was elected Superintendent of the Bude High School. He then attended and graduated from the Army Air Forces Technical School, and then worked there as a teacher for three years. He was elected Superintendent of the Benton High Schools in 1947 and served for eight years. Around this time, Golding received a Master's Degree in School Administration from Mississippi State University.

On August 2, 1955, Golding faced Carl Craig in the first Democratic primary for State Auditor. Golding won, receiving 229,920 votes compared to Craig's 182,800. He then won the general election unopposed. Under the administration of Governor Ross Barnett (1960–1964), Golding served as Deputy Commissioner of Public Safety.

In 1963, Golding ran for the position of State Superintendent of Education. His platform encouraged "The Three R's", vocational education, improved teacher salary, continued segregation, and independence from federal control via rejection of federal aid. Golding lost the second Democratic primary by a close margin (239,425 to 214,240) to incumbent Jack Tubb. On June 29, 1967, Golding announced he was running again for the position. The segregation plank was absent from the published campaign platform. In the first Democratic primary, Golding received 289,446 votes, while opponent Garvin Johnston received 353,695 votes. He received a PhD in School Administration from Mississippi State University at this time.

Golding died on August 27, 2008, in Benton, Mississippi.

== Personal life ==
Golding was a member of the Baptist Church. On July 6, 1939, he married Winnie Craft, a teacher. On June 24, 2004, aged 90, he married 73-year-old Ramona Jean Ellis. He had two stepchildren through this marriage.
