= Thomas Monroe Henry =

American politician (1857–1930)

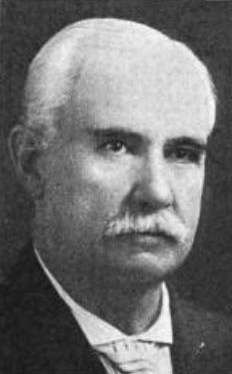

21st State Auditor of Mississippi
- In office January 1904 – January 1908
- Governor: James K. Vardaman
- Preceded by: William Q. Cole
- Succeeded by: Elias Jefferson Smith

Insurance Commissioner of Mississippi
- In office January 1908 – January 1928
- Governor: Edmond Noel; Earl L. Brewer; Theodore G. Bilbo; Lee M. Russell; Henry L. Whitfield; Dennis Murphree
- Preceded by: William Q. Cole
- Succeeded by: Ben Shem Lowry

Personal details
- Born: February 4, 1857 Hillsboro, Mississippi
- Died: June 28, 1930 (aged 73) Jackson, Mississippi
- Party: Democrat

Thomas Monroe Henry (February 4, 1857 - June 28, 1930) was the state auditor of Mississippi from 1904 to 1908, as well as the insurance commissioner of Mississippi from 1908 until 1928.

== Early life ==
Thomas Monroe Henry was born on February 4, 1857, in Hillsboro, Scott County, Mississippi. He was the second son of Patrick Henry, a Confederate lieutenant during the Civil War, and Mary Anne (Chambers) Henry. Thomas attended the public schools of Scott County. He left school when he was fourteen and started working. He was a clerk and a bookkeeper at Forest and Morton until 1878, and was a bookkeeper and merchant in Brookhaven from 1878 to 1883.

== Public office ==
Henry was appointed revenue and insurance clerk in the Mississippi State auditor's office by state auditor Sylvester Gwin. He was re-appointed in this office by Gwin's successor W. W. Stone. He was appointed to the Deputy Auditor position under auditors W. D. Holder and W. Q. Cole.

=== State Auditor ===
Henry was elected to become the State Auditor of Mississippi in November 1903. He served in this office from 1904 until 1908.

=== Insurance commissioner ===
Henry was elected to the office of Insurance Commissioner of Mississippi, without opposition, in November 1907. He was re-elected in 1911 and 1915, the latter with little opposition. He continued serving until 1928, when he was defeated in the primary by B. S. Lowry.

== Later life ==
After losing the election in 1927, Henry continued being engaged in the insurance business. He died after a long illness on June 28, 1930, in Jackson, Mississippi.

== Personal life ==
Henry was a Democrat. He was a Presbyterian. He was married twice, and had two children from his first marriage.
