= Robert E. Wilson (politician) =

American state official (1856–1921)

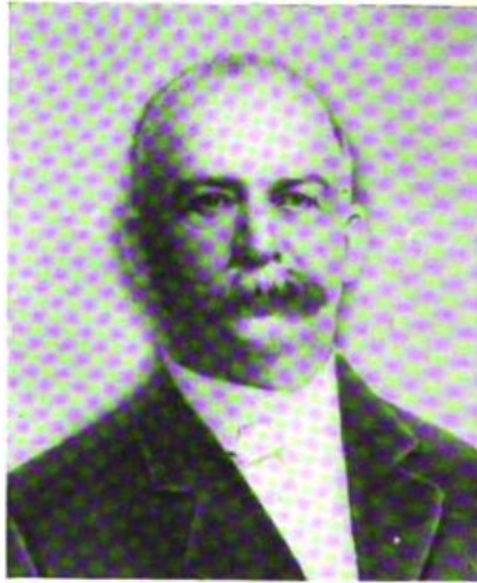
- c. 1917

24th State Auditor of Mississippi
- In office January 17, 1916 – January 1920
- Governor: Lee M. Russell
- Preceded by: Duncan L. Thompson
- Succeeded by: W. J. Miller

Personal details
- Born: March 30, 1856 Madison County, Mississippi, U.S.
- Died: January 12, 1921 (aged 64) Jackson, Mississippi, U.S.
- Party: Democratic
- Relations: Robert Lowry (father-in-law)
- Children: 4

Robert E. Wilson (March 30, 1856 - January 12, 1921) was an American state official. He served as State Auditor of Mississippi from 1916 to 1920.

== Early life ==
Robert E. Wilson was born in Madison County, Mississippi, on March 30, 1856. He was the son of Joseph Wilson (died 1876), an immigrant from County Donegal who served in the Confederate Army, and Eleanor Evans Wilson. He had a brother, Edgar S. Wilson. Robert grew up doing work on his parents' farm. He attended country schools and later, the Brandon Male Academy for three years.

== Career ==
Wilson worked as a salesman and bookkeeper in Brandon. He then moved to Jackson, where he worked as a clerk during the second term of State Auditor Sylvester Gwin. Wilson then served as the Secretary of the Constitutional Convention of 1890. He also served as the Clerk of the Mississippi House of Representatives during the 1890 and 1892 sessions. He served as a Secretary in the 1892 Democratic National Convention. He resigned from the clerkship in order to serve as Registrar in the United States Land Office during the second term of President Grover Cleveland (1893-1897). In 1915, after spending time out of office, Wilson announced his candidacy for the Democratic nomination for State Auditor of Mississippi. On August 3, 1915, Wilson won the Democratic primary, winning by over 10,000 votes and taking 57 out of 80 counties. He won the November general election and served the 1916-1920 term. After his term, Wilson unsuccessfully ran in the primary for Mayor of Jackson.

== Personal life ==
Wilson was Methodist by religion. In 1879, married Rosa Lowry (died 1915), the daughter of Governor Robert Lowry. They had four children together: Robert G., Lee J., Rosa L., and Nell. Wilson died at his Jackson residence at midnight on January 12, 1921.
