= Henry Musgrove =

American politician (died 1879)

17th Secretary of State of Mississippi
- In office September 10, 1869 – December 23, 1869
- Governor: Adelbert Ames
- Preceded by: Alexander Warner
- Succeeded by: James Lynch

15th State Auditor of Mississippi
- In office 1869–1874
- Governor: Adelbert Ames; James L. Alcorn; Ridgley C. Powers
- Preceded by: Thomas T. Swann
- Succeeded by: William H. Gibbs

Personal details
- Died: August 1, 1879 Chicago, Illinois
- Party: Republican

Henry Musgrove was a politician in Mississippi during the Reconstruction era. He served as the Mississippi state auditor from 1869 until 1874, and as the Secretary of State of Mississippi in 1869. He ran on the Republican ticket with officials including James L. Alcorn who was elected governor. He moved to Mississippi in 1866 from Indiana.

He was involved in controversial issuance of currency. A northerner, he took part in fusionist tax protests after his time in office.

Musgrove was appointed to be the Secretary of State of Mississippi by Mississippi's "Special Order No. 195" on September 10, 1869, succeeding Alexander Warner. He resigned from the position in December 1869 and became the State Auditor.

He died after a long illness August 1, 1879 in Chicago. At the time of his death he has been working as a banker and was a significant property owner.
