= Joe S. Price =

American politician (1876–1955)

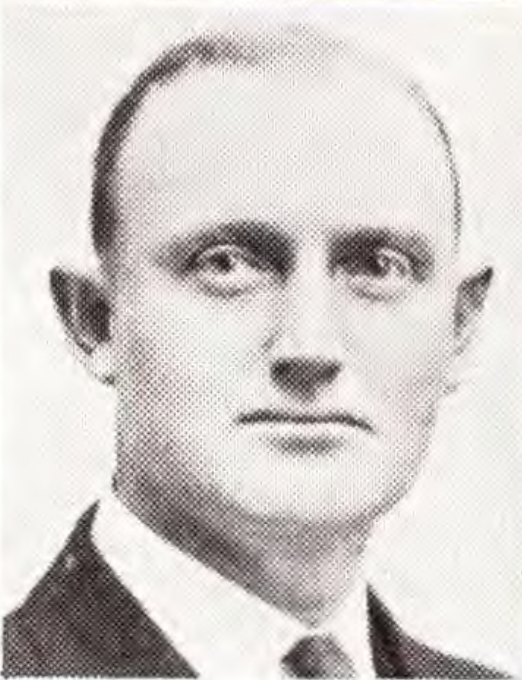
- Price, c. 1931

28th State Auditor of Mississippi
- In office January 1932 – January 1936
- Governor: Martin Sennet Conner
- Preceded by: Carl C. White
- Succeeded by: Carl Craig

Member of the Mississippi House of Representatives from the Chickasaw County district
- In office January 1928 – January 1932 Serving with H. F. Sanderson

Personal details
- Born: Joseph Sylvester Price; May 1, 1876 Lebanon, Missouri, US
- Died: March 25, 1955 (aged 78) Jackson, Mississippi, US
- Party: Democratic

Joseph Sylvester Price (May 1, 1876 – March 25, 1955) was an American insurance agent and politician in Mississippi. He served as the State Auditor of Mississippi from 1932 to 1936 and served in the Mississippi House of Representatives from 1928 to 1932.

== Biography ==
Price was born on May 1, 1876, in Lebanon, Missouri. He had four sisters: Mable, Lula, Effie, and another, who married Preston Woods. Price moved to Chickasaw County, Mississippi, circa 1895. He was a teacher in public schools for fifteen years. He then worked as an insurance agent and farmer. He was elected to represent Chickasaw County in the Mississippi House of Representatives for the 1928-1932 term. During that term, he served on the following committees: Banks & Banking; Education; Insurance; Public Printing; Roads, Ferries, and Bridges; and Universities & Colleges. He moved to Jackson shortly after his term.

In 1931, Price was elected to the office of State Auditor of Mississippi. He defeated Clint E. Dorroh and Samuel B. Herron in the election. He served the term from 1932 to 1936. In February 1935, Price announced his campaign for Secretary of State of Mississippi. His main opponent was incumbent Walker Wood. Wood won the August 27 Democratic primary. In 1935, Price became an agent for the Mutual Benefit Life Insurance company.

== Personal life ==
Price was a member of the local Baptist church, where he served as Chairman of the Board of Deacons. He was a member of the Masons and the Knights of Pythias. He married and had one daughter, Lena Scott Price. He died on March 25, 1955, aged 78, at his residence in Jackson, Mississippi.
