= Duncan L. Thompson =

American accountant (1880–1930)

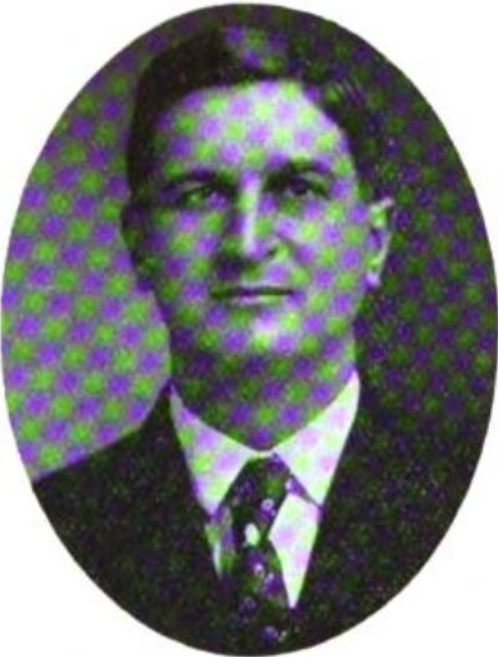
- c. 1912

23rd State Auditor of Mississippi
- In office January 1912 – January 1916
- Governor: Earl L. Brewer
- Preceded by: Elias J. Smith
- Succeeded by: Robert E. Wilson

Personal details
- Born: January 25, 1880 Enid, Mississippi, U.S.
- Died: July 17, 1930 (aged 50) Jackson, Mississippi, U.S.
- Party: Democratic

Duncan Lafayette Thompson (January 25, 1880 - July 17, 1930) was an American accountant and state official. He served as the State Auditor of Mississippi from 1912 to 1916.

== Early life ==
Duncan Lafayette Thompson was born on January 25, 1880, in Enid, Mississippi. He was the son of Richard John Thompson, a former soldier for the Confederate Army, and Nora Burch. He was of Scottish descent paternally. His siblings included four brothers: W. G., S. M., N. R., and Burch. Thompson attended the public schools of Enid and the Webb School. He also attended the University of Mississippi, where he finished his sophomore year.

== Career ==
Thompson was a Certified Public Accountant for the state of Mississippi. Thompson served as Deputy Sheriff of Tallahatchie County from 1900 to 1904. He then worked in the State Auditor's office as a settlement clerk from 1904 to 1908. Thompson then served as Deputy Auditor of Mississippi from 1908 to 1912. On November 7, 1912, he was elected unopposed to the office of State Auditor as a Democrat for the 1912–1916 term. In 1916, Thompson was appointed Chairman of the Mississippi State Tax Commission. He served in this position until 1924. In the 1920s he became involved in "private legal and land transfer work", and he was also admitted to the bar late in his life.

== Personal life and death ==
Thompson never married. He was a member of the Masons, the Knights of Pythias, and the Woodmen of the World. Thompson was a Baptist by religion. He died in a Jackson hospital on July 17, 1930, and was survived by four brothers.
