= State Auditor of Mississippi =

Elected official in the executive branch of Mississippi's state government

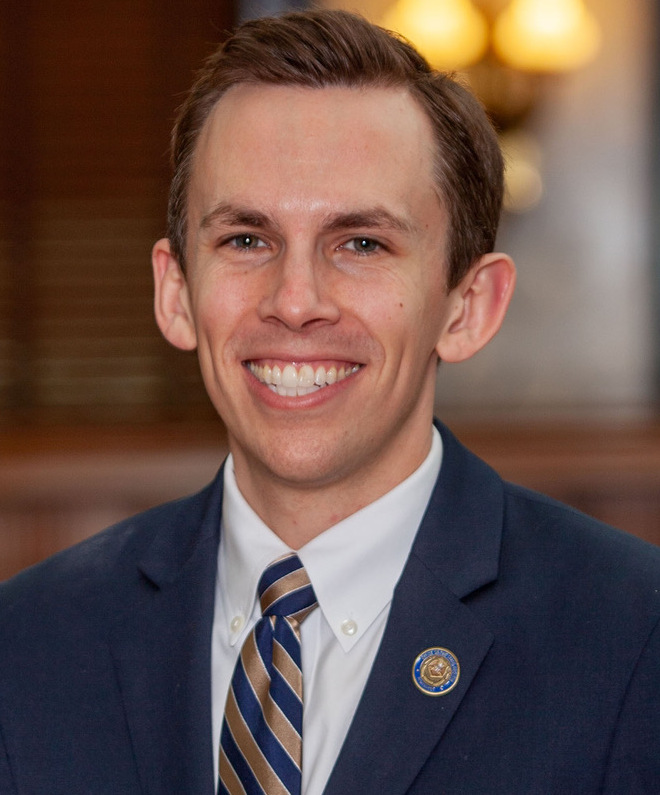
- Incumbent; Shad White since July 17, 2018
- Term length: Four years, renewable, no term limits
- Inaugural holder: John R. Girault
- Formation: 1817
- Website: osa.state.ms.us

The state auditor of Mississippi is an elected official in the executive branch of Mississippi's state government. The duty of the state auditor is to ensure accountability in the use of funds appropriated by the state legislature by inspecting and reporting on the expenditure of the public funds.

Shad White is the incumbent state auditor of Mississippi as of 2025. He assumed office on July 17, 2018.

== History of the office ==
The position of state auditor was enumerated as part of the executive branch in Mississippi's first constitution in 1817. The office was filled by the choice of the Mississippi Legislature. The first auditor, John R. Girault, was elected on December 19, 1817. The 1832 constitution stipulated that the auditor was to be popularly elected to serve a two-year term. The 1869 Constitution extended the term to four years.

The fourth Constitution of Mississippi, ratified in 1890, made the state auditor ineligible to hold consecutive terms, and barred the state auditor and state treasurer from immediately succeeding each other. This measure was implemented as an effort to prevent collusion between the two officeholders, after a series of embezzlements and misuses of public funds during the Reconstruction era. A 1966 constitutional amendment lifted the prohibitions, making the state auditor eligible to serve consecutive terms. In 1986, the Constitution Committee of the Mississippi House voted to approve a proposal to limit the state auditor to a ten-year tenure, but the measure was rejected by the full House after initially being passed by the state senate. The 1890 constitution also required the auditor to publish a report of all expenses incurred by the legislature during its sessions, though this responsibility was transferred to a different officer in 1989.

In 1993 some employees in the Department of Audit's investigative division were made law enforcement officers. Originally restricted to exercising the power of arrest only after an individual had been indicted by a court following an auditing investigation, in 2003 the officers were granted full arrest powers and thus permitted to arrest anyone for any crime they detected in the course of their duties.

Hamp King, who held the office from 1964 to 1984, was the first certified public accountant to serve as state auditor. Ray Mabus, who became auditor in 1984, raised the public profile of the office through a crackdown on corruption. The incumbent auditor, Shad White, assumed office on July 17, 2018.

== Powers, duties, and structure ==
Under Article 5, Section 134, of the Mississippi Constitution, the state auditor is elected every four years. Candidates for the office must meet the same constitutional qualifications as candidates for the position of secretary of state; they must be at least 25 years old and have lived in the state for at least five years. Auditors are elected to a four-year term without term limits.

The state auditor is responsible for auditing state agencies, county governments, school districts, and tertiary educational institutions. They also conduct data audits for public schools and monitor state agencies' inventory. They advise local governments on accounting matters in accordance with Generally Accepted Accounting Principles and relevant laws, and investigate misuse of public funds. The office lacks the ability to prosecute cases of criminal wrongdoing in court and, in such instances where wrongdoing is believed to have occurred, typically turns over its findings to other prosecutors.

The Department of Audit has approximately 150 employees, including about 40 certified public accountants. It has four divisions: Financial and Compliance Audit Division, Investigative Division, Government Accountability Division, and the Technical Assistance Division. The auditor's salary was $90,000 per year, but increased to $150,000 annually in 2024.

== List of auditors ==
Source: Mississippi Official & Statistical Register

=== Territorial auditors (1798–1817) ===
- Charles B. Howell
- Beverly R. Grayson
- Park Walton

=== State auditors (1817–present) ===
#	Image	Name	Term of office	Party
1		John R. Girault	1817–1819	
2		John Richards	1819–1822	
3		Hiram G. Runnels	1822–1830	
4		Thomas B. J. Hadley	1830–1833	
5		John H. Mallory	1833–1837	
6		A. B. Saunders	1837–1842	
7		J. E. Matthews	1842–1847	
8		George T. Swann	1847–1851	
9		Daniel R. Russell	1851–1855	
10		Madison McAfee	1855–1859	
11		Erasmus Burt	1859–1861	
12		A. B. Dilworth	1861–1862	
13		A. J. Gillespie	1862–1865	
14		Thomas T. Swann	1865–1869	
15		Henry Musgrove	1869–1874	
16		William H. Gibbs	1874–1876	
17		Sylvester Gwin	1878–1886	
18		W. W. Stone	1886–1896	Democratic
19		W. D. Holder	1896–1900	Democratic
20		William Qualls Cole	1900–1904	Democratic
21		Thomas Monroe Henry	1904–1908	Democratic
22		Elias Jefferson Smith	1908–1912	Democratic
23		Duncan Lafayette Thompson	1912–1916	Democratic
24		Robert E. Wilson	1916–1920	Democratic
25		W. J. Miller	1920–1924	Democratic
26		George Dumah Riley	1924–1928	Democratic
27		Carl C. White	1928–1932	Democratic
28		Joe S. Price	1932–1936	Democratic
29		Carl Craig	1936–1940	Democratic
30		J. M. Causey	1940–1944	Democratic
31		Bert J. Barnett	1944–1948	Democratic
32		Carl Craig	1948–1952	Democratic
33		William Donelson Neal	1952–1956	Democratic
34		E. Boyd Golding	1956–1960	Democratic
35		William Donelson Neal	1960–1964	Democratic
36		Hamp King	1964–1984	Democratic
37		Ray Mabus	1984–1988	Democratic
38		Pete Johnson	1988–1992	
39		Steve Patterson	1992–1996	Democratic
40		Phil Bryant	1996–2008	Republican
41		Stacey Pickering	2008–2018	Republican
42		Shad White	2018–present	Republican

== Works cited ==
- Busbee, Westley F. Jr. (2014). Mississippi: A History (second ed.). John Wiley & Sons. ISBN 9781118755921.
- "Constitution of the State of Mississippi" (current, 1890 with amendments). Mississippi Secretary of State (Education and Publications). Retrieved March 19, 2021.
- "Constitution of the State of Mississippi" (1890). Mississippi History Now. Archived from the original on October 9, 2016. Retrieved March 19, 2021.
- "Constitution of the State of Mississippi" (1868). Mississippi History Now. Archived from the original on April 21, 2016. Retrieved March 19, 2021.
- "Constitution of the State of Mississippi" (1832). Mississippi History Now. Archived from the original on October 9, 2016. Retrieved March 19, 2021.
- "Constitution of the State of Mississippi" (1817). Mississippi History Now. Archived from the original on October 9, 2016. Retrieved March 19, 2021.
- Crockett, James R. (2007). Hands in the Till: Embezzlement of Public Monies in Mississippi. University Press of Mississippi. ISBN 9781578069354.
- Krane, Dale; Shaffer, Stephen D. (1992). Mississippi Government and Politics: Modernizers Versus Traditionalists. University of Nebraska Press. ISBN 9780803277588.
- Mississippi Official and Statistical Register 2016–2020. Jackson: Mississippi Secretary of State. 2017. OCLC 1045214160.
- Rowland, Dunbar, ed. (1904). The Official and Statistical Register of the State of Mississippi. Jackson: Mississippi Department of Archives and History. OCLC 777030828.
- Winkle, John W. III (2014). The Mississippi State Constitution (second ed.). Oxford University Press. ISBN 9780199300631.
