= W. Q. Cole =

American government official (1856–1924)

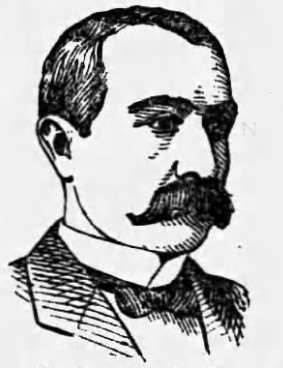
- c. 1900

20th State Auditor of Mississippi
- In office January 15, 1900 – January 18, 1904
- Governor: Andrew H. Longino
- Preceded by: W. D. Holder
- Succeeded by: Thomas Monroe Henry

Personal details
- Born: June 28, 1856 Holmes County, Mississippi, U.S.
- Died: July 25, 1924 (aged 68) Jackson, Mississippi, U.S.
- Party: Democratic
- Children: 4

William Qualls Cole (June 28, 1856 - July 25, 1924) was an American official. He served as State Auditor of Mississippi from 1900 to 1904 and as Mississippi's first insurance commissioner.

== Early life ==
William Qualls Cole was born on June 28, 1856, in Woodlawn Plantation, Holmes County, Mississippi. He was the son of William Ferguson Cole and Aurelia Qualls Watson. Cole attended the public schools of Lexington, Mississippi, and was tutored by his father in bookkeeping and accounting. Cole worked as a printer from 1870 to 1878.

== Career ==
Cole began working for the Illinois Central Railroad in 1878. He became its traveling auditor in 1883. He served on the City Council of Water Valley, Mississippi from 1894 to 1898. On January 1, 1898, Cole resigned from his traveling auditor position. In November 1899, Cole was elected State Auditor of Mississippi and served one term from 1900 to 1904. When Mississippi's Insurance Department was created on March 5, 1902, Cole became the state's first insurance commissioner ex officio. On November 3, 1903, Cole was re-elected Insurance Commissioner of Mississippi. He authored Mississippi's insurance law. He declined re-election for commissioner, and in 1908 was appointed president of the Lamar Life Insurance Company of Jackson. The company was described as "one of the foremost life insurance companies of the South" and "one of the state's jewels". He resigned from his position in 1920 due to failing health.

== Personal life and death ==
Cole was a member of the First Methodist Church of Jackson. He was a member of the Elks, the Knights of Pythias, and the Knights and Ladies of Honor. He married Alice May West on December 13, 1882. They had four children: William West, Alice Williams, George Welling, and Wilfred Qualls. Cole died at "half-past one o'clock" on the morning of July 25, 1924 at his residence in Jackson.
