= 17th Mississippi Infantry Regiment =

- Active: 1861–1865
- Disbanded: April 9, 1865
- Country: Confederate States
- Allegiance: Mississippi
- Branch: Confederate States Army
- Type: Infantry
- Size: Regiment
- Battles: American Civil War: First Battle of Bull Run; Battle of Ball's Bluff; Seven Days Battles; Battle of Antietam; Battle of Harpers Ferry; Battle of Fredericksburg; Battle of Chancellorsville; Battle of Gettysburg; Battle of Chickamauga; Siege of Knoxville; Battle of the Wilderness; Battle of Spotsylvania Court House; Battle of Cold Harbor; Siege of Petersburg

Commanders
- Notable commanders: Winfield S. Featherston; William Dunbar Holder; John Calvin Fiser

The 17th Mississippi Infantry Regiment was a unit of the Confederate States Army from Mississippi. As part of the Army of Northern Virginia, the 17th Mississippi fought in many of the bloodiest and most decisive battles of the Eastern theater of the American Civil War. After suffering heavy losses in battle, the remnants of the 17th Mississippi Infantry surrendered with Robert E. Lee's forces at Appomattox Court House on April 9, 1865.

== History ==
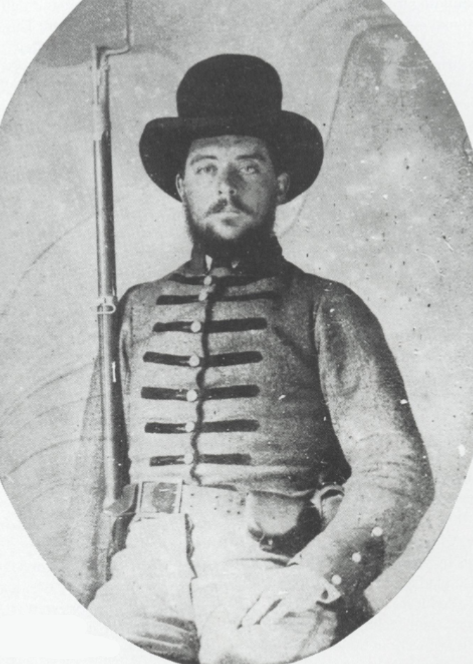
Private Josiah Archibald Lee, Company I, 17th Mississippi Infantry.

The volunteer companies that formed the 17th Mississippi were assembled at Corinth and mustered in to Confederate service in early June, 1861. Shortly thereafter, the 17th was sent to Virginia by rail, arriving at Manassas on June 17 with an original strength of 692 men. The Regiment fought at the First Battle of Bull Run, which was the first major clash of the war. The Regiment then distinguished itself during the Battle of Ball's Bluff in October, taking several Union prisoners.

In the spring of 1862, Colonel Winfield S. Featherston of the 17th was promoted to brigadier general, and the Regiment was assigned to the Mississippi brigade of general Richard Griffith. William Dunbar Holder was promoted to colonel and given command of the 17th, which took part in the Seven Days Battles near Richmond, Virginia. The Regiment fought at the Battle of Savage's Station, where general Griffith was killed, and at Malvern Hill, where the regiment took heavy casualties and Col. Holder was wounded. The Regiment lost 15 killed and 92 wounded during the Seven Days Battles.

During the Maryland Campaign, the 17th fought as part of general William Barksdale's Mississippi brigade at the Battle of Harpers Ferry, and took part in the Battle of Antietam, the bloodiest battle of the war. At Antietam, the 17th had 9 men killed and 77 wounded. The regiment then returned to Northern Virginia, joining the Confederate defensive lines at Fredericksburg. Union forces attempted to cross the Rappanhanock river there in December 1862, and were defeated with heavy losses at the Battle of Fredericksburg.

In the spring of 1863, the 17th fought at the Battle of Chancellorsville, before joining general Robert E. Lee's forces marching north towards Pennsylvania. At the second day of the Battle of Gettysburg, the regiment took part in general Barksdale's charge on the Union lines at The Peach Orchard. In the counterattack, Barksdale was killed and the regiment suffered heavy losses. Barksdale's Mississippi brigade suffered some of the highest Confederate casualty rates at Gettysburg, and the 17th took the highest losses of the brigade, with 40 killed and 160 wounded: a 43% casualty rate.

After the Gettysburg campaign, the 17th Mississippi was sent to Georgia, arriving while the Battle of Chickamauga was underway. After joining the Confederate forces, the regiment also took heavy losses in this battle, losing 12 dead and 75 wounded. The Regiment then moved north, taking part in various battles during the Knoxville campaign. During the Siege of Knoxville, the 17th took part in the ill-fated Confederate assault on Fort Sanders, which resulted in massive casualties. The combined losses of the 17th and the 13th Mississippi were 140 dead and wounded. The Union officer defending the fort, Captain Orlando Metcalfe Poe, reported the capture of the 17th Mississippi's regimental flag, and said "In spite of the gallantry and persistency of the attack, it was handsomely repulsed, with a loss to the enemy of almost the entire which led the assault....I know of no instance in history where a storming party was so nearly annihilated." Lt. Col. John C. Fiser, commanding the 17th, lost his arm in the battle and subsequently retired from military service.

During the winter the regiment was sent back to Virginia, and fought at the Battle of the Wilderness, the Battle of Spotsylvania Courthouse, and the Battle of Cold Harbor. The remnants of the 17th joined the Confederate defenders at Petersburg, Virginia, then retreated with Lee's Army to Appomattox Court House. Only 3 officers and 62 men of the regiment remained at the time of Lee's surrender.

== Commanders ==
Commanders of the 17th Mississippi Infantry:

- Col. Winfield S. Featherston, promoted to brigadier general, 1862.
- Col. William Dunbar Holder, resigned 1864.
- Col. John Calvin Fiser, retired due to disability, 1864
- Col. A.J. Pulliam
- Lt. Col. John McGuirk
- Lt. Col. Gwin R. Cherry

== Organization ==
Companies of the 17th Mississippi Infantry:

- Company A, "Buena Vista Rifles" of Chickasaw County.
- Company B, "Mississippi Rangers" of Perry County.
- Company C, "Quitman Greys"
- Company D, "Rough and Readies"
- Company E, "Burnsville Blues"
- Company F, "Sam Benton Relief Rifles" of Marshall County.
- Company G, "Confederate Guards"
- Company H, "Panola Vindicators"
- Company I, "Pettus Rifles"
- Company K, "Magnolia Guards" of Calhoun County.

== See also ==
- List of Mississippi Civil War Confederate units
