= Charlotte Capers =

American historian, archivist and author (1913–1996)

- Born: June 28, 1913; Columbia, Tennessee, U.S.
- Died: December 23, 1996 (aged 83); Jackson, Mississippi, U.S.
- Occupations: Archivist, historian, author
- Relatives: William Theodotus Capers (uncle); Ellison Capers (grandfather); William Capers (great-grandfather)

Charlotte Capers (June 28, 1913 − December 23, 1996) was an American historian, archivist, and author. She was director of the Mississippi Department of Archives and History (MDAH) from 1955 to 1969, and was the first woman to become the head of a state agency in Mississippi. Her tenure in various staff positions at MDAH spanned 45 years (1938–1983).

== Biography ==
Charlotte Capers was born on June 28, 1913, in Columbia, Tennessee, to Walter Branham Capers and Louise Woldridge Capers. His paternal grandfather was Confederate Army major and bishop Ellison Capers, who is himself the son of bishop William Capers.

With the goal of becoming a journalist, Capers attended the University of Colorado and Millsaps College, receiving a BA degree in English from the University of Mississippi in 1934.

In 1938, Capers joined the staff of MDAH as a stenographer. In 1943, when MDAH Director, William D. McCain was called to active duty in WWII, Capers was promoted from her position as research and editorial assistant to Acting Director. She served in that position until McCain returned from military service in 1945. In 1955, Capers was elected MDAH Director by the Board of Trustees. Accomplishments during her tenure as Director included:

- Planned and oversaw restoration of the Old Mississippi State Capitol.
- The State Historical Museum was organized and housed in the Old State Capitol.
- Plans were finalized and funding was secured for construction of a new Archives and History Building.

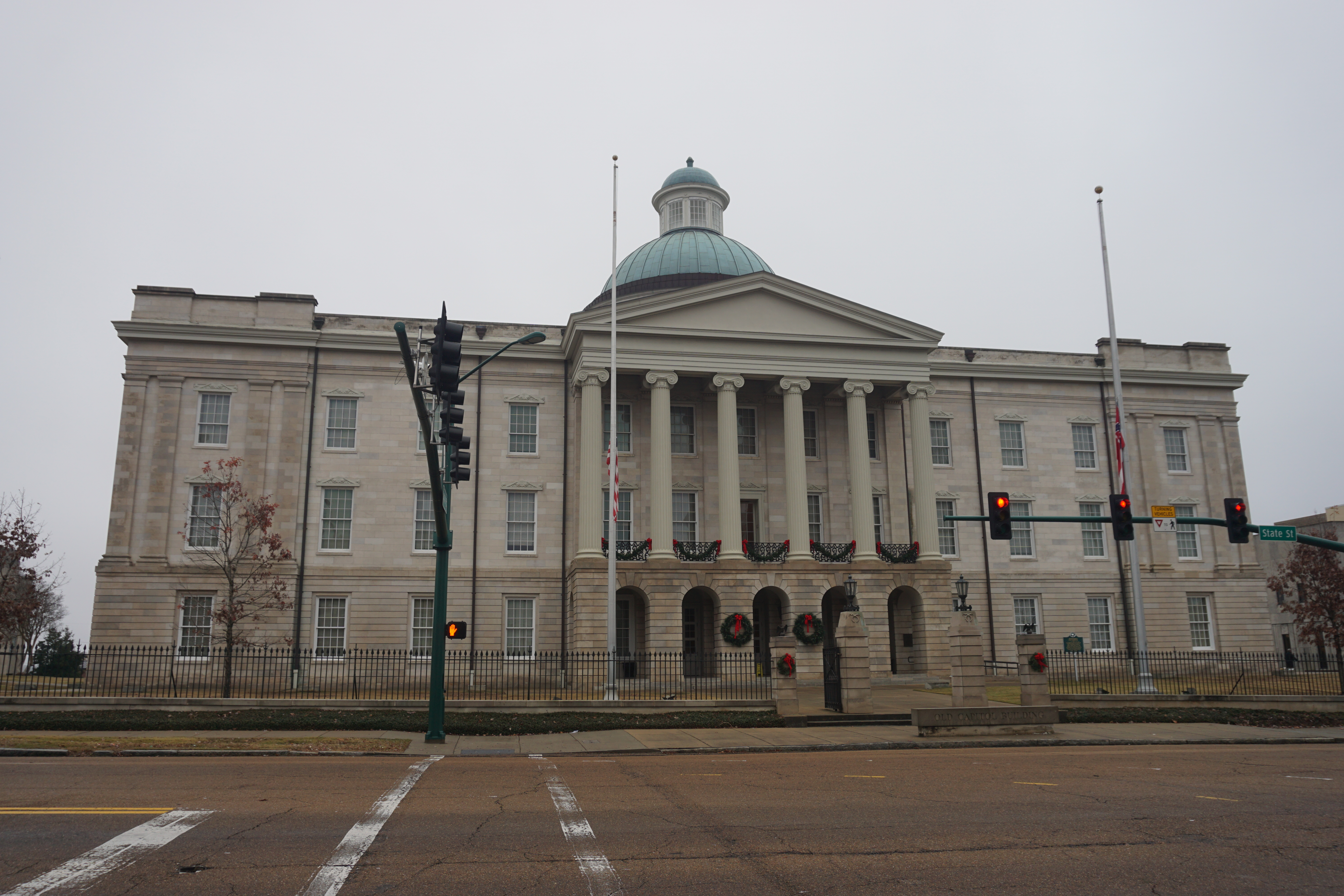
The Old Mississippi State Capitol in 2018

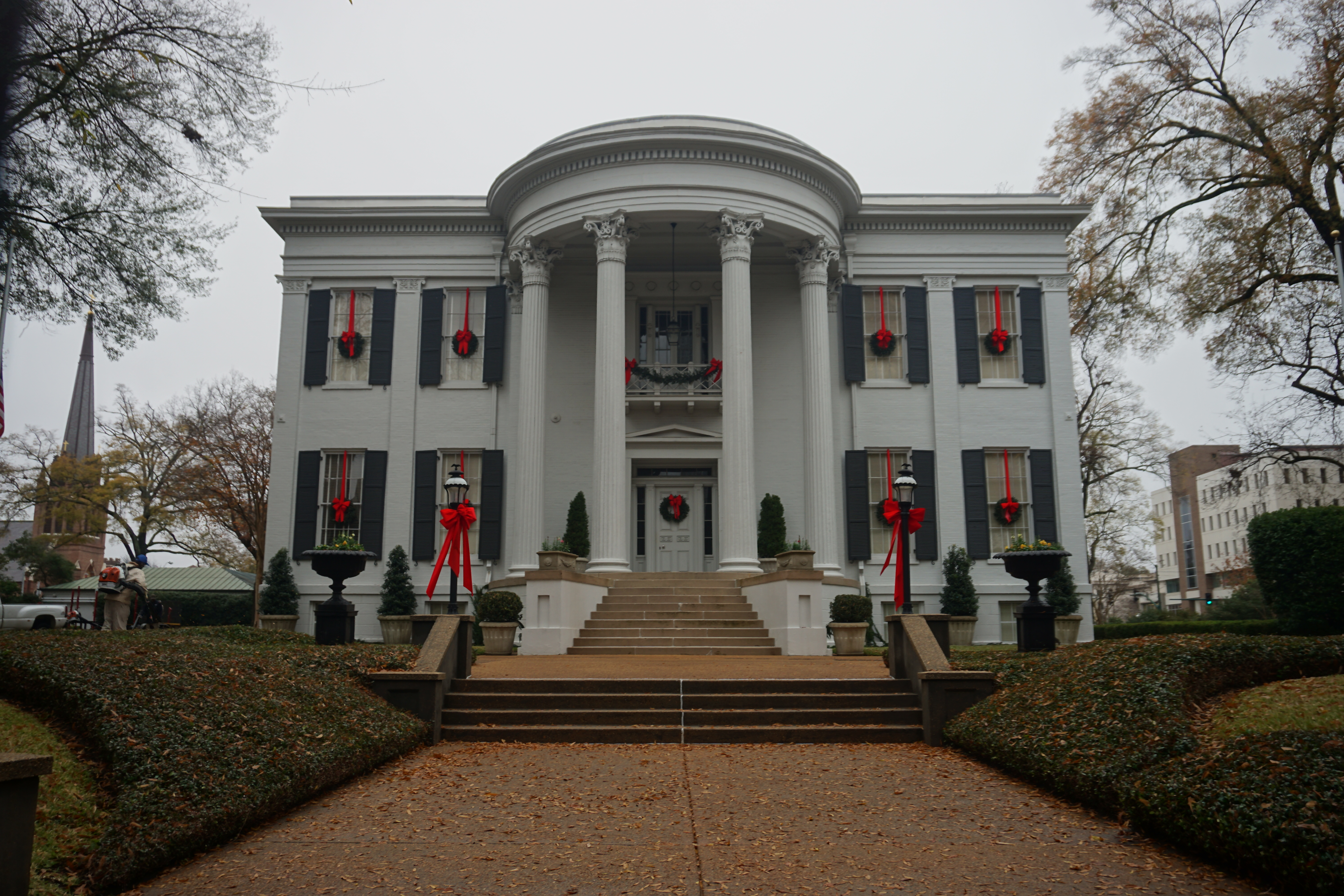
The Mississippi Governor's Mansion in 2018

In 1969, Capers stepped down as MDAH Director and moved into a subordinate position as director of information and education at MDAH. In 1972, she was appointed principal executive for restoration of the Governor's Mansion. Charlotte Capers retired from MDAH on April 1, 1983.

Charlotte Capers died December 23, 1996, aged 83, in Jackson, Mississippi, and was interred at Lakewood Memorial Park in Jackson, Mississippi. In 1983, the Mississippi Legislature authorized MDAH Board of Trustees to rename the Archives and History Building as the Charlotte Capers Building in honor of her 45 years of dedicated service to MDAH.

=== Journalism credits ===
- Editor-in-chief (1956–69) for the Journal of Mississippi History
- Author of The Capers Papers – a collection of humorous essays originally published in Jackson, Mississippi newspapers
- Authored 99 book reviews for The New York Times Book Review
