= John Calvin Fiser =

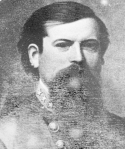
- Colonel John Calvin Fiser, CSA photo taken in 1864 or 1865
- Born: May 4, 1838; Dyersburg, Tennessee, US
- Died: June 1876 (aged 37–38); Memphis, Tennessee, US
- Military career
- Allegiance: Confederate States of America
- Branch: Confederate States Army
- Service years: 1861–1865
- Rank: Colonel; Acting Brigadier General
- Commands: 17th Mississippi Infantry
- Conflicts: American Civil War

John Calvin Fiser (May 4, 1838 – June 4, 14, or 15, 1876) was an American merchant and soldier. He served as an officer in the Confederate Army during the American Civil War, fighting in both the Eastern as well as the Western theaters. Fiser was seriously wounded five times in the conflict, losing an arm in 1863's Battle of Fort Sanders, and he was appointed a general officer late in the war; however, the appointment was never confirmed by the Confederate Senate. Afterward he returned to his business interests and was active in Confederate veterans organizations.

== Early life and career ==
John Fiser was born in 1838 in the city of Dyersburg located in Dyer County, Tennessee. His father was Matthew Day Fiser (died 1852) and his mother's identity (died 1849) is not known. In 1848 Fiser's family moved to Batesville in Panola County, Mississippi. After his father died Fiser was raised by his uncle, John B. Fiser, a politician and merchant also living in Panola County. In 1853 he began working in Lafayette County, clerking in a country store near the shore of the Tallahatchie River. In 1855 Fiser moved to Memphis, Tennessee, and found work as a cotton merchant and later in the mercantile business.

== Civil War service ==
When the American Civil War began in 1861 Fiser returned to Mississippi to follow the Confederate cause. On May 27 he was elected a first lieutenant in the 17th Mississippi Infantry, assigned to Company H (styled the "Panola Vindicators") in the regiment he had helped create in Panola County. On June 4 he was made the regiment's adjutant, and he participated with the 17th Mississippi in the First Battle of Bull Run on July 21. That autumn he fought with distinction during the Battle of Ball's Bluff, where he was praised for his "most important and effective service."

On October 12, 1861, Fiser was appointed the assistant adjutant general of his regiment, and during the reorganization of the Army of Northern Virginia early the following year he was elected lieutenant colonel of the 17th Mississippi as of April 26, 1862. He fought during the Peninsula Campaign, replacing the regiment's colonel when that officer became a casualty in the Battle of Malvern Hill. The 17th's attack that day has been described as:

At Malvern Hill, 1 July 1862, about six in the evening, they made a desperate charge upon the Federal line, under a terrible fire of shell, grape, canister and Minié balls, but without success. Colonel Holder was wounded and Lieutenant-Colonel Fiser took command.

Fiser continued to command the regiment during the Maryland Campaign in the fall of 1862, leading it in the Battle of Antietam on September 17. Later that year he was appointed adjutant of his brigade. He fought during the Fredericksburg Campaign that winter, part of Brig. Gen. William Barksdale's brigade that defended the Rappahannock River crossing at the town on December 11. Fiser was wounded during the main battle two days later. He then fought during the 1863 Gettysburg campaign, and was wounded during the Battle of Gettysburg that July. Fiser was first shot in the cheek and then hit in the same leg twice.

=== Fort Sanders ===
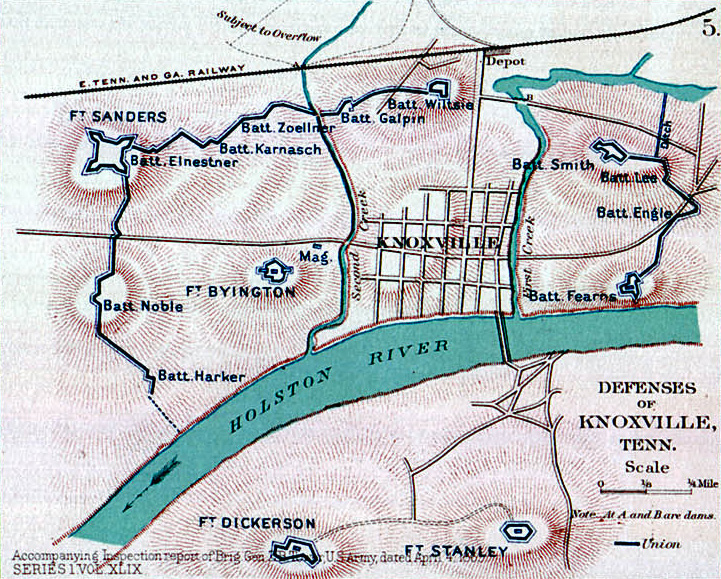
Defenses of Knoxville; Fiser lost an arm in an attack on them in November 1863.

In the fall of 1863 Fiser and his regiment were sent west with Lt. Gen. James Longstreet's First Corps units. He participated in the Battle of Chickamauga and then fought during the Knoxville Campaign. On November 29 Fiser was hit in his right arm as he reached the top of the Union defensive position during the Battle of Fort Sanders, a wound requiring the amputation of the limb. An account of his actions in the attack follows:

Fiser has a hatchet buckled onto his sword belt, and he vowed to cut down the tall flagstaff on top of the enemy fort. He climbed to the top of the parapet during the heat of battle, and was making for the flagstaff when a ball shattered his arm, and rolling him back into the ditch.

While recovering from losing his arm, Fiser was assigned to recruiting duties. On February 26, 1864, he was promoted to the rank of colonel, but the wound was slow to heal and he resigned his commission on June 12 and returned home. That winter Maj. Gen. Lafayette McLaws asked for Fiser for service in South Carolina, and he rejoined the Confederate Army. In 1865 Fiser was given command of a brigade of reservists from Georgia, part of the scattered forces that opposed the Union soldiers of Maj. Gen. William T. Sherman during the Carolinas campaign. On April 9 his small 800-man brigade was merged with that of Col. George P. Harrison, his senior, reducing Fiser to regimental command. Also in 1865 Fiser was appointed a brigadier general, however the Confederate Senate never confirmed his commission as such.

== Postbellum ==
When the Civil War ended in 1865 he returned to Memphis, Tennessee, where he resumed his pre-war business affairs. In 1866 he married Hayes Dunn, with whom he had three daughters, and shortly thereafter changed the spelling of his name to Fizer, reasoning that was the way it had sounded all his life. Three streets in Memphis were later named after him, all using this spelling. He also became a partner in a large and successful cotton brokerage firms and actively participated in local Democratic politics.

In 1871 Fiser was elected president of the Confederate Historical and Relief Association based in Memphis, and at the time of his death he was serving as president of the Office Security Building and Loan Association. Fiser died of dysentery in 1876, and his remains were buried in the Chapel Hill section of the Elmwood Cemetery located in Memphis.

== See also ==
- List of American Civil War generals (Acting Confederate)
