= Mississippi Civil Rights Museum =

Museum in Jackson, Mississippi

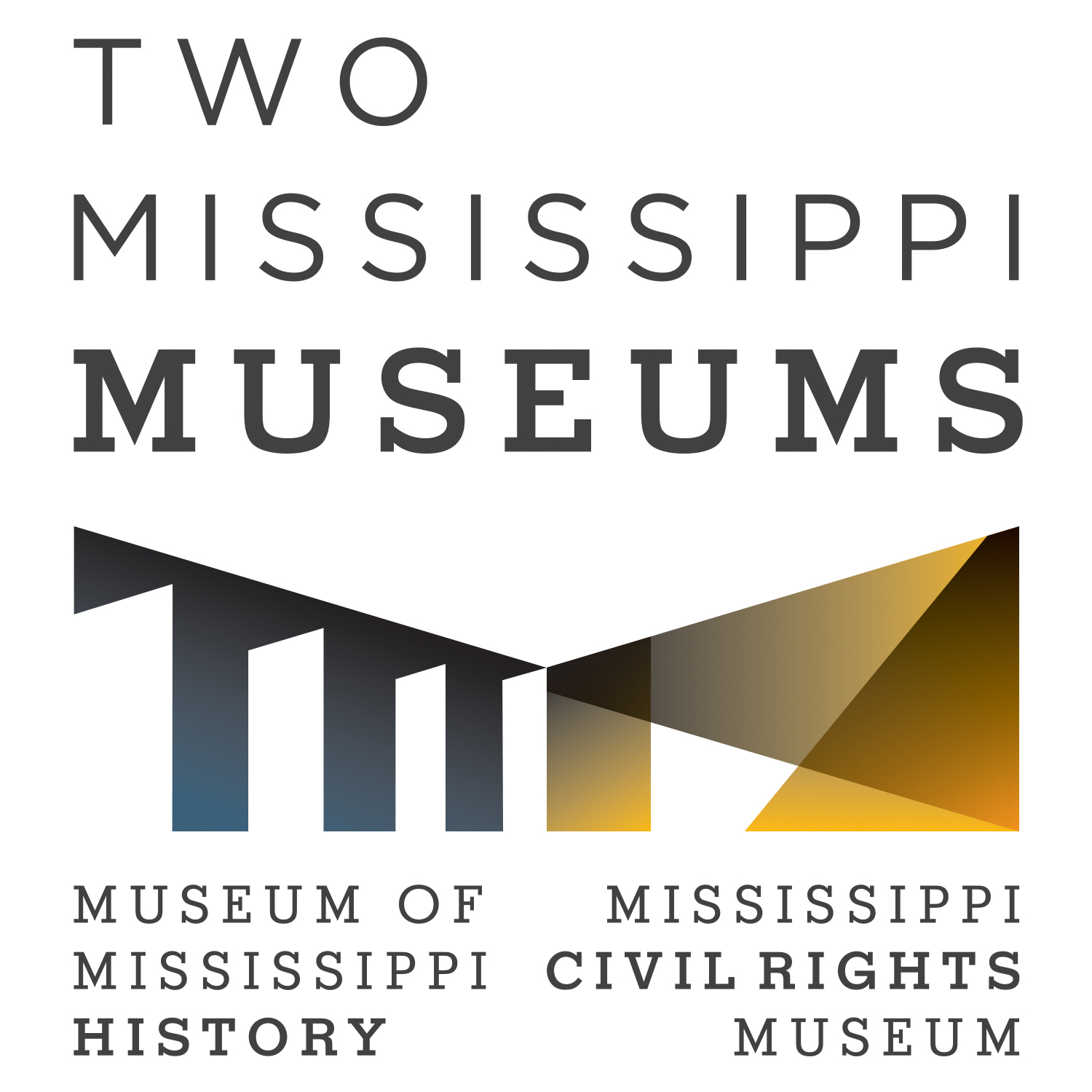

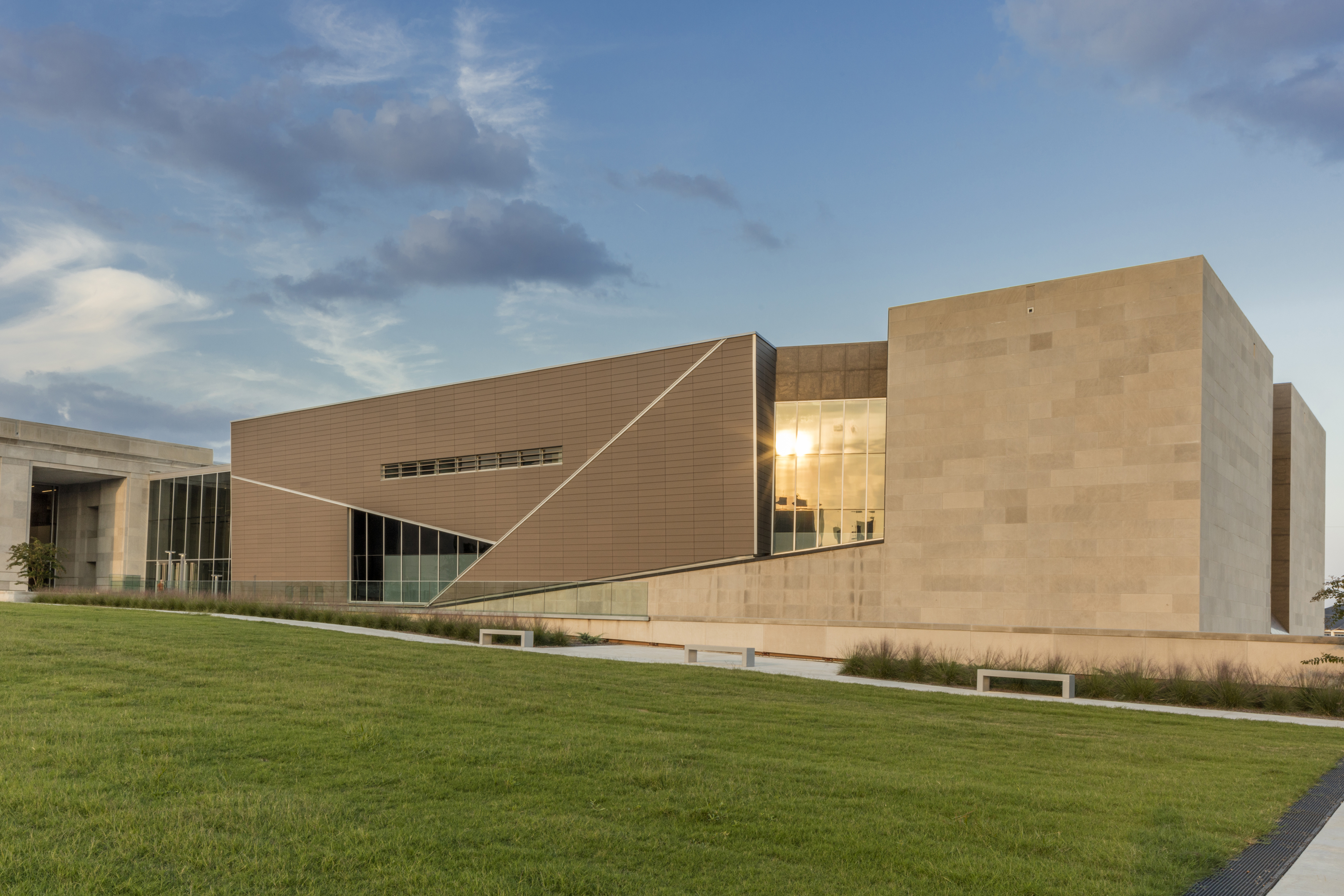
- Mississippi Civil Rights Museum in 2017

- Location within Mississippi
- Established: 2011 (funding); December 9, 2017 (opening)
- Location: Jackson, Mississippi
- Coordinates: 32.301807°N 90.17809°W
- Type: Public
- Visitors: 500,000+
- Director: Michael Morris
- Website: mcrm.mdah.ms.gov

The Mississippi Civil Rights Museum is a museum in Jackson, Mississippi, United States. Its mission is to document, exhibit the history of, and educate the public about the American Civil Rights Movement in the U.S. state of Mississippi between 1945 and 1970. The museum secured $20 million in funding from the Mississippi Legislature in April 2011 after Governor Haley Barbour testified in favor of its funding. Ground was broken in 2013, and the museum opened on December 9, 2017. The museum is administered by the Mississippi Department of Archives and History.

According to Mississippi State Senator John Horhn, it is the first state-sponsored civil rights museum in the United States.

== Founding the museum ==
=== Early efforts ===
The Mississippi State Historical Museum (located in the Old Mississippi State Capitol) opened a civil rights exhibit in the mid-1980s. But by 2001, with only two memorials to the civil rights movement in Mississippi, civil rights activists, historians, and tourism officials began planning for a civil rights museum. (Note: The two memorials were: An eternal flame on the grave of James Cheney in Okatibbee Cemetery in Meridian, and a statue of Medgar Evers in Jackson.) (Note: Tourism officials were involved due to a boom in "heritage tourism," in which individuals wished to visit a series of sites ("trails") that documented historic events. Civil rights movement "heritage tourism" had become especially important in the Deep South.) One of the museum's key promoters was Hattiesburg native Iola Williams. In 2002, The Clarion-Ledger reported that historic Brownlee Gymnasium on the campus of Tougaloo College (a historically black college north of Jackson) was under consideration as the site of the museum. In 2003, the Associated Press reported that the abandoned former Council of Federated Organizations (COFO) building near Jackson State University might also be used.

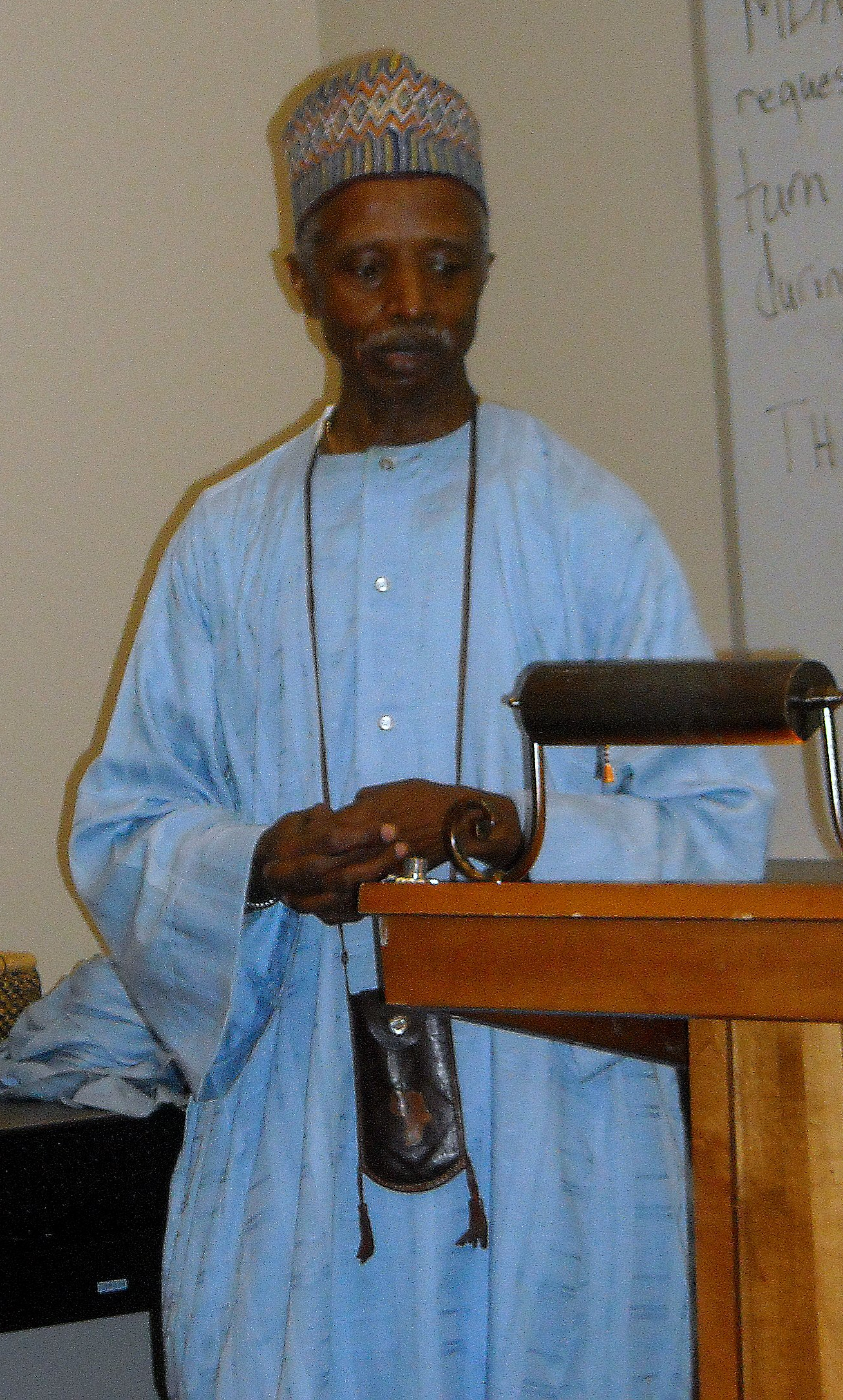
Mississippi state senator Hillman Frazier, whose legislative efforts proved critical to the museum's success.

Beginning in 2000, state Senator John Horhn (a Democrat) began introducing legislation to fund a state civil rights museum. The bill located the museum at Tougaloo College, but it died each year he introduced it. In 2004, Democratic state Representative Erik R. Fleming also filed legislation to create a state civil rights museum. By July, the William Winter Institute for Racial Reconciliation at the University of Mississippi (a highly influential civil rights institute within the state, named for the former governor) was also backing the project. The bill failed, but Horhn and Fleming reintroduced it in 2005. Although the state House approved $200,000 in planning funds (later reduced to $100,000), the bill did not pass the state Senate. Another attempt in 2006 also failed. Horhn reintroduced his bill later in the session, this time leaving the choice of site up to a commission and seeking only $500,000 for a study committee. State Representative John Reeves (a Republican, supported the measure in the House, although his measure added a black sports hall of fame to the museum. But this second effort failed as well, despite broad support from legislators and citizens.

=== Study commissions ===
A third and successful effort was made late in the session by state Senator Hillman Frazier. This measure merely established a legislative study commission, rather than an executive branch committee, and required the legislative committee to issue a report by December 31, 2006. The legislative study ran into problems, however. African Americans in Mississippi, accustomed to exclusion from museum efforts, were wary of backing the proposal for fear of created a white-washed version of the state's difficult civil rights struggle.

In November 2006, Mississippi Governor Haley Barbour proposed creating a $500,000 state Department of Archives and History commission to develop plans for the civil rights museum. On December 19, the legislative study commission issued its report. It said a $50 million museum should be built in Jackson, and be linked to a "civil rights trail" of historically significant civil rights sites throughout the state. The joint committee said the museum should be about 112,500 square feet (10,450 m^{2}) in size, supported by a private foundation, and that $500,000 should be appropriated to begin planning. Controversy quickly erupted over where the museum should be located.

A month later, on January 16, 2007, Governor Barbour declared in his "State of the State" address that the museum was "overdue, and it needs doing", Barbour's support for the museum gave many Republicans in the state legislature the political support they needed to overcome conservative voters' opposition and back the bill. Although there was widespread support for the governor's $500,000 funding proposal, state legislators battled over whether the building should be located in Jackson or the Mississippi Delta section of the state. The state House voted to pass a bill to float $48 million in bonds to build a museum in Jackson, and state officials publicly suggested that state take over the United States District Court for the Southern District of Mississippi building once a new courthouse was constructed. But the House bill died in the state Senate. The Senate supported a bill to appropriate only the $500,000 in planning funds requested by the governor. The Senate bill passed both houses of the state legislature in March 2007 and was signed into law by the governor.

=== Site selection ===
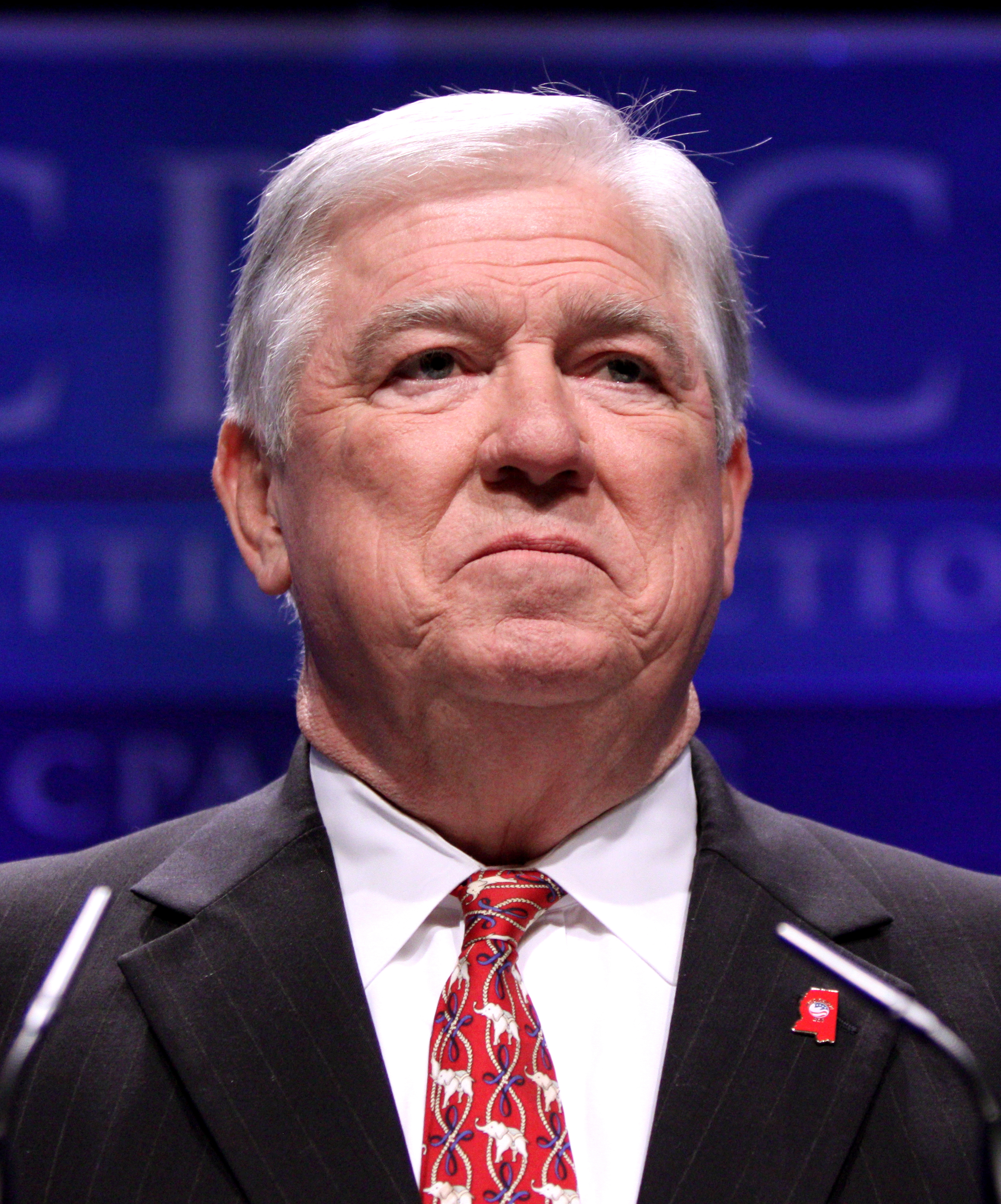
Gov. Haley Barbour, who pushed for a site selection commission in 2007.

The 2007 legislation turned the selection of a site over to a 39-member commission. State Senator Hillman Frazier and former state Supreme Court of Mississippi Justice Reuben Anderson co-chaired the commission. Sources differ as to whether 10 or 20 sites were proposed. Among the sites under consideration were:

- Grenada, where a mob attempted to prevent school integration in 1966;
- Hattiesburg, a key site in the 1964 Freedom Summer voter registration project;
- Jackson State University in Jackson;
- Natchez, site of the notorious Forks in the Road slave market as well as the home church of Hiram Rhodes Revels (the first African American to serve in the United States Congress, serving in the Senate from February 23, 1870, until March 3, 1871)
- Philadelphia, where the Reverend Martin Luther King Jr. led two civil rights marches; and
- Tougaloo College in Jackson.

The committee said it would narrows the list of candidates down to four or five, and the conduct site visits. LaPaglia and Associates, a consulting firm, assisted the committee in its work (although it was paid from private donations and not state funds). When the committee announced its short-list, three of the five sites were in Jackson (including one on Farish Street).

Politically, there seemed little chance of winning funding for any museum in the 2008 legislative session. Nonetheless, backers of the museum submitted legislation authorizing $50 million in bonds to build the facility.

The consultant to the governor's committee announced on February 13, 2008, that it was recommending that the committee choose a 9-acre (3.6 ha) on the Tougaloo College campus as the site for the future museum. Vernon Dahmer Park in Hattiesburg was the consultant's second choice, followed by three sites in downtown Jackson (one near the Old State Capital Museum, one near Smith-Wills baseball stadium, and another on Farish Street). The choice of a site was not yet final, as the governor's committee still had to vote to accept the consultant's recommendation. But backers of the museum were already discussing the museum's charter publicly, saying it would be limited to highlighting only Mississippi's civil rights struggle. Supporters also said that the museum would open in two or three years, once the state legislature approved public funding for the public-private partnership designed to finance its construction.

Disagreement over the consultant's recommendation was strong. State Senator David Lee Jordan said he would submit legislation to have the museum built in Greenwood (near where 14-year-old Emmett Till was tortured and murdered on August 28, 1955, for flirting with a white woman, an event that sparked the modern civil rights movement). Others advocated for sites in downtown Jackson. Supporters of other sites noted that, of the 25 locations initially considered by LaPaglia & Associates, the top site was one near Smith-Wills Stadium in Jackson, and that Tougaloo College was tenth on the list. When the short-list of five candidate locations was released in early February, they said, Tougaloo had somehow risen to the top. The commission, these individuals said, was biased because it had too many people with ties to Tougaloo College as members. The consulting firm said Tougaloo rated highest because of the size of the property and the ability to expand even more in the future; access to I-55; the ability to create large amounts of public parking; and other issues. The controversy intensified with Tougaloo College President Beverly Hogan, a member of the governor's commission, began lobbying other members of the commission to ratify the consultant's recommendation. Hogan forcefully denied that there was anything improper about such contact. Tom Hood, director of the Mississippi Ethics Commission, said there was no obvious conflict of interest for Hogan to either sit on the committee or to lobby fellow committee members.

On March 10, the governor's commission voted 22-to-9 to accept the consultant's recommendation. By now, the Associated Press was reporting, the museum would cost $73 million, have 73,650 square feet (6,842 m^{2}) of space, and include exhibits, gift shop, meeting rooms, a memorial garden, and a theater. Ten million dollars of the cost would go toward an endowment for the museum. It was expected to draw 125,000 visitors its first year. Days later, Hogan offered the state a 99-year lease to 9-acre (3.6 ha) site in exchange for $50,000 a year in scholarship money. Backers of the project said $300,000 in private donations had already been raised for the museum, and that they expected Governor Barbour to name the 12-to-15 person museum board of directors shortly. The museum was expected to take three to four years to finish, with the biggest issue being the mission (how geographically narrow its focus might be, and how broad the time period) and how to build the collection.

=== Inaction ===
Despite the site selection, almost no action was taken on the museum project for three years.

By late December 2008, Mississippi newspapers were calling the project "stalled". Among the reasons for inaction were the severe late-2000s recession, lack of direction from the governor's office, the governor's refusal to spend the $500,000 in state appropriations for museum planning, and the death of consultant Pete LaPaglia. Governor Barbour's press spokesperson defended the governor's seeming lack of movement, saying that the governor had asked committee members for nominations for the museum board.

By August 2009, there was little additional movement. No additional funds had been forthcoming from the legislature, there was still no board of directors named, and no timetable for fund-raising or construction had been set. Justice Anderson blamed the poor economy for the lack of movement, and the governor's office said it had held several meetings in the first eight months of the year about the museum project. State Senator Horhn, however, suggested that the Tougaloo College site was too controversial to permit the project to go forward. He advocated that the site selection be reconsidered, and Justice Anderson said he believed that a museum board of directors would have the power to make that reconsideration.

By late 2010, the project appeared dead. After paying for the consulting work, only $108,000 of the state's money was left. The Associated Press ran a major story in November 2010 criticizing the lack of movement. Governor Barbour had pressed ahead not with the museum but rather with a $2.1 million "Mississippi Civil Rights Trail" of historic markers. The article quoted museum backers who felt that Barbour had reneged on his promise to build a museum in favor of a cheaper, less visible historic trail. Reacting to the Associated Press article, the editor of The Commercial Appeal in Memphis, Tennessee (location of the National Civil Rights Museum) noted, "Mississippi's leadership, however, has no excuse for the fact that there is no plan in place, no artifact collection and no governance for the project."

=== Creation of the museum ===
The Mississippi Civil Rights Museum finally won funding and approval from the state in 2011.

Governor Barbour announced in late 2010 that he would run for president of the United States. In an interview with The Weekly Standard neoconservative newsmagazine, Barbour appeared to minimize the oppressiveness of racial intolerance in Mississippi when he characterized the White Citizens' Council in his hometown of Yazoo City was merely "an organization of town leaders" that kept more radical anti-integrationist elements (like the Ku Klux Klan) at bay. Barbour was widely criticized nationally for these remarks.

In what many political observers felt was an attempt to disassociate himself from Mississippi's racially intolerant past as well as to dampen the criticism over his remarks, Governor Barbour declared in his 2011 "State of the State" speech that the Mississippi Civil Rights Museum must be built: "This is the year to get this museum going. This is the 50th anniversary of the Freedom Riders and the 150th anniversary of the start of the Civil War." He won a standing ovation from the legislature. Barbour did not address how to fund the museum (whether with public dollars or a public-private fund). However, former governor William Winter and former Justice Reuben Anderson had been pushing to have the museum built next to the planned Museum of Mississippi History (which was to be constructed just north of William Winter Archives and History Building), and Governor Barbour endorsed this approach in his speech. After the speech, state officials said they had more than 100,000 feet (30,000 m) of 16 mm film footage, the records of the defunct Mississippi State Sovereignty Commission (a state agency whose mission was to strategize ways to oppose racial integration), manuscript collections of civil rights activists from the 1940s and 1950s, and a large collection of newspapers to use as the core of a museum collection.

In the state House, museum backers introduced legislation to authorize a Mississippi Civil Rights Museum. Debates over the location was not settled by Barbour's speech, however. The Mississippi Legislative Black Caucus held public hearings to discuss possible locations, with backers of the Greenwood site making the strongest effort. Former members of the governor's committee said that it was unclear if the Tougaloo College site was a valid one any longer. But the House legislation to fully fund the $73 million museum died in mid-February. Museum backers in the state House then filed another bill, which would issue state bonds to fund not only the civil rights museum but also the Mississippi history museum and a parking garage for both facilities. Similar bond legislation was filed in the state Senate, although it provided only $25 million and only funded the civil rights museum. Both bills specified Jackson as the location, and both bills called for a new museum commission (with members drawn from the state's historically black colleges and universities, the director of the state archives, the secretary of the state tourism department, the lieutenant governor, the speaker of the House, and other bodies) to be appointed by a specific date. After unsuccessful attempts to amend the bill to locate the museum in Greenwood, to build it at Tougaloo College, to build it on Farish Street, and to build a satellite museum in Greenwood, the state House passed the bill, 104-to-16. The funding level was dropped to $55 million ($30 million for the civil rights museum, $18 million for the history museum, and $7 million for the parking garage), which museum backers said would lead to the facility's completion in 2018. Governor Barbour said he supported the House bill, which saved $25 million by building the two museums simultaneously.

On February 23, the state Senate passed its version of the museum bill, 36-to-10. The Senate bill also funded the museum at the $30 million level, but required that half the funding come from private sources and that all private donations be in-hand before the state's funding kicked in. The funding structure reflected state senators' worries that the total cost of the civil rights and history museum, after acquiring collections and building exhibits, could top $100 million. The Senate defeated an attempt to specify the location of the museum in Jackson. Governor Barbour then shifted his position, and said he favored the public-private funding scheme adopted by the Senate. The Senate took up the House bill, and amended it to include the public-private funding scheme.

The Mississippi state constitution bars the legislature from passing appropriations bills in the last five days of a legislative session. State lawmakers had missed this deadline, preventing them from appropriating money to fund the museum project. The House and Senate established a conference committee to work out their differences. The two sides agreed to fund the museum through a bond sale rather than direct appropriation of money (which was a means around the constitutional funding deadline bar), but could not agree on whether private funds should be required or optional.

Governor Barbour then threatened to call the legislature into special session if the civil rights museum was not funded. Barbour suggested it would be easier for the two sides to start fresh in a special session rather than continue to work on a compromise bond bill in the last days of the legislative session. He called for the state to pay the cost of constructing the museum, but for a 50-50 public-private fund-raising scheme for acquiring collections and building exhibits.

With the threat of a special session, the state House and Senate quickly compromised. The final bill, passed on April 4, 2011, provided for the sale of $20 million in state bonds to fund the construction of the Mississippi Civil Rights Museum, with a 50-50 public-private funding scheme for acquiring the collection. Private funds were not required to be collected before public funds became available; rather, public money was a matching fund. The state House approved the bill 94-to-25, while the state Senate approved it 42-to-10. Governor Barbour heavily lobbied state senators to pass the measure. Former governor William Winter and former Justice Reuben Anderson also heavily lobbied the legislature. The parking garage was not funded. Governor Barbour signed the legislation into law the final week of April.

== Funding, design, and planning ==
The Mississippi State Bond Commission unanimously approved the sale of $40 million in tax-exempt bonds for the Museum of Mississippi History and the Mississippi Civil Rights Museum on September 19, 2011. By December 2011, The Clarion-Ledger was reporting that the civil rights museum commission had selected a building site at 200 North Street in downtown Jackson, just north of the Old State Capital.

On December 15, 2011, museum organizers announced that African American architect Philip Freelon would design the building, in association with architect Jeffrey Barnes of Dale Partners Architects of Jackson. The Mississippi Civil Rights Museum Advisory Commission had also been established, and the public was invited to participate in a series of meetings to determine the museum's scope and the type of collections it should acquire. Architectural drawings for the building's interior as well as a number of conceptual proposals for the exterior were developed by April 2012, and taken around the state to seek citizen input. Interim Project Manager Angela Stewart told the press, "We are in the schematic design phase of the museum where simultaneously architects are working on a design for the building. Also our exhibit designers are working on exhibits for the building." Feedback at that time favored a building with a "distinctive form" with an interior that was dignified. Members of the public expressed the concern that the exhibits not whitewash the truth about the civil rights movement in Mississippi. Forums were also held at the same time to solicit feedback on what the museum should exhibit, collect artifacts, and record oral histories. Museum Division Director Lucy Allen said that, unlike other civil rights museums, the Mississippi Civil Rights Museum would show not only how the civil rights movement impacted Mississippi but also the nation.

It was estimated in April 2012 that the exterior of the civil rights museum will be finished by 2017. Total construction costs of $70 million were estimated at that time. An exhibit of some artifacts were put on display at the Old Capitol Museum in late April.

In mid-July 2012, the state Department of Archives and History revealed a new museum design that would connect the Mississippi Civil Rights Museum to the Museum of Mississippi History, with a shared lobby between them. To accommodate the design revision, the site of the museum was shifted to an empty lot slightly north of the archives building, on a parcel bounded by North Street, Mississippi Street, and North Jefferson Street. The civil rights museum would have seven galleries, each dedicated to a single theme; 40-foot (12 m) high sculpture in a central atrium; a large theater; and a small theater shaped like a jail cell. Officials said the museum is likely to commission a documentary film about the murder of Emmett Till for screening in the large theater, and shorter film about the Freedom Riders for the smaller theater. Groundbreaking was expected in the summer of 2013. State officials also said that they expected to issue an RFP for primary contractors soon. They also appealed to the public for an additional $12,000 in donations to enable them to reach their public fund-raising goal, and for additional artifacts and collections to be donated to the museum.

The museum hired Jacqueline K. Dace as its director in November 2012. Dace, who formally began work on December 1, is a former curator of African American collections at the Missouri History Museum and most recently was collections manager at the DuSable Museum of African-American History. In 2017, the Mississippi Department of Archives and History brought in Pam Junior as the new museum Director. Junior came from the Smith Robertson Museum and Cultural Center in Jackson, where she had been manager since 1999. Junior is a member of the board of directors for the Mississippi Delta National Heritage Area and Mississippi Book Festival and a co-founder of the Mississippi Black Theater Festival

The museum hired Hilferty & Associates to design exhibits for the museum, which were fabricated by Exhibit Concepts. Monadnock Media designed the audio portions of the exhibits. Dr. John Fleming, historian of the African American experience, former director for the National Afro-American Museum and Cultural Center and director of the National Underground Railroad Freedom Center and the Cincinnati Museum Center at Union Terminal, has also been hired as a special consultant for exhibit design.

== Opening ==
The Mississippi Civil Rights Museum opened with a dedication ceremony on December 9, 2017. It is the first museum about the U.S. civil rights movement to be sponsored by a U.S. state.

The Mississippi Civil Rights Museum is adjacent to the new Museum of Mississippi History. The buildings share a common entrance and lobby. The civil rights museum has several sections. Visitors first move through an exhibit on the slave trade, then through a section on how the Emancipation Proclamation and Reconstruction created African American communities that began to thrive. Visitors then enter a large room dominated by a tree. The tree represents lynching, and on the leaves are images of lynchings and the types of discrimination permitted and encouraged by Jim Crow laws. The names of more than 600 African Americans lynched in Mississippi are etched onto five large memorial stones. These first three sections are cramped, a physical environment intended to give the patron a sense of the constraint of slavery. The remaining segments of the museum are more spacious, and focus on a 30-year period during which Mississippi was in the forefront of the civil rights struggle. Included in these sections are an exhibit on individuals murdered for their civil rights activism.

The Mississippi Civil Rights Museum drew praise from civil rights activists who attended the dedication as "an honest depiction of Mississippi's past". The media noted that the Museum of Mississippi History, which covers the state's history from the Paleozoic to the present, offers little coverage of the civil rights era, leaving that to the Mississippi Civil Rights Museum. Holland Cotter, reviewing the museum for The New York Times, wrote that the museum "rivets attention." Concentrating on a relatively narrow time frame and location, he said, makes the "museum's energy feel combustive. So does the fact that, to a startling degree, and despite being a state-sponsored institution, the museum refuses to sugarcoat history." He singled out the exhibits for special praise, calling them "magnetic".

=== Dedication controversy ===
Mississippi Governor Phil Bryant, a Republican, invited President Donald Trump to attend the Mississippi Civil Rights Museum's dedication. Trump's acceptance of the invitation created a controversy, as many African Americans, civil rights leaders, and others said Trump's stand on racial issues was at odds with the museum's intent. The National Association for the Advancement of Colored People asked Trump not to attend. Many African American politicians boycotted the dedication, including, U.S. Representative John Lewis (himself a civil rights activist), U.S. Rep. Bennie Thompson (whose district includes Jackson), and Jackson Mayor Chokwe Antar Lumumba.

Trump flew to Mississippi on December 9, but did not attend the public dedication ceremony. Instead, he received a private, 30-minute tour of both museums and then delivered a 10-minute speech to a small, select group of individuals. In his remarks, Trump singled out civil rights activist Medgar Evers, who was murdered in Jackson in 1963. Trump acknowledged the presence in the audience of Evers' widow, Myrlie Evers-Williams, who subsequently received a standing ovation.

As Trump toured the museums, protests took place outside. Some held signs saying "Make America Civil Again" and "Lock Him Up". Some protesters chanted "No Trump, no hate, no KKK in the USA", while others stood by mute, their mouths covered by stickers featuring the Confederate battle flag.

== About the museum ==
=== Layout ===
The Mississippi Civil Rights Museum consists of a lobby and eight galleries. The layout is circular, with galleries surrounding the central rotunda. The design concept encourages patrons to pass through dark tunnels representing dark periods of history, before emerging into a well-lit, contemplative space. Most of the galleries are small and tight, with low light and exhibits from floor to ceiling. The well-lit rotunda serves as the heart of the complex.

The theme of Gallery 1 is the "Mississippi Freedom Struggle," which documents the history, culture, and lives of black people in the state from the first arrival of African slaves through the end of the Civil War. Gallery 2, "Mississippi in Black and White", documents the time between the end of the Civil War and 1941. The focus is on lynching, the Ku Klux Klan, and Jim Crow. Five monuments in this gallery list the names of those who were lynched. Part of this gallery is dominated by an artificial tree with sprawling limbs, from which hang images from the Jim Crow era.

Gallery 3, at the center of the museum, lies beneath the museum's rotunda. Clerestory windows in the rotunda admit daylight, helping to brighten the room. It contains the This Little Light of Mine interactive sculpture, with lighted panels depicting the faces of activists killed during the civil rights movement.

Gallery 4 depicts the rise of the civil rights movement in Mississippi from 1941 to 1960. This gallery, titled "A Closed Society", contains two small immersive theaters, where short films document the impact of the U.S. Supreme Court's 1954 decision in Brown v. Board of Education and the 1955 murder of 14-year-old Emmett Till. On exhibit in this section are the doors to Bryant's Grocery, where the incident which ultimately led to the death of Till occurred. Also in this section is a segregated classroom, which juxtaposes the different experiences white and black children had during this period. Gallery 5's theme is "A Tremor in the Iceberg", a reference to the way early civil rights struggles between 1960 and 1962 foretold greater upheaval. (Note: The gallery's title refers to a 1961 letter which Bob Moses, the director of the Student Nonviolent Coordinating Committee Mississippi project, wrote while in jail in Mississippi. The letter said, in part, "This is Mississippi, the middle of the iceberg. This is a tremor in the middle of the iceberg from a stone that the builders rejected.") The gallery contains exhibits and images of the Freedom Riders, and a mock-up of an actual jail cell. A short documentary film in this gallery describes the life and civil rights activism of Medgar Evers. When the film ends, a spotlight focuses on rifle that killed him, exhibited nearby.

"I Question America", the theme of Gallery 6, documents the critical years of 1963 and 1964, and contains a recreation of a rural church where visitors can see a short film about Freedom Summer. A cross burned by the Klan on an African American family's lawn shards of stained glass from an African American church that was bombed, and a fingerprint kit used during the arrest of civil rights activists are on display here. An interactive exhibit allows patrons to explore the files of the Mississippi State Sovereignty Commission, a state agency whose mission was to research ways to oppose federal and court intervention against racial segregation. Gallery 7, titled "Black Empowerment", documents the many successes and setbacks of the Mississippi civil rights movement from 1965 to 1975. On exhibit here is the bullet-riddled pickup truck owned by Vernon Dahmer, a civil rights leader who died in 1966 after his home was attacked and burned to the ground by the Ku Klux Klan.

Gallery 8's theme, "Where Do We Go From Here?", is about contemplating the future of minority citizens in Mississippi. Interactive exhibits here encourage patrons to leave their own thoughts and ideas.

=== This Little Light of Mine sculpture ===
The concept of an illuminated, interactive sculpture was conceived by Hilferty & Associates and Monadnock Media. The idea was that "everybody has a light" (a contribution to make) and that no matter how deeply one despairs there is always a light (hope) somewhere.

The sculpture was designed by Cindy Thompson (Maine), founder of the design studio Transformit (Mississippi). The lighting and control system is by Communication Electronic Design (Kentucky).

The 40-foot (12 m) suspended sculpture consists of fabric-covered aluminum blades. Each blade has eight channels of LED lights, and each light is individually controlled by a computer.

As more people enter the central gallery were the sculpture is located, more lights flicker. Every 30 minutes, the songs This Little Light of Mine and Ain't Gonna' Let Nobody Turn Me Around play while the lights flicker and appear to move in time with the music. Children, college students, and adults recorded both songs at Malaco Studios in Jackson, Mississippi.

While the show is going on, the side panels also become illuminated.

Exhibits designer Hilferty & Associates from Ohio worked with Transformit founder and artist Cindy Thompson of Maine, media producers Monadnock Media from Massachusetts and lighting program engineers CED (Communication Electronic Design) from Kentucky.

Construction of the piece took three years. According to The Clarion-Ledger, the sculpture has been widely praised by national media.

=== New leadership ===
On July 11, 2023, Michael Morris was announced as the new Director of the Two Mississippi Museums—the Museum of Mississippi History and the Mississippi Civil Rights Museum. He has replaced Pamela D.C. Junior, who retired in June. Morris graduated from Jackson State University with a bachelor's and master's in history and political science. Morris has been with the Mississippi Department of Archives and History since 2016, gaining his supervisory management certificate from the Mississippi State Personnel Board.

== Attendance ==
Officials estimated that 180,000 people would visit the two museums in their first year. By February 22, 2018, more than 80,000 people had patronized the museums, and museum officials believed that attendance could make it the second-most visited civil rights museum in the South (after the National Civil Rights Museum in Tennessee). As of 2023 more than 500,000 visitors have come to the museum since its opening in December 2017.

== See also ==
- List of museums focused on African Americans
- Mississippi Department of Archives and History
- Museum of Mississippi History
- Tugaloo College
