= Mississippi Department of Archives and History =

Mississippi state government agency

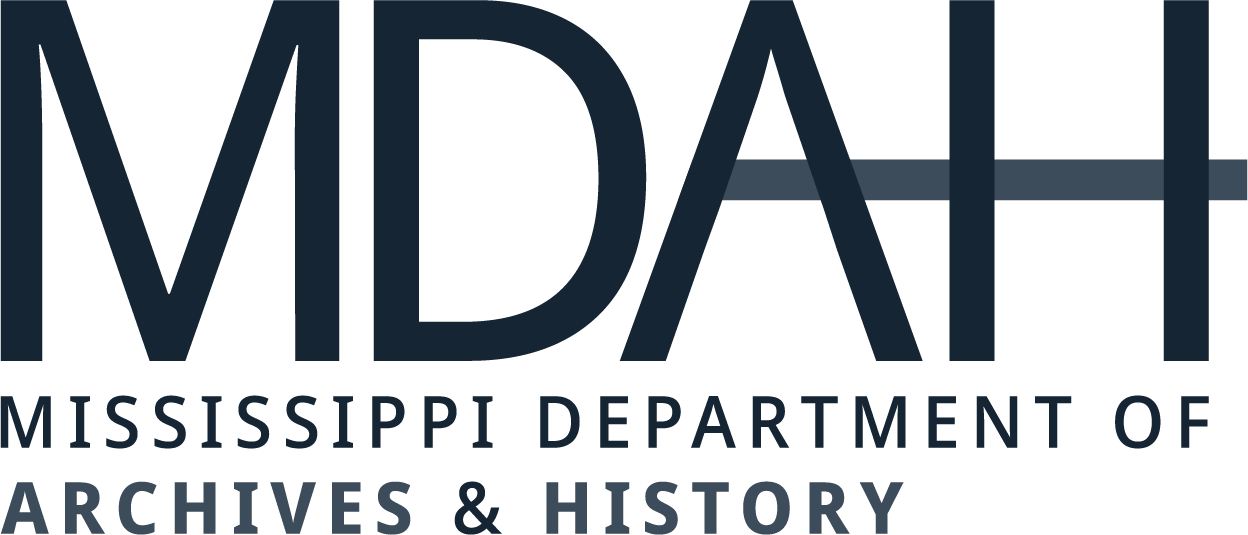

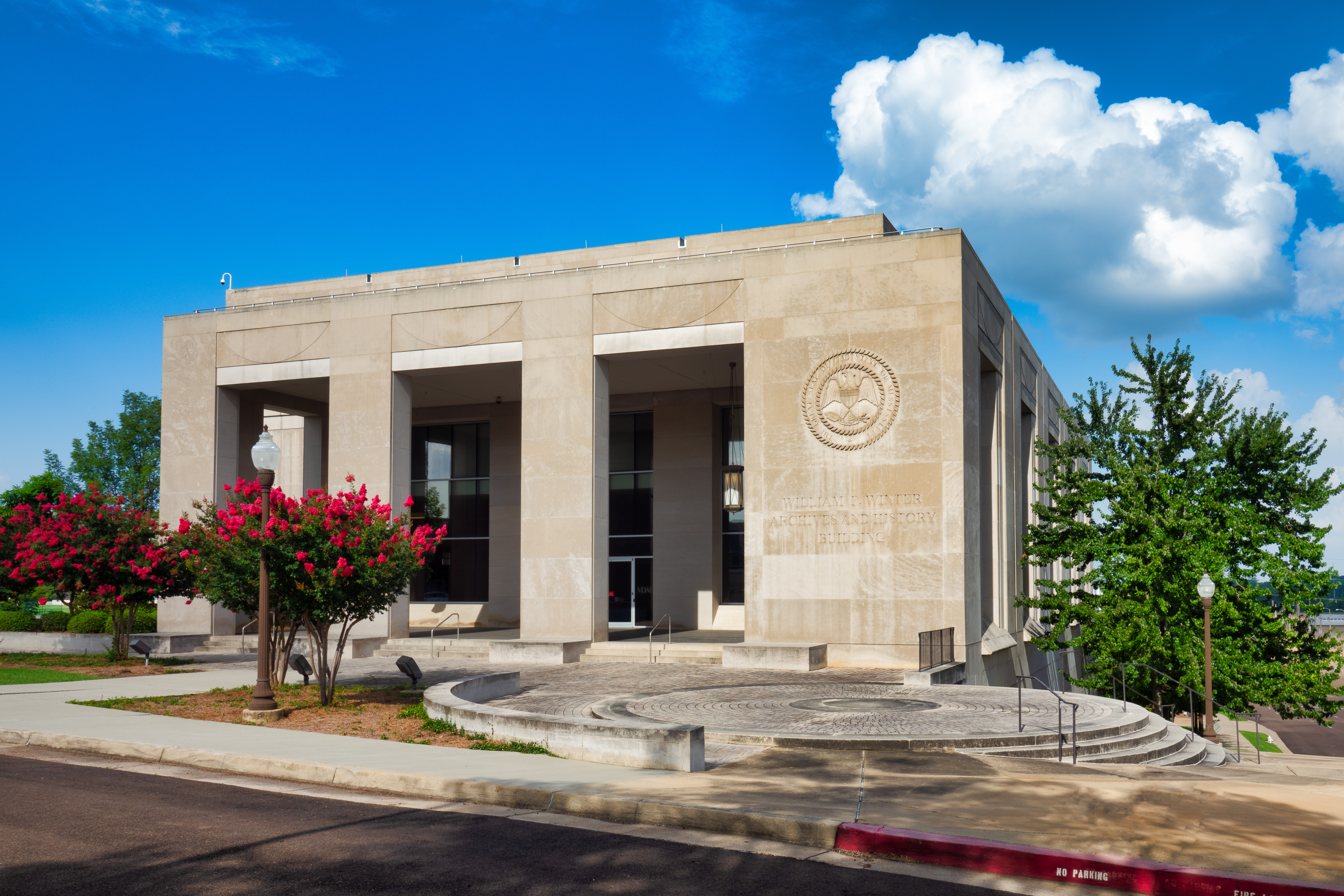
- William F. Winter Archives and History Building
- Formation: February 26, 1902 (124 years ago)
- Type: State Agency
- Purpose: Archive
- Location(s): 200 North Street, Jackson, Mississippi
- Coordinates: 32°18′02″N 90°10′43″W
- Region served: Mississippi
- Director: Barry White
- Budget: $10 million (2015)
- Staff: 122 (2015)
- Website: mdah.ms.gov

Mississippi Department of Archives and History (MDAH) is a state agency founded in 1902. It is the official archive of the Mississippi Government.

== Location ==
The Mississippi Department of Archives and History is located at 200 North St., Jackson, Mississippi next to the Museum of Mississippi History and the Mississippi Civil Rights Museum. The William F. Winter Archives and History Building was dedicated on November 7, 2003.

== History ==
The Mississippi Department of Archives and History developed from the Mississippi Historical Society in the interest of promoting and protecting "Southern Identity" through acquisition and preservation of historical records, especially those records pertaining to the American Civil War. Legislation authorizing creation of Department of Archives and History was signed by Mississippi Governor Andrew Longino on February 26, 1902. The Department of Archives and History is the second oldest state department of archives and history in the United States.

In 1902, Dunbar Rowland, an attorney and historian, was selected as the first Director of the department and served in that position until his death in 1937.

The Mississippi Department of Archives and History was tasked with providing clerical support of the redesign of the Mississippi state flag under the House Bill 1796, which established the Commission to Redesign the Mississippi State Flag. On January 11, 2021 Governor Tate Reeves signed House Bill No. 1 which enacted the new Mississippi State Flag design "In God We Trust" into law.

== Mission ==
The mission of Mississippi Department of Archives and History:

By preserving Mississippi’s diverse historic resources, and sharing them with people around the world, MDAH inspires discovery of stories that connect our lives and shape our future.

== Organizational structure and facilities ==
A director and a nine-member board of trustees presides over the Mississippi Department of Archives and History and its five divisions, which include:

- Administration
- Archives and Records Services
- Historic Preservation
- Museums
- Programs and Communication

Administrative offices, as well as archivist work areas and archive storage areas, are located in the William F. Winter Archives and History Building. Completed in 2003, the 6-story structure contains 146,000 ft^{2} (13,600 m^{2}).

The Historic Preservation Division is housed in the Charlotte Capers Archives and History Building, located at 100 South State Street, Jackson. This division administers Historical Markers in Mississippi, Mississippi Landmarks, and National Register of Historic Places in Mississippi.

The Museum Division provides administrative oversight for the following facilities and locations:

- Eudora Welty House
- Manship House Museum
- Old Capitol Museum
- Grand Village of the Natchez Indians
- Historic Jefferson College
- Windsor Ruins
- Winterville Mounds
- Museum of Mississippi History
- Mississippi Civil Rights Museum

The Programs and Communication Division, established in 2017, oversees programming, public information, publications, marketing, and education.

== See also ==
- Charlotte Capers
- Mississippi State Flag
- List of historical societies in Mississippi
