= Greenwood Cemetery (Jackson, Mississippi) =

Historic cemetery in Hinds County, Mississippi

- U.S. National Register of Historic Places
- Mississippi Landmark
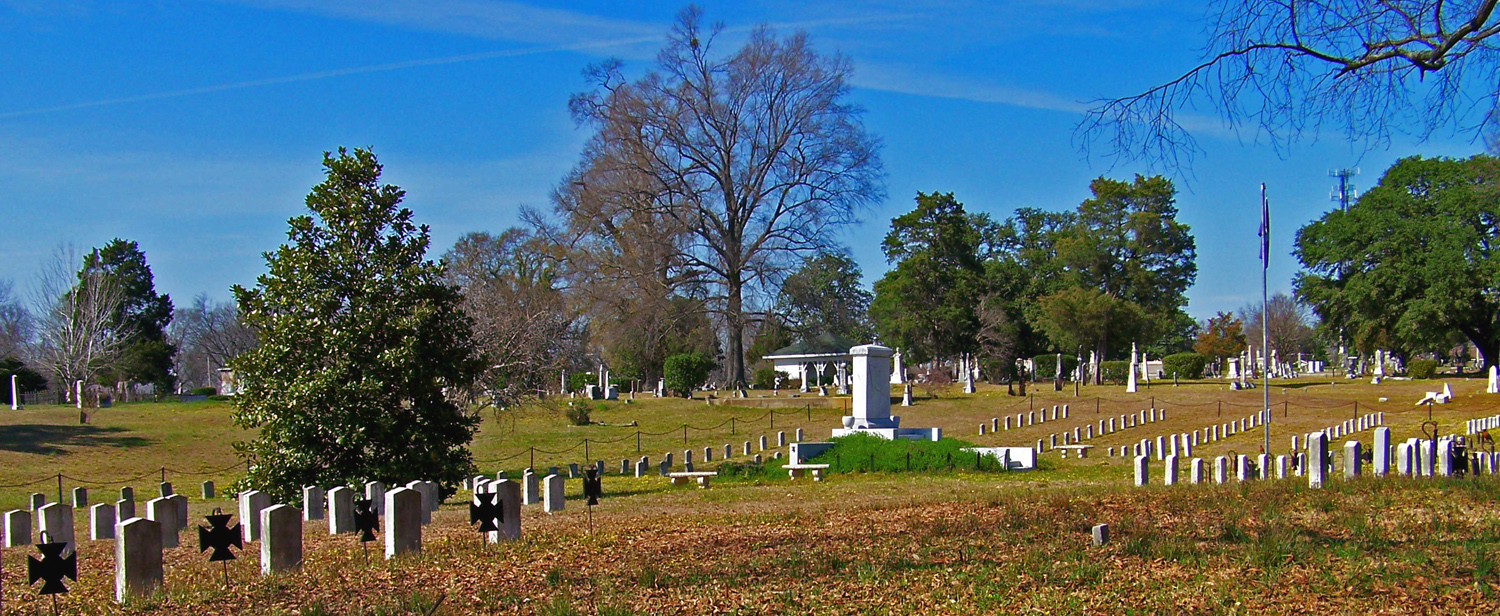
- A view of Greenwood Cemetery showing the graves of Confederate soldiers.

- Location within Mississippi Location within the United States
- Location: Bounded by West, Davis, Lamar and George Sts., Jackson, Mississippi
- Coordinates: 32°18′30″N 90°11′02″W
- Built: 1822
- Website: www.greenwoodcemeteryjackson.org
- NRHP reference No.: 84000474
- USMS No.: 049-JAC-0331-NR-ML

Significant dates
- Added to NRHP: December 20, 1984
- Designated USMS: August 1, 1984

Greenwood Cemetery is a cemetery located in downtown Jackson, Mississippi. Still in use, it was established by a federal land grant on November 21, 1821. It was originally known simply as "The Graveyard" and later as "City Cemetery" before the present name was adopted in 1899. It is the final resting place of Confederate generals, former governors of Mississippi, mayors of Jackson, and other notable figures, the most recent of whom is internationally acclaimed author Eudora Welty. The graves of over 100 "unknown" Confederate soldiers are also located here. Greenwood Cemetery was listed on the National Register of Historic Places and as a Mississippi Landmark in 1984.

The "garden park" type cemetery contains the largest collection of everblooming "own root" (not grafted) antique and modern shrubs roses in the country – several hundred shrubs representing over 40 named cultivars – as well as numerous hardy bulbs and other flowering shrubs and trees.

== Notable interments ==
=== Confederate generals ===
- Daniel Weisiger Adams
- William Wirt Adams
- William Barksdale
- Samuel Wragg Ferguson
- Richard Griffith
- James Argyle Smith

=== Mississippi governors ===
- Albert Gallatin Brown
- John Isaac Guion
- Charles Lynch
- Alexander Gallatin McNutt
- George Poindexter
- Abram Marshall Scott
- William Lewis Sharkey
- William Forrest Winter

=== Others ===
- Erasmus R. Burt
- Perry Cohea
- Wiley P. Harris
- James D. Lynch
- Edmund Richardson
- Eudora Welty
- Kathryn Slaughter Wittichen

== See also ==
- List of governors of Mississippi
