= Perry Cohea =

American pioneer

Perry Cohea was an American pioneer of the early federal period in Tennessee and Mississippi. He is referred to in historic sources as Major. In the 1830s, he participated in the United States government's removal of the Choctaw from their Mississippi homelands.

== Career ==
In Tennessee, Cohea served the United States government in the Chickasaw Agency. He was a courier for General James Robertson of Tennessee. He also served as a town marshal in Columbia, Tennessee prior to removing to Mississippi.

In 1822 Cohea moved to Lawrence County, Mississippi, an area where European Americans were moving. He briefly became a merchant in Jackson, Mississippi in 1834.

By an act of the legislature in 1836, he was appointed to serve as a Commissioner of Public Buildings to oversee the building of the State Capitol, after the territory was admitted as a state. He also served on a commission selected by Governor Charles Lynch to determine a site on which to build the state penitentiary.

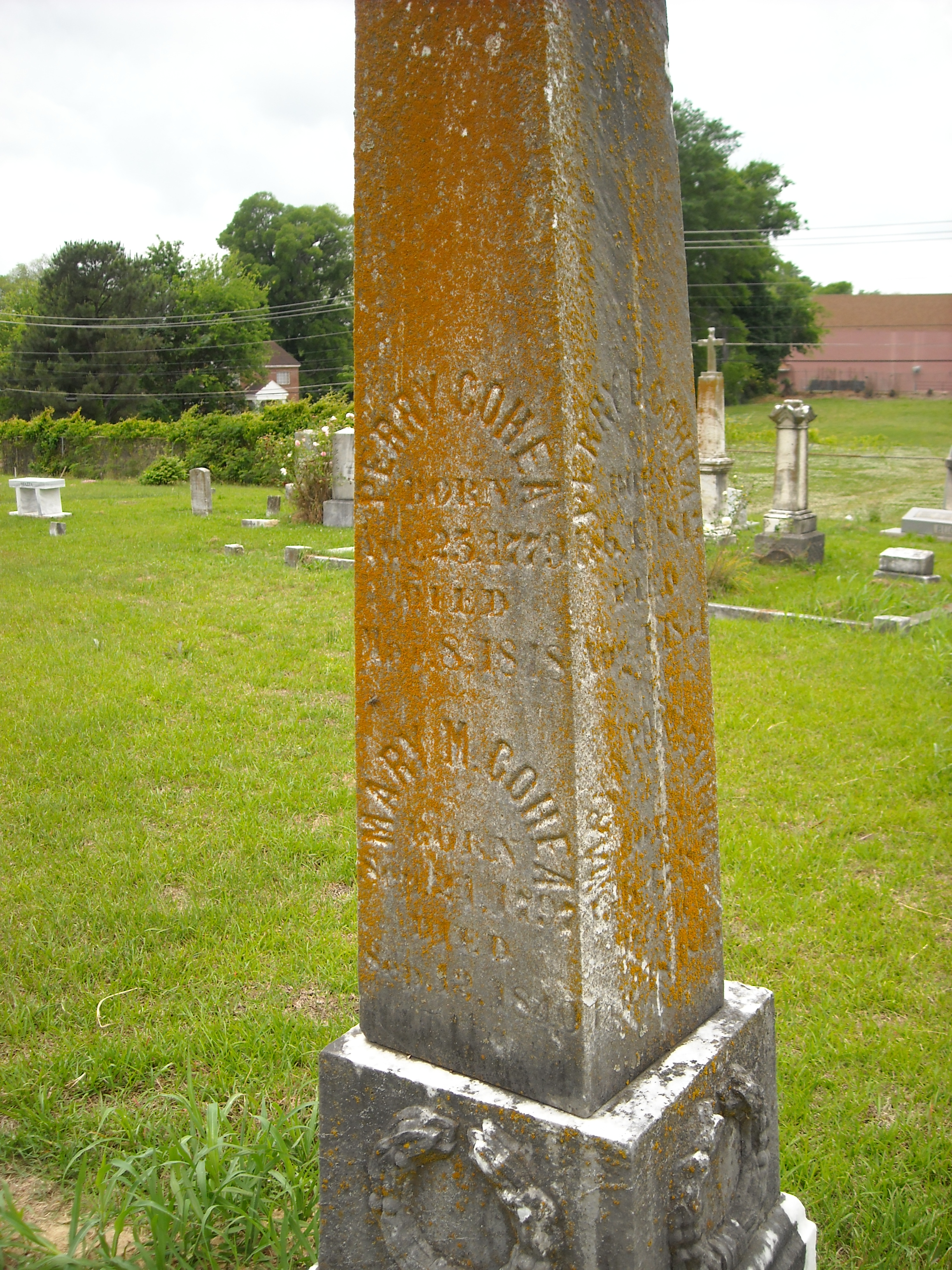
Perry Cohea's grave

== Death and burial ==
Cohea died in 1848. He is buried in the Greenwood Cemetery in Jackson, Mississippi.
