= Museum of Mississippi History =

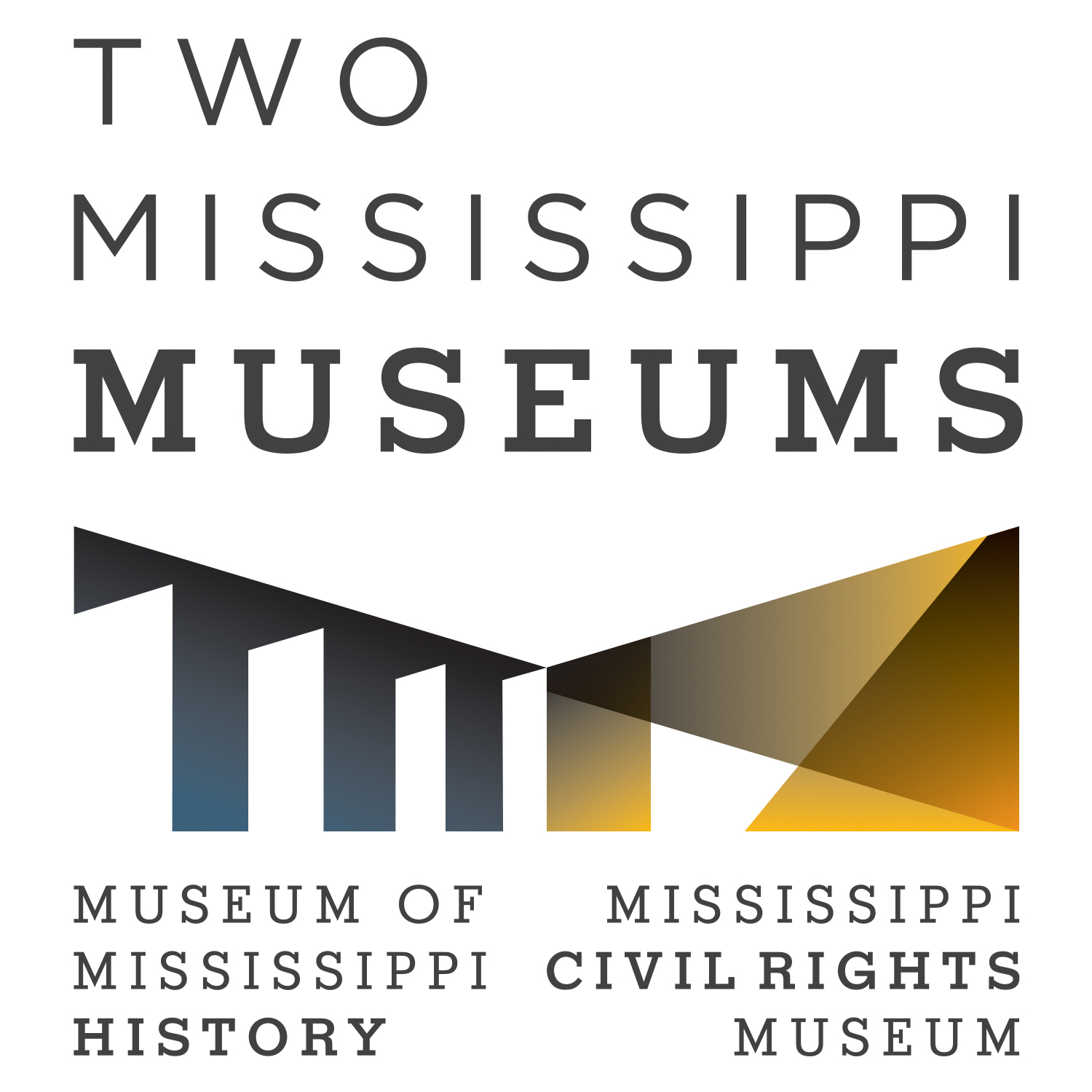

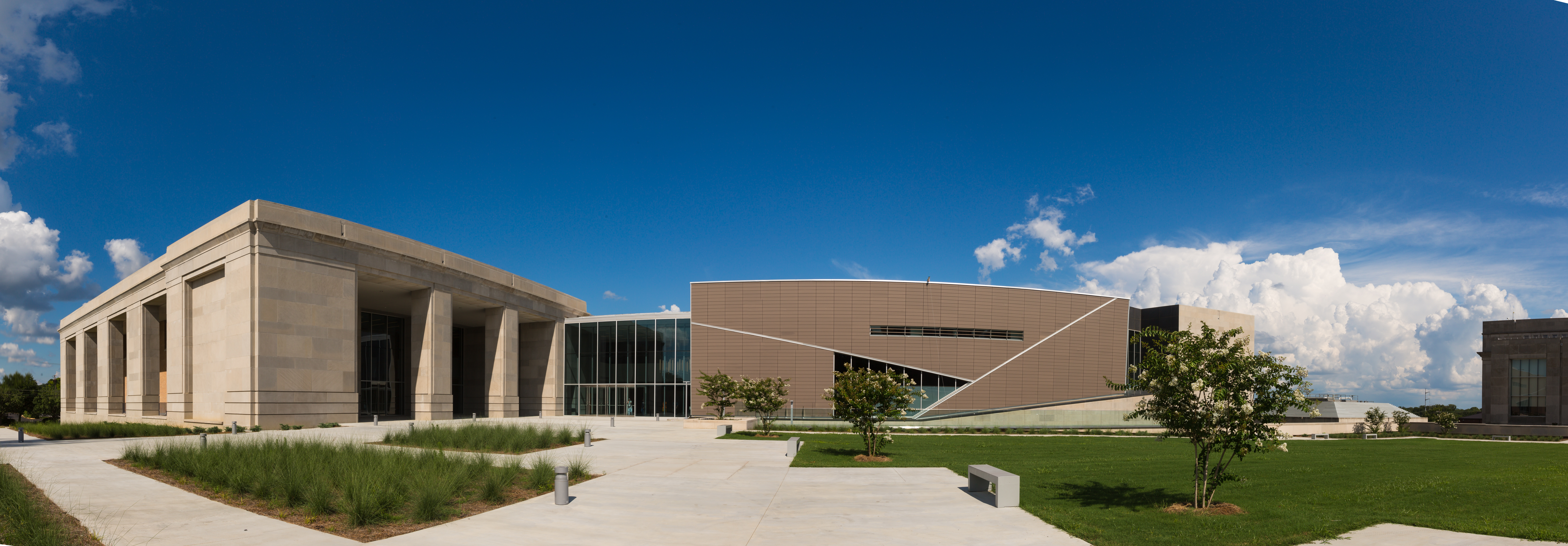
- Museum of Mississippi History (center left), next to the Mississippi Civil Rights Museum (center right)

- Location within Mississippi
- Established: December 9, 2017
- Location: 222 North St, Jackson, Mississippi
- Coordinates: 32.301807°N 90.17809°W
- Type: Public
- Visitors: 500,000+
- Director: Michael Morris
- Website: mmh.mdah.ms.gov

The Museum of Mississippi History is a museum in Jackson, Mississippi located at 222 North St. #2205. The museum opened December 9, 2017, in conjunction with the adjacent Mississippi Civil Rights Museum in celebration of Mississippi's bicentennial. The theme of the history museum is "One Mississippi, Many Stories". Both museums are administered by the Mississippi Department of Archives and History (MDAH).

== Background ==
In 1998, the Mississippi State Legislature authorized MDAH to begin planning construction of a new Museum of Mississippi History. Subsequently, a coalition of Mississippi architects – Eley Guild Hardy; Cooke Douglass Farr Lemons; and Dale Partners – was selected to design the building in association with The Freelon Group (Perkins&Will) of Durham, NC. Because of unforeseen state funding priorities created by Hurricane Katrina in 2005 and subsequent budget shortfalls, appropriations for museum construction were delayed.

In 2011, Governor Haley Barbour and the Mississippi Legislature approved $38 million in bond funding to begin construction of the two museums. The legislative bill specified that the museums were to be operational by 2017 to coincide with the bicentennial year when Mississippi was admitted to statehood. An additional $16.6 million bond authorization for the museums was approved by Governor Phil Bryant in 2016.

In total, the Mississippi State Legislature appropriated $90 million for construction of the two museums. An additional $19 million for exhibits and endowments was provided through private donations, such as the Foundation for Mississippi History. Construction began in December 2013 by Thrash Commercial Contractors from Brandon, MS. The museums opened December 9, 2017.

The two museums share an auditorium, classrooms, storage areas, and a workshop for preparation of exhibits. The museums cover an area of 200,000 ft^{2} (19,000 m^{2}).

== Exhibits ==
The Museum of Mississippi History examines 15,000 years of state history through exhibits, educational programs, and historical artifacts. As of 2022, there were 8 galleries based on historic timelines:

- The First People (13,000 BC – AD 1518) – Native Americans in Mississippi
- Cultural Crossroads (1519 – 1798) – Native Americans, Europeans, and Africans
- Joining the United States (1799 – 1832) – Territory, Statehood, and Treaties
- Cotton Kingdom (1833 – 1865) – Cotton, Enslavement, and the American Civil War
- The World Remade (1866 – 1902) – Freedom, Reconstruction, and Regression
- Promise and Peril (1903 – 1927) – Progressivism, Repression, and World War I
- Bridging Hardship (1928 – 1945) – Great Depression, New Deal, and World War II
- Forging Ahead (1946 – Present) – Civil Rights, Diversification, and Innovation
