= 13th Mississippi Infantry Regiment =

- Active: 1861-1865
- Country: Confederate States of America
- Allegiance: Mississippi
- Branch: Confederate States Army
- Type: Infantry
- Size: Regiment
- Battles: American Civil War: First Battle of Bull Run; Seven Days Battles; Battle of Antietam; Battle of Fredericksburg; Battle of Chancellorsville; Battle of Gettysburg; Battle of Chickamauga; Battle of Fort Sanders; Battle of the Wilderness; Battle of Spotsylvania Court House; Battle of Cold Harbor; Battle of Cedar Creek

Commanders
- Notable commanders: William Barksdale

The 13th Mississippi Infantry Regiment was a unit of the Confederate States Army from Mississippi. As part of the Army of Northern Virginia, the 13th Mississippi took part in many battles of the Eastern theater of the American Civil War, as well as some battles in Georgia and Tennessee. The 13th Mississippi Regiment surrendered at Appomattox Court House on April 9, 1865.

== History ==
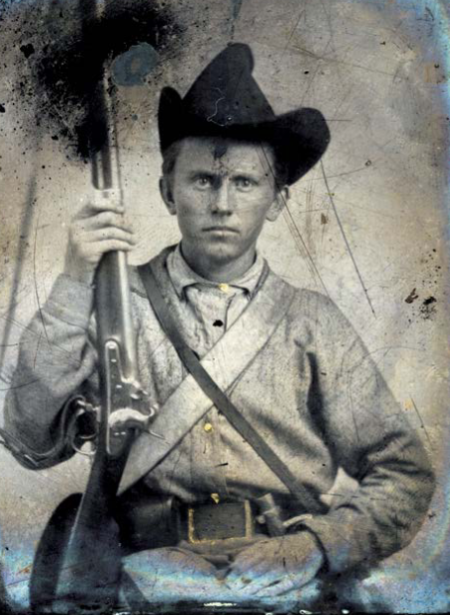
Henry Rowland, Company A, 13th Mississippi Infantry, holding a Springfield Model 1842 musket.

The 13th Regiment was formed on May 14, 1861, from volunteer companies assembled at Corinth, Mississippi. William Barksdale, a US Congressman and prominent "Fire-eater" was elected as colonel, leading him to resign his commission as brigadier general in Mississippi's state armed forces. In July the Regiment was sent to Tennessee, then onward to Virginia. Upon arrival, the Regiment was immediately sent to the battlefield, taking part in the First Battle of Bull Run under the brigade of General Jubal A. Early. Four detached companies from the 13th took part in the Battle of Ball's Bluff in October.

The regiment spent the winter in camp in Virginia, then re-enlisted for 3 years in April, 1862. During the Seven Days Battles, the Regiment was assigned to General Richard Griffith's brigade. The 13th fought at Savage's Station, where brigade commander General Griffith was killed, and Malvern Hill. Col. William Barksdale was then promoted to brigadier general to take Griffith's place, and Lieutenant Colonel Kennon McElroy was promoted to command of the 13th. At the Battle of Harpers Ferry in September, Barksdale's brigade seized the heights around the town of Harper's Ferry, leading the Union garrison to surrender. The 13th then fought at the Battle of Antietam, suffering a 31% casualty rate, and the Battle of Fredericksburg in Maryland. At the Battle of Chancellorsville, the 13th was among Barksdale's troops assigned to hold the heights above the town of Fredericksburg against a Federal advance.

During the Battle of Gettysburg, on the afternoon of the 2nd day of the battle, Barksdale's Mississippi brigade charged the Northern lines at The Peach Orchard, with Barksdale personally leading the charge on horseback. This attack pushed back Union General Andrew A. Humphreys's troops, but a counterattack by General George L. Willard pushed the Mississippians back and Barksdale was mortally wounded. The 13th Regiment took heavy casualties during this battle, and many wounded men were left behind in field hospitals when the Confederates retreated. The Regiment suffered a 34% casualty rate at Gettysburg. The Regiment was then sent to the Western theater, fighting in the Battle of Chickamauga in Georgia in September. In Tennessee, the 13th fought at the Siege of Knoxville, where they took part in the bloody assault on Fort Sanders on November 29, where Col. McElroy of the 13th was killed. The Union officer defending the fort, Captain Orlando Metcalfe Poe, reported the capture of the 13th Mississippi's regimental flag, and said "In spite of the gallantry and persistency of the attack, it was handsomely repulsed, with a loss to the enemy of almost the entire which led the assault....I know of no instance in history where a storming party was so nearly annihilated."

In the spring of 1864, the regiment rejoined the Army of Northern Virginia in the eastern theater, taking part in the Battle of the Wilderness, the Battle of Spotsylvania Courthouse, and the Battle of Cold Harbor. The Regiment was sent to assist General Jubal Early's campaign in the Shenandoah Valley, fighting at the Battle of Cedar Creek. After this defeat, the 13th was sent to Richmond, Virginia and was present at the final surrender of the Army of Northern Virginia at Appomattox Court House on April 9, 1865. At the time of the surrender, only 4 officers and 81 men of the 13th Regiment remaining, from an original strength of 1,200.

== Notable members ==
- Thomas H. Woods, Chief Justice of the Supreme Court of Mississippi, 1889–1900.
- Simon Baruch, physician and public health advocate.

== Commanders ==
Commanders of the 13th Mississippi Infantry:

- Col. William Barksdale, promoted to brigadier general 1862, killed at Gettysburg, 1863.
- Col. J.W. Carter, killed at Gettysburg.
- Col. Kennon McElory, killed at Knoxville, 1863.
- Lt. Col. M.H. Whitaker
- Lt. Col. John M. Bradley
- Lt. Col. A.G. O'Brien

== Organization ==
Companies of the 13th Mississippi Infantry:

- Company A, "Winston Guards"
- Company B, "Wayne Rifles"
- Company C, "Kemper Legion"
- Company D, "Newton Rifles"
- Company E, "Alumucha Infantry" of Lauderdale County.
- Company F, "Lauderdale Zouaves"
- Company G, "Secessionists" of Quitman.
- Company H, "Spartan Band" of Sparta.
- Company I, "Minute Men" of Attala County.
- Company K, "Pettus Guards" of Lauderdale County.

== See also ==
- List of Mississippi Civil War Confederate units
