= James Argyle Smith =

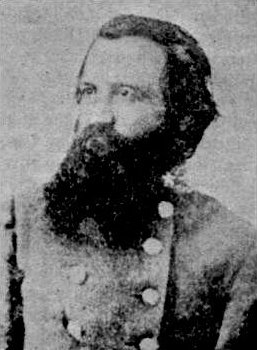
- James Argyle Smith, Brigadier General in the Confederate Army
- Born: July 1, 1831; Maury County, Tennessee
- Died: December 6, 1901 (aged 70); Jackson, Mississippi
- Burial place: Greenwood Cemetery (Jackson, Mississippi)
- Military career
- Allegiance: United States of America; Confederate States of America
- Branch: United States Army; Confederate States Army
- Service years: 1853–61 (USA); 1861–65 (CSA)
- Rank: First Lieutenant (USA); Brigadier General (CSA)
- Conflicts: Sioux Expedition: Battle of Ash Hollow; Utah War; American Civil War: Battle of Shiloh; Battle of Perryville; Battle of Murfreesboro; Battle of Chickamauga; Battle of Missionary Ridge; Battle of Atlanta; Second Battle of Franklin; Battle of Bentonville

James Argyle Smith (July 1, 1831 – December 6, 1901) was a United States Army officer, and a graduate of West Point. He is known for being a Confederate brigadier general during the Civil War, his works in the educational system in Mississippi, and in the Bureau of Indian Affairs.

== Early life and career ==
James Smith was born on 1 July 1831 in Maury County, Tennessee. He went to West Point, graduated in 1853, and became a second lieutenant in the infantry. Smith served in various posts in the west including the Jefferson Barracks Military Post. Smith fought at the Battle of Ash Hollow against the Sioux in 1855. Then from 1857 to 1858, Smith fought in the Utah War against the Mormons. One year after returning from the Utah War Smith was promoted to a first lieutenant. In May 1861 Smith resigned his commission to join the Confederate Army.

== Civil War service ==
Smith joined the Confederate Army in 1861 with the rank of lieutenant. In March 1862 he became a major and the adjutant-general to General Leonidas Polk. At the Battle of Shiloh Smith became the lieutenant-colonel of the Second Tennessee Infantry Regiment. General Bushrod Johnson commended Smith on his bravery at the Battle of Perryville and he was put in command of the 5th Confederate Infantry. His bravery was also noticed at the Battle of Murfreesboro by both General Cleburne and General Leonidas Polk. After his performance at the Battle of Chickamauga and the praise he received from Polk, Smith was promoted to brigadier general. At the Battle of Missionary Ridge General Smith attacked Sherman's flank preventing the Union Army of blocking off General Bragg's retreat. During the Battle of Missionary Ridge Smith was shot through both thighs while leading his men. After recovering Smith fought at the Battle of Atlanta where his brigade captured fifteen artillery pieces. During this battle he was wounded again. He was under the command of Cleburne at the Second Battle of Franklin, and after Cleburne's death Smith took over command at Nashville. General Smith and General William Bate led Cheatham's corps at the Battle of Bentonville.

== Postbellum career and death ==
After starting a farm in Mississippi Smith was elected the Mississippi State Superintendent of Public Education from 1878 to 1886. He then became an agent of the Bureau of Indian Affairs from 1893 to 1897. He later become the Marshal of the Supreme Court of Mississippi. James Argyle Smith died on December 6, 1901, in Jackson, Mississippi and was buried at the Greenwood Cemetery there.

== See also ==
- List of American Civil War generals (Confederate)
