= William Barksdale =

American politician and Confederate Army general (1821-1863)

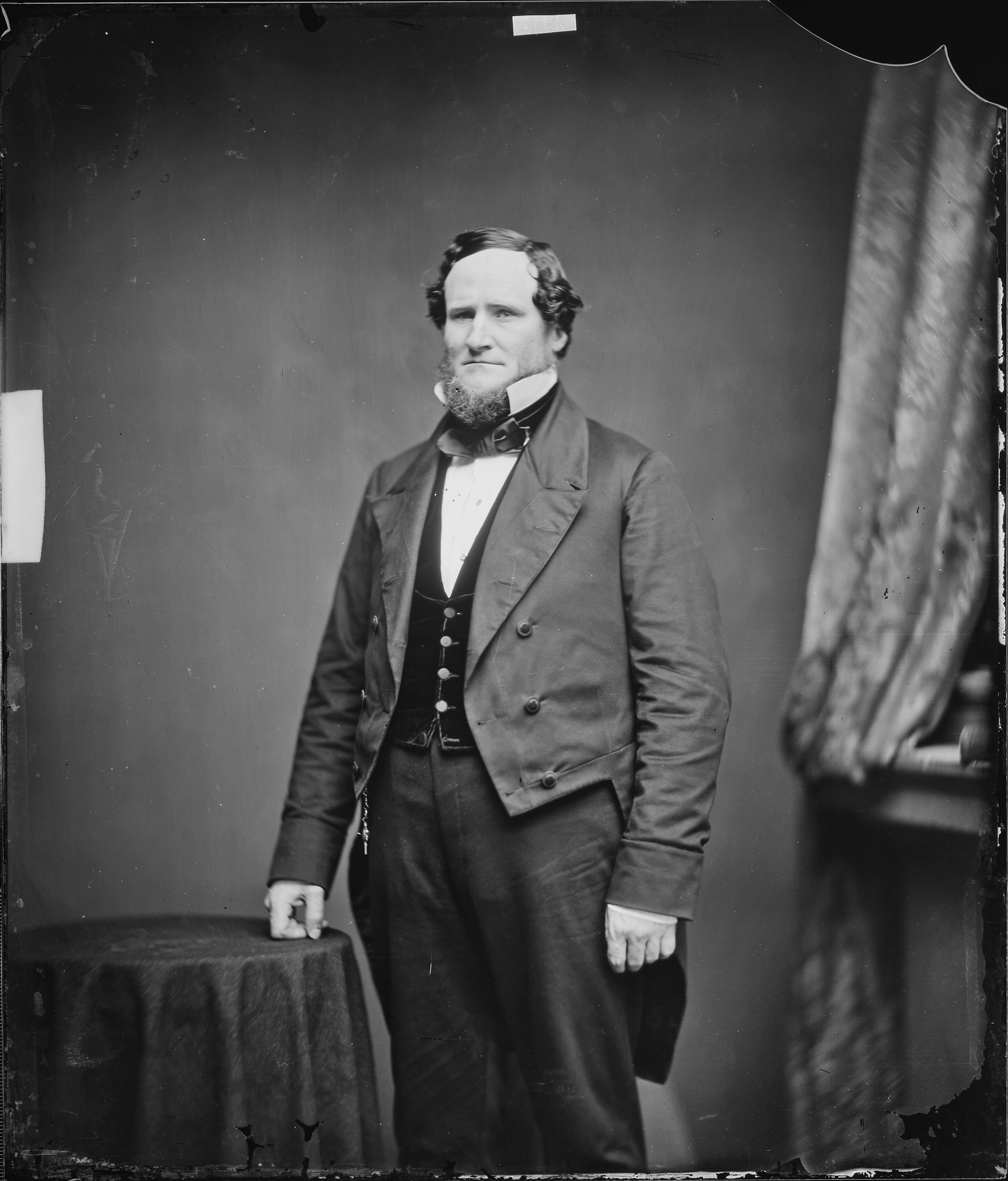

Member of the U.S. House of Representatives from Mississippi
- In office March 4, 1853 – January 21, 1861
- Preceded by: District established (AL); Otho R. Singleton (3rd)
- Succeeded by: District eliminated (AL); Henry Barry (3rd)
- Constituency: At-large district (1853-55); 3rd district (1855-61)

Personal details
- Born: August 21, 1821 Smyrna, Tennessee
- Died: July 3, 1863 (aged 41) Gettysburg, Pennsylvania
- Resting place: Greenwood Cemetery; Jackson, Mississippi
- Party: Democratic
- Profession: Newspaper editor, soldier
- Nickname: "Old Barks"

Military service
- Allegiance: United States of America; Confederate States of America
- Branch/service: United States Army; Confederate States Army
- Years of service: 1847–1848 (USA); 1861–1863 (CSA)
- Rank: Captain (USA); Brigadier General (CSA)
- Unit: 2nd Mississippi Infantry (USA)
- Commands: 13th Mississippi Infantry (CSA); Barksdale's Mississippi Brigade
- Battles/wars: Mexican–American War; American Civil War: First Battle of Bull Run; Battle of Ball's Bluff; Peninsula Campaign; Seven Days Battles; Battle of Antietam; Battle of Fredericksburg; Battle of Chancellorsville; Battle of Gettysburg †

William Barksdale (August 21, 1821 – July 3, 1863) was an American lawyer, newspaper editor, U.S. Representative, and Confederate general in the American Civil War. He served four terms as Mississippi's 3rd district's member of the U.S. House of Representatives, from 1853 to 1861.

A staunch secessionist, he was mortally wounded during the Battle of Gettysburg during an attack on U.S. Army forces near Cemetery Ridge.

== Early life ==
William Barksdale was born in Smyrna, Tennessee, the son of William Barksdale and Nancy Hervey Lester Barksdale. Barksdale was the older brother of Ethelbert Barksdale, who would serve in both the antebellum U.S. Congress representing Mississippi's 7th district and then join the Confederate States Congress during the American Civil War. The Barksdales were of English ancestry and came to America during the 1600s.

Barksdale graduated from the University of Nashville and practiced law in Mississippi from the age of 21, but gave up his practice to become the editor of the Columbus [Mississippi] Democrat, a pro-slavery newspaper.

Barksdale enlisted in the 2nd Mississippi Infantry Regiment and served in the Mexican–American War as a captain and quartermaster, but often participated in the infantry fighting as well.

== U.S. Congress ==
After the war, Barksdale became active in politics, advocating for the Compromise of 1850. His political visibility and recent military service gave him a strong profile as a political candidate. In 1852, he successfully ran for a seat in the U.S. House of Representatives. Barksdale would win re-election, serving four terms from 1853 to 1861.

=== Tenure ===
Representing Mississippi, Barksdale quickly immersed himself in the national debates over slavery, representing the pro-white position. Barksdale was also a strong supporter of low tariffs, another hotly debated issue of the day.

=== Temperament and controversies ===
Barksdale was considered to be one of the most ardent of all the "Fire-Eaters" in the House and became known as one who would quickly resort to fisticuffs when the temperature of the debate grew hotter. Barksdale allegedly stood by the side of Representative Preston S. Brooks as Brooks attacked Massachusetts abolitionist Senator Charles Sumner in the Senate chamber with a cane, although he was not one of the members that the House tried to censure after the incident.

Before the American Civil War, Barksdale inadvertently helped stop one of the most notorious incidents of violence in U.S. legislative history. On February 5, 1858, a brawl between pro- and anti-slavery legislators started on the House floor. During the melee, Barksdale swung at Illinois congressman Elihu Washburne. Washburne's brother Cadwallader, a Wisconsin congressman, grabbed at Barksdale such that it knocked his wig off. An embarrassed Barksdale put it back on backward, causing both sides to break out laughing and stopping the fight.

== Personal wealth ==
Barksdale was a slave owner. His legal and newspaper work and marriage to a wealthy family made Barksdale relatively wealthy. Contemporary reports indicate that by 1860, he owned 36 slaves and a large plantation.

== American Civil War ==
After Mississippi declared secession, Barksdale resigned from Congress to become adjutant general, and then quartermaster general, of the Mississippi Militia, at the rank of brigadier general, with a March 1, 1861, date of rank. On May 1, Barksdale was appointed colonel in the Confederate States Army of the 13th Mississippi Infantry Regiment, leading it in the First Battle of Bull Run that summer and the Battle of Ball's Bluff in October. The following spring, Barksdale took the regiment to the Virginia Peninsula and fought in the Peninsula Campaign and the Seven Days Battles. The brigade commander, Brig. Gen. Richard Griffith, was mortally wounded at the Battle of Savage's Station on June 29, 1862. Barksdale assumed command of the brigade and led it in a bloody and futile charge at the Battle of Malvern Hill. The brigade became known as "Barksdale's Mississippi Brigade." He was promoted to brigadier general on August 12, 1862.

In the Northern Virginia Campaign, Barksdale's brigade was stationed at Harpers Ferry and thus did not participate in the Second Battle of Bull Run. In the Maryland Campaign, the brigade was assigned to the division of Maj. Gen. Lafayette McLaws in Lt. Gen. James Longstreet's First Corps of the Army of Northern Virginia. It was one of the brigades that attacked Maryland Heights, leading to the surrender of the U.S. Army garrison at Harpers Ferry. At the subsequent Battle of Antietam, McLaws's Division defended the West Woods against the assault by Maj. Gen. John Sedgwick's division, defending the Confederate left flank. At the Battle of Fredericksburg, Barksdale's brigade defended the waterfront of the city from U.S. soldiers attempting to cross the Rappahannock River, sniping at infantry and engineers from buildings that had been turned into rubble by U.S. artillery.

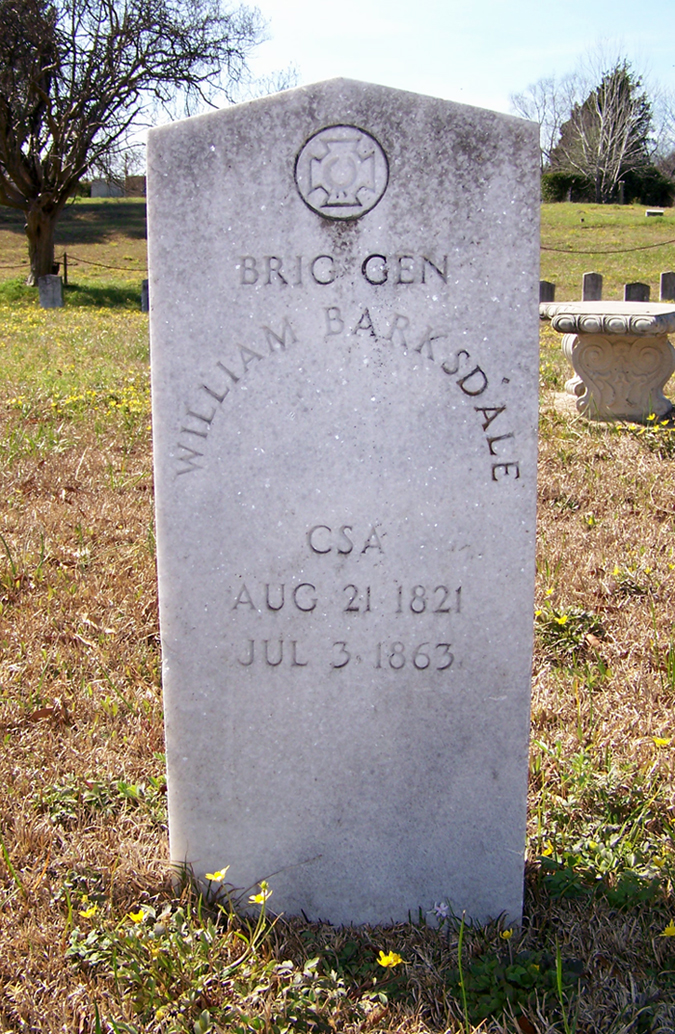
General Barksdale's cenotaph in Greenwood Cemetery, Jackson, Mississippi

At the Battle of Chancellorsville in May 1863, Barksdale's brigade was one of the few units in James Longstreet's Corps that was present at the battle; most of the corps was detached for duty in Suffolk, Virginia. Once again, Barksdale's brigade defended the heights above Fredericksburg, this time against his previous adversary, Sedgwick, whose VI Corps was over ten times the size of the brigade. Sedgwick's assault was successful, and Barksdale pulled back after delaying the U.S. forces, but he rallied the brigade and retook the lost ground the next day.

At the Battle of Gettysburg, Barksdale's brigade arrived with McLaws's Division after the first day of battle, July 1, 1863. The plan from General Robert E. Lee was for Longstreet's Corps to maneuver into position and attack northeast, up the Emmitsburg Road, to roll up the U.S. left flank on July 2. Barksdale's sector of the attack placed him directly at the tip of the salient in the U.S. line anchored at the Peach Orchard, defended by the U.S. III Corps. At about 5:30 p.m., Barksdale's brigade burst from the woods and assaulted the line, described as one of the most breathtaking spectacles of the war. A U.S. Army colonel said, "It was the grandest charge that was ever made by mortal man." Although Barksdale ordered subordinate commanders to walk during the charge, he rode on horseback "in front, leading the way, hat off, his wispy hair shining so that it reminded [a Confederate staff officer] of 'the white plume of Navarre'."

=== Death ===
On July 2, 1863, the Confederates attacked the U.S. Army brigade defending the Peach Orchard line, wounding and capturing the brigade commander himself. Some of Barksdale's regiments turned to the north and shattered Maj. Gen. Andrew A. Humphreys's division. Others of Barksdale's regiments went straight ahead. By the time the Confederates had gone as far as Plum Run, a mile into the assault, a brigade under U.S. Colonel George L. Willard counterattacked. Barksdale was wounded in his left knee, followed by a cannonball to his left foot, and finally was hit by another bullet to his chest, knocking him off his horse. Surprisingly, the two bullet wounds he suffered were from members of a New York brigade which his brigade had captured at Harpers Ferry in 1862. Barksdale told an aide, W.R. Boyd, "I am killed! Tell my wife and children that I died fighting at my post." Barksdale's troops left him for dead on the field, and he died the next morning, on July 3, in a U.S. field hospital (the Joseph Hummelbaugh farmhouse). He was initially buried under a tree in the yard of the farmhouse. His wooden headstone had the words “Brigadier General Barksdale of Mississippi McLaw’s Division, Longstreet’s Corps Died on the morning of 3rd July, 1863 Eight years a representative in United States Congress. Shot through the left breast, and leg broken below the knee.”

After the war, in January 1867, Barksdale's remains were exhumed and sent to South Carolina; then, later interred in the Barksdale family plot of Greenwood Cemetery, Jackson, Mississippi, with no marker, but he has cenotaphs in both Greenwood Cemetery and in Friendship Cemetery, Columbus, Mississippi.

== In popular media ==
Barksdale is portrayed in the film Gettysburg and in the prequel, Gods and Generals, by Lester Kinsolving, who is a relative of Barksdale.

Barksdale is also featured in the 2011 History Channel film Gettysburg.

The streets in the Potomac Crossing subdivision in Leesburg, Virginia, are named (in part) after the regimental commanders of the Battle of Ball's Bluff (October 21, 1861). Barksdale Drive, named for Barksdale, is the primary east-west conduit in the development, running just short of a mile to either end of the neighborhood.

== See also ==
- List of American Civil War generals (Confederate)

== Notes ==
U.S. House of Representatives
Preceded by Vacant	Member of the U.S. House of Representatives from Mississippi's at-large congressional district 1853–1855	Succeeded by District established
Preceded by Otho R. Singleton	Member of the U.S. House of Representatives from Mississippi's 3rd congressional district 1855–1859	Succeeded by Henry W. Barry
