= Richard Griffith (general) =

Brigadier general in the Confederate States Army during the American Civil War

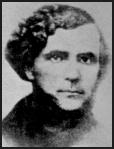
- Richard Griffith
- Born: January 11, 1814; Philadelphia, Pennsylvania, U.S.
- Died: June 29, 1862 (aged 48); Richmond, Virginia, C.S.
- Burial place: Greenwood Cemetery, Jackson, Mississippi
- Military career
- Allegiance: United States; Confederate States of America
- Branch: US Army; Confederate States Army
- Service years: 1846–1847, 1861–1862
- Rank: Brigadier General
- Unit: Army of Northern Virginia
- Commands: Griffith's Brigade
- Conflicts: Mexican–American War; American Civil War: Peninsula Campaign
- Other work: banker, U.S. marshal, Mississippi state treasurer

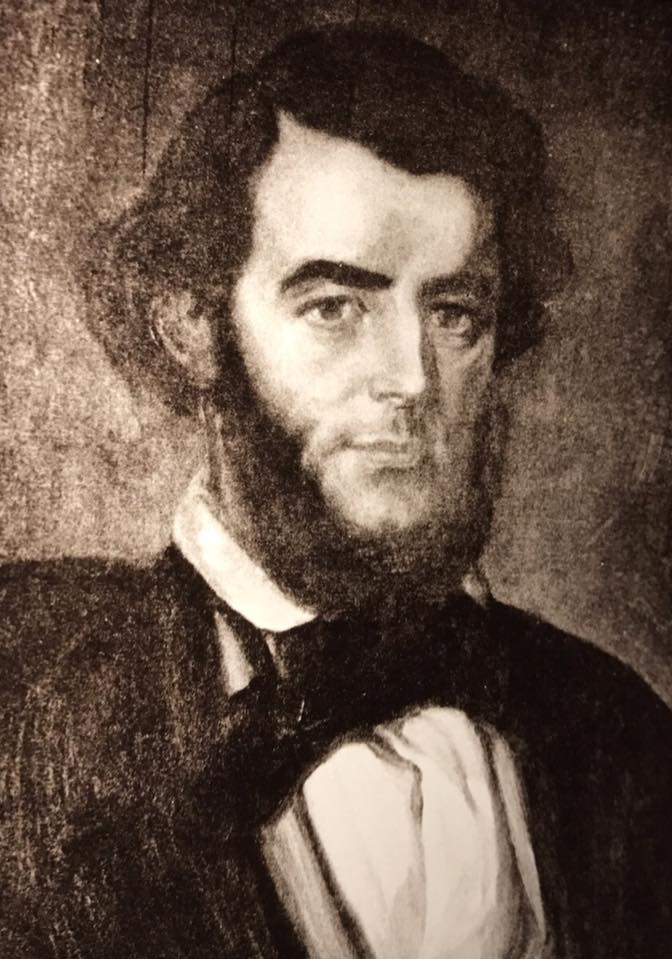

Richard Griffith (January 11, 1814 – June 29, 1862) was a brigadier general in the Confederate States Army during the American Civil War. He was mortally wounded at the Battle of Savage's Station during the 1862 Peninsula Campaign. He was one of a number of Confederate generals who were born in the North in Pennsylvania.

== Early life and career ==
Richard Griffith was born near Philadelphia, Pennsylvania on January 11, 1814 to Richard and Ann Griffith.

After graduating from Ohio University in Athens, Ohio, Griffith moved to Vicksburg, Mississippi, in about 1840. During the Mexican–American War, he served as an infantryman with the 1st Regiment of Mississippi Rifles, where he met and became friends with Colonel Jefferson Davis.

After the Mexican-American War, he returned to civilian life and made his living as a banker and a U.S. Marshal. He was active in state and local politics, and was elected as the State Treasurer of Mississippi in 1847. He was a member of the antebellum Mississippi Militia.

His wife was Sallie Ann Whitfield, and they had four children, including Benjamin Whitfield Griffith who was mayor of Vicksburg, MS, 1905–1909.

== Civil War service ==
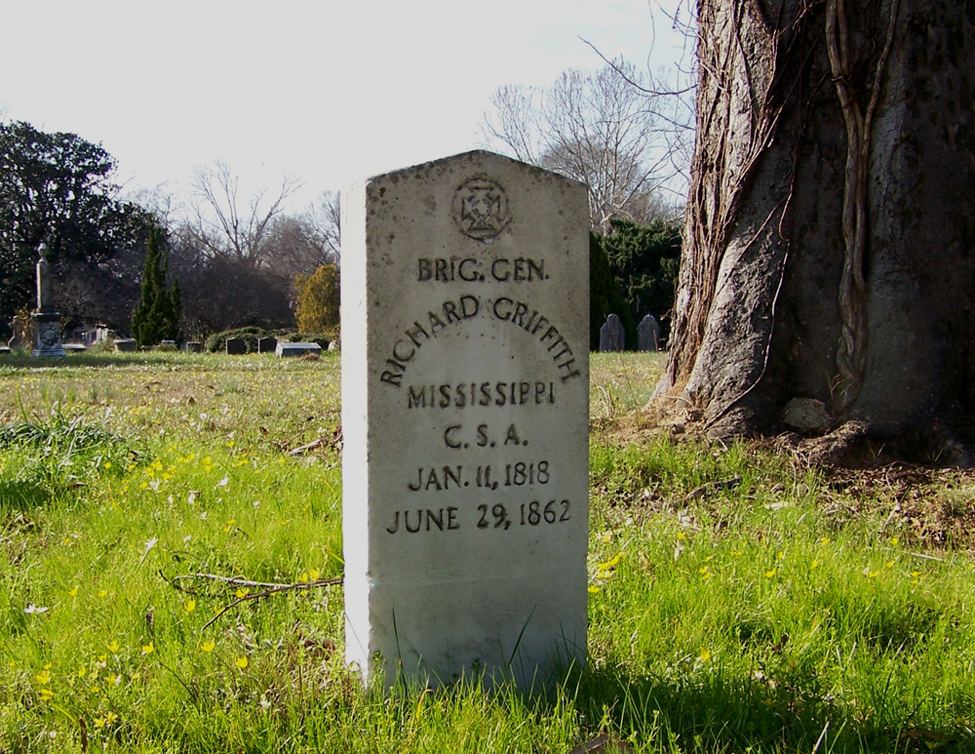
The burial site of Gen. Richard Griffith in Greenwood Cemetery in Jackson, Mississippi.

When the Civil War began, Griffith was appointed colonel of the 12th Mississippi Infantry Regiment in May 1861. He was promoted to brigadier general on November 2 and put in command of a brigade of four Mississippi regiments that became part of Maj. Gen. John B. Magruder's division in April 1862.

He soon saw action in the Seven Days Battles near Richmond, Virginia. It was during this fighting that General Griffith was mortally wounded. On June 29, 1862, Griffith and his men were pursuing Union soldiers retreating from positions on the Nine Mile Road when they encountered elements of Maj. Gen. Edwin V. Sumner's II Corps near Savage's Station, who were guarding the Union forces' retreat. In heavy artillery fire, Griffith was wounded in his thigh by a shell fragment.

When he was informed that he was fatally wounded, it is reported that General Griffith said, "If only I could have led my brigade through this battle, I would have died satisfied." Griffith was taken to Richmond, but succumbed to his wounds the same day. He is buried in Greenwood Cemetery in Jackson, Mississippi.

== Legacy ==
The loss of General Griffith was much lamented by many, including his long-time friend Jefferson Davis. Of the fighting at Savage's Station he wrote, "Our loss was small in numbers, but great in value. Among others who could ill be spared, here fell the gallant soldier, the useful citizen, the true friend and Christian gentleman, Brigadier General Richard Griffith. He had served with distinction in foreign war, and, when the South was invaded, was among the first to take up arms in defense of our rights."

Later in the war, a group of soldier-musicians called "The McLaws Minstrels," serving under Lafayette McLaws and formerly under General Griffith, would play at a theater in Fredericksburg. They charged a modest admission fee, the proceeds from which were used to erect a monument in the Mississippi State Capitol in honor of their fallen commander.

His portrait hangs in Beauvoir, the Jefferson Davis Home and Presidential Library, and a copy in the Mississippi Hall of Fame in the Old Capitol Museum. Three blocks from the museum, East and West Griffith Streets are named after him.

== See also ==
- List of American Civil War generals (Confederate)

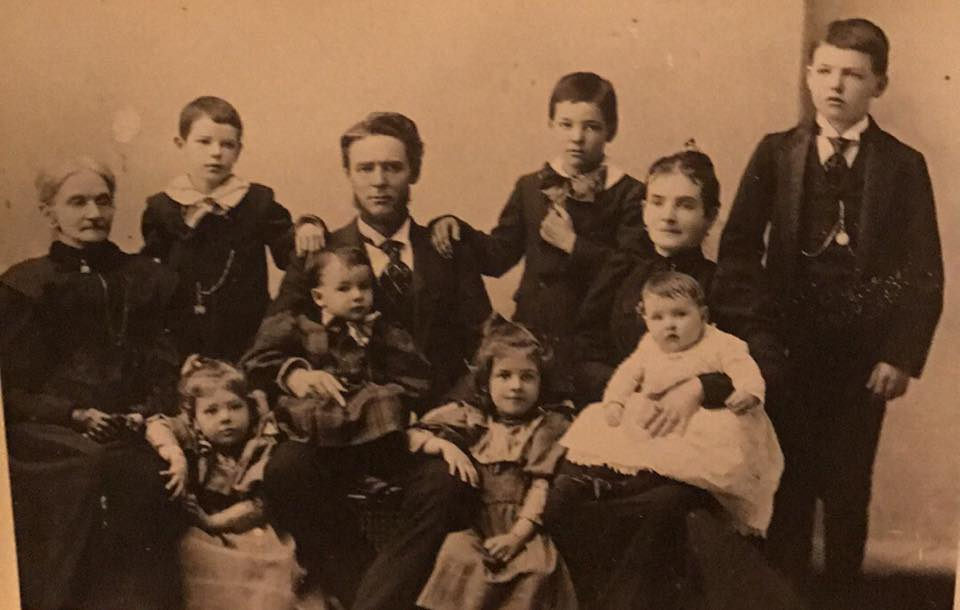
Griffith's widow, Sallie Ann Whitfield, their son Benjamin (mayor of Vicksburg), his wife Cora and their seven children.

== Notes ==
Political offices
Preceded by William Clark	Treasurer of Mississippi; 1847–1851	Succeeded by William Clark
