= Old Mississippi State Capitol =

- Old State Capitol
- U.S. National Register of Historic Places
- U.S. National Historic Landmark
- Mississippi Landmark
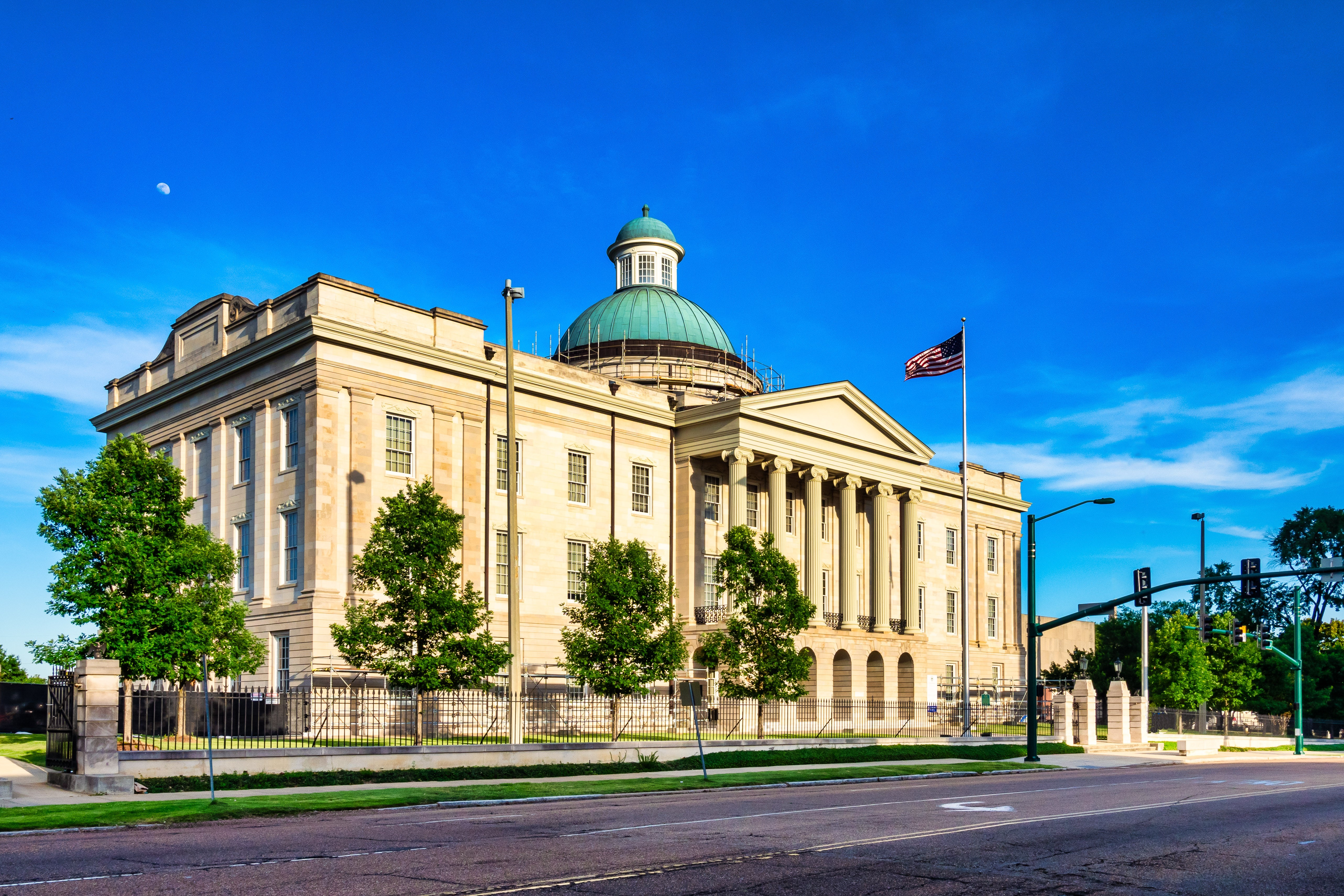
- Old State Capitol in 2019

- Location within Mississippi Location within the United States
- Location: 100 N. State St., Jackson, Mississippi
- Coordinates: 32°17′57″N 90°10′48″W
- Built: 1839
- Architect: William Nichols
- Architectural style: Greek Revival
- NRHP reference No.: 69000087
- USMS No.: 049-JAC-0002-NHL-ML

Significant dates
- Added to NRHP: November 25, 1969
- Designated NHL: December 14, 1990
- Designated USMS: July 14, 1986

The Old Mississippi State Capitol, also known as Old Capitol Museum or Old State Capitol, served as the Mississippi statehouse from 1839 until 1903. The old state capitol was added to the National Register of Historic Places in 1969. In 1986, the structure was designated a Mississippi Landmark and became a National Historic Landmark in 1990.

== History ==
=== Construction ===
Although construction was initiated in 1833, there were problems with the architect and substandard materials. The original architect, John Lawrence, was replaced in 1836 by William Nichols, who oversaw completion of the 3-story structure in 1840.

The exterior of the building was composed of brick, limestone, and stucco. A copper rotunda dome extended 94 feet (29 m) above the first floor. Wood was the principal material used for construction of the building's interior, with the exception of brick partition walls and flagstones on the rotunda floor.

=== Occupancy ===
From 1839 until 1903, as Mississippi's statehouse, the old capitol was the site of several historical legislative events:

- Passage of the Married Women's Property Act, the first law in any state to allow married women to independently own property, in 1839.
- Passage of an ordinance of secession in 1861.
- Constitutional Convention of 1865.
- Constitutional Convention of 1868, recognizing African American political rights.
- Restoration of white rule in 1875.
- Constitutional Convention of 1890, under which Mississippi is still governed.

When construction of a newer state capitol was completed in 1903, the old capitol building was abandoned and remained so until 1916, when it was renovated for state office space. By 1960, all state agencies had vacated the structure and it was again renovated to become the State Historical Museum in 1961.

In August 2005, winds from Hurricane Katrina peeled off sections of the old capitol's copper roof. About four weeks later, rain from Hurricane Rita infiltrated the building and damaged ceilings, walls, and ornamentation, as well as historical artifacts. Storm repairs and renovations were completed between 2007 and 2009, and the museum reopened to the public. The Old Capitol Museum is administered by the Mississippi Department of Archives and History.

== Gallery ==
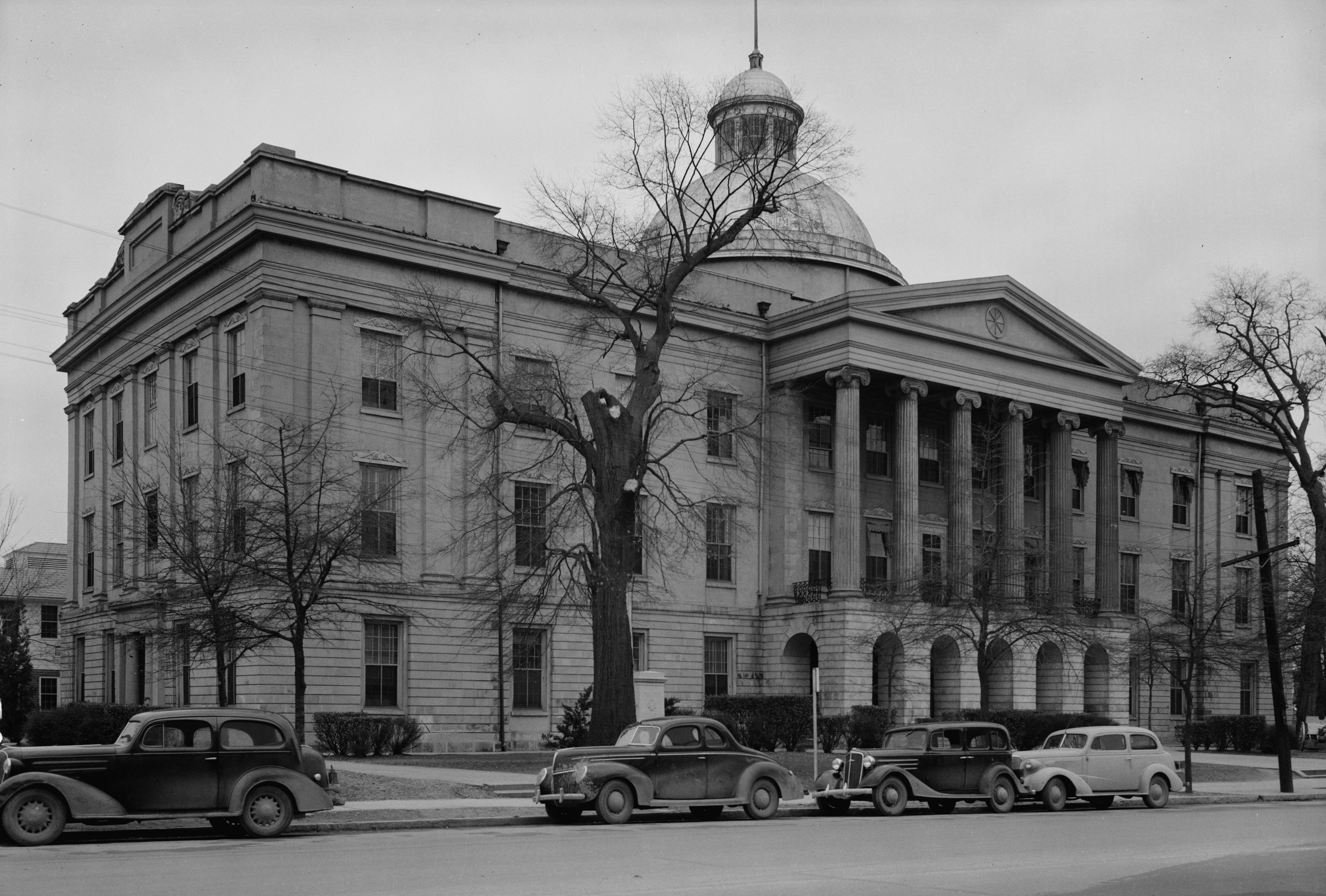
Old Mississippi State Capitol; February 20, 1940

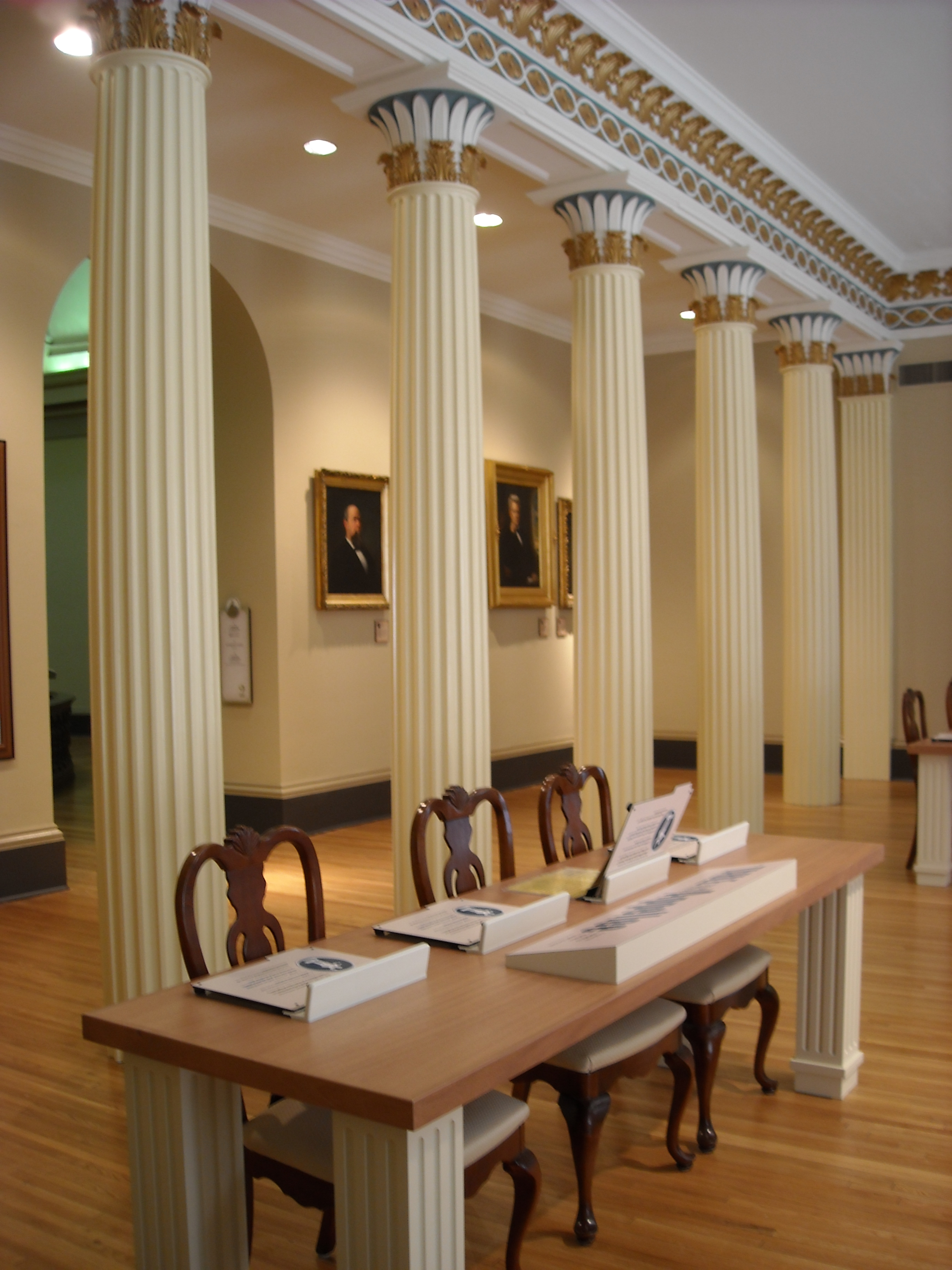
Supreme Court Chamber in the Old Mississippi Capitol building. Desk for counsel for the appellee.

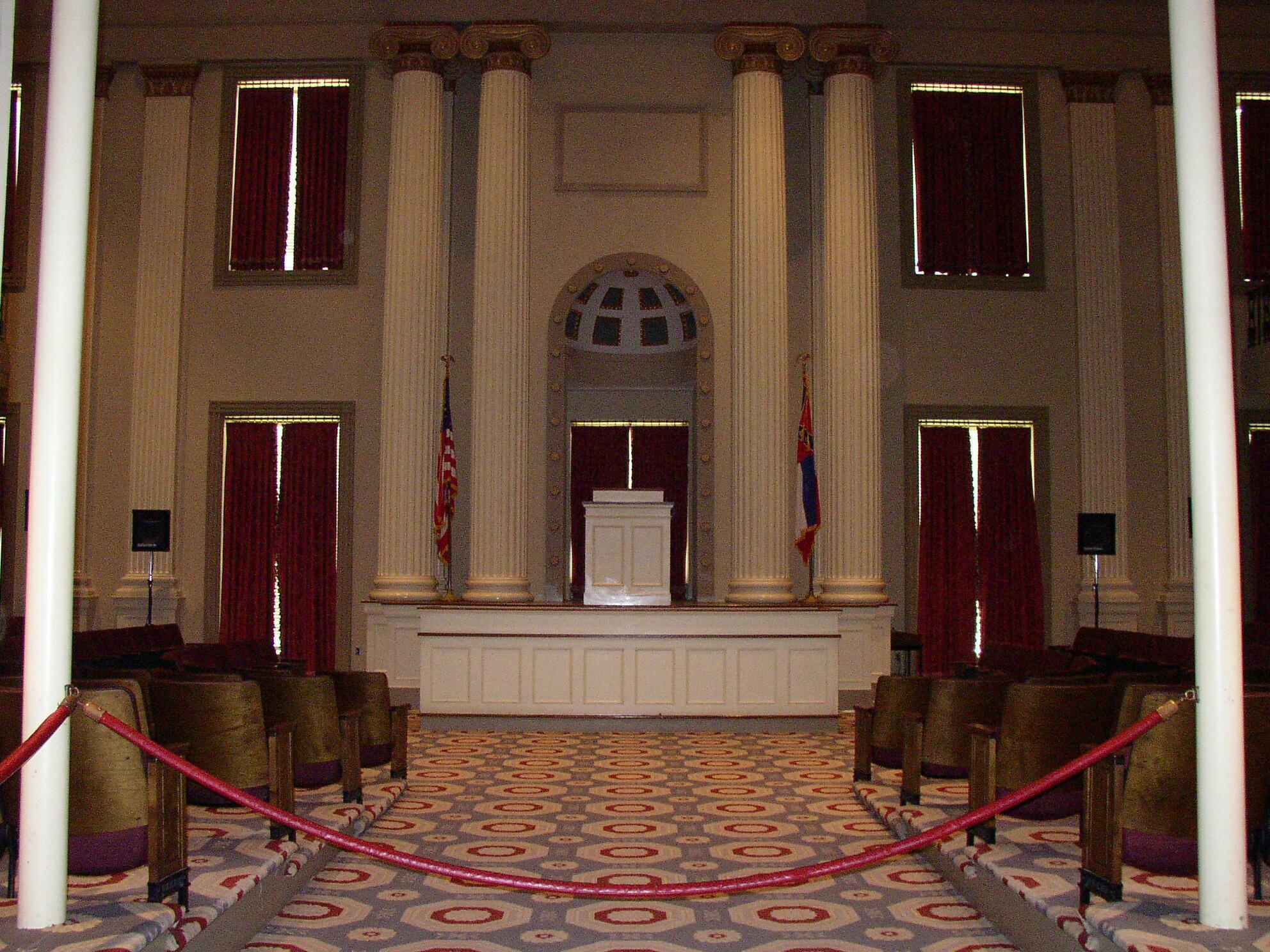
Old Mississippi State Capitol House of Representatives chamber.

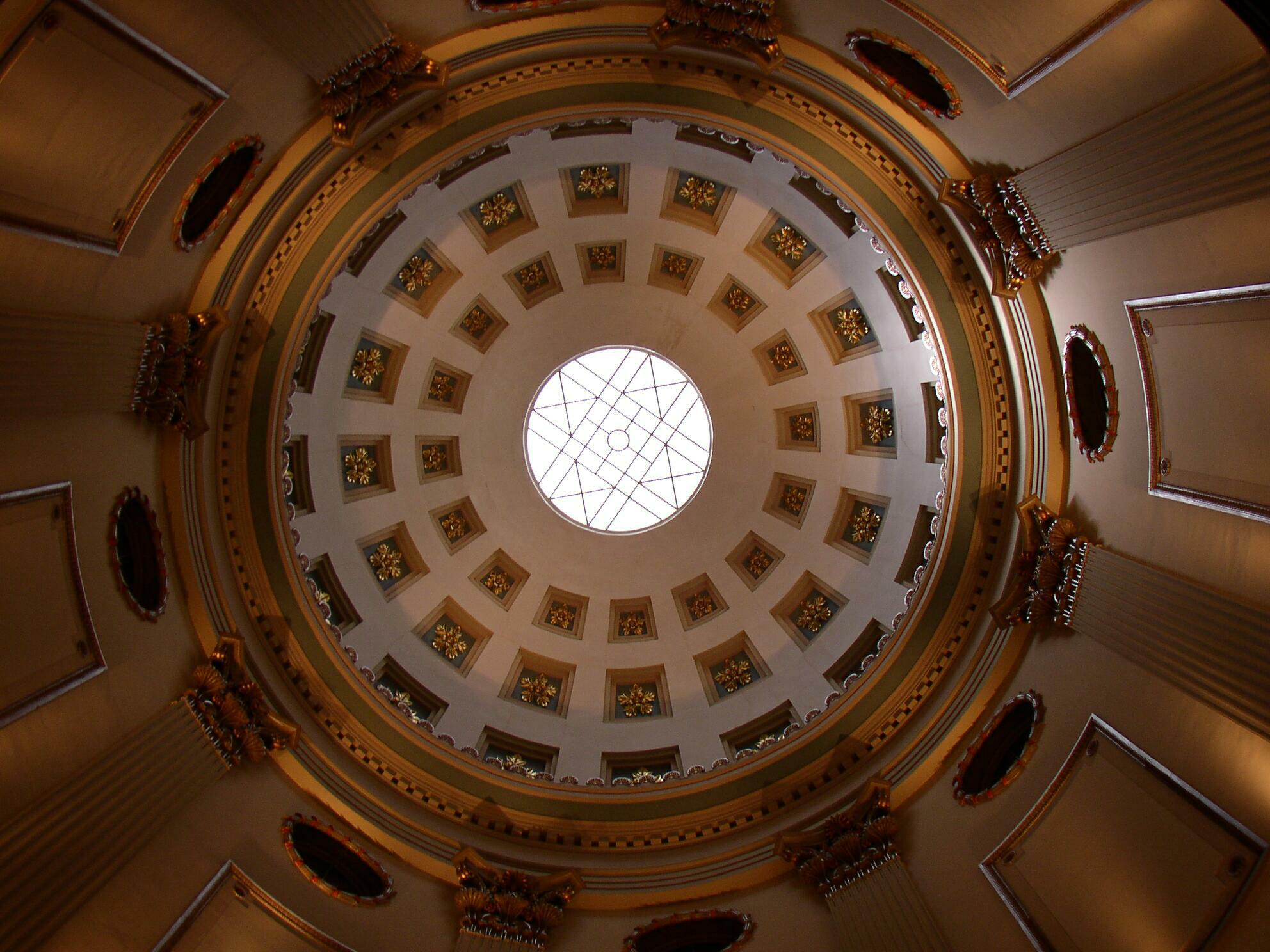
Old Mississippi State Capitol rotunda.

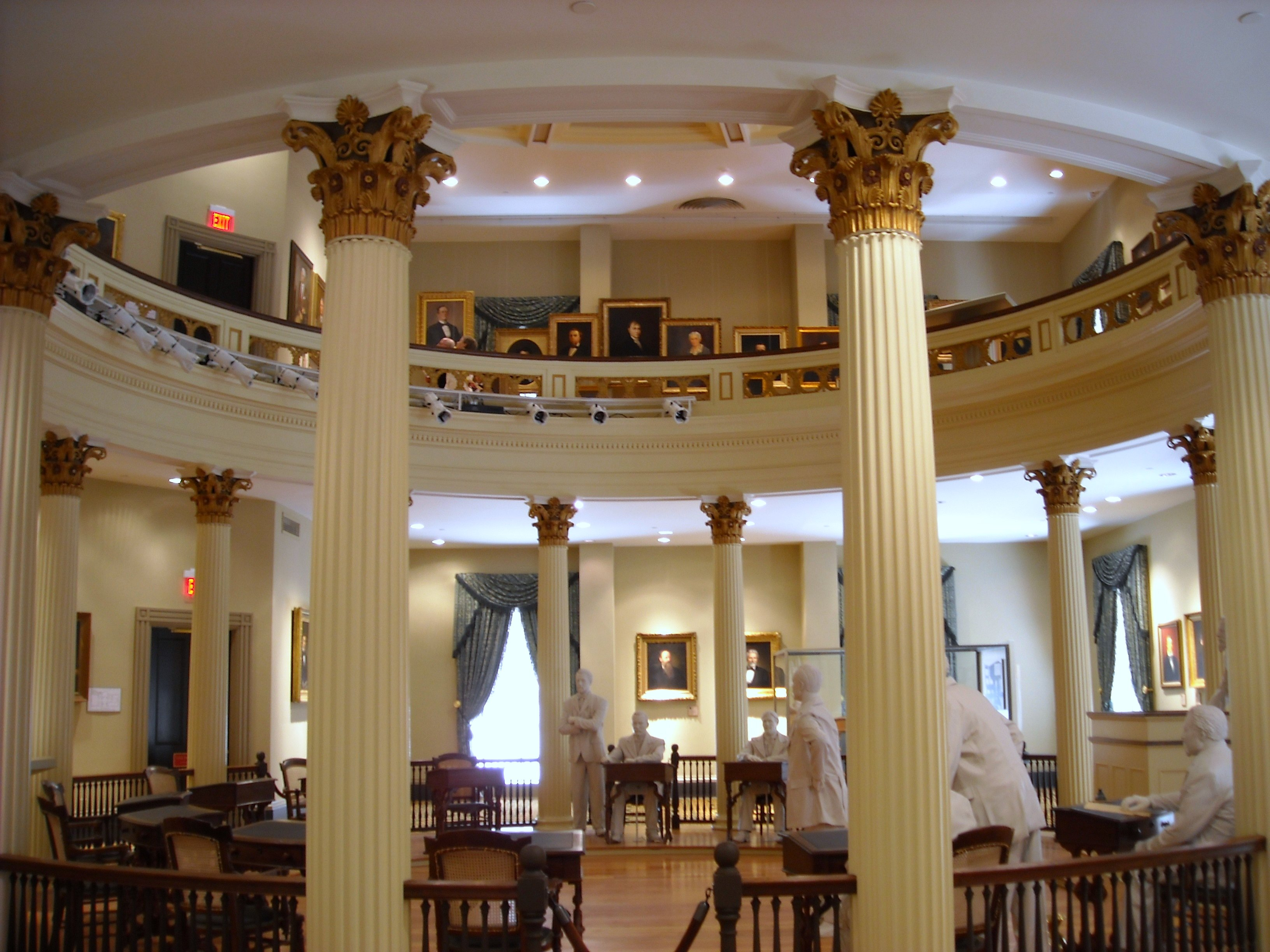
Old Mississippi State Capitol Senate Chamber

== See also ==
- List of National Historic Landmarks in Mississippi
- National Register of Historic Places listings in Hinds County, Mississippi
- Perry Cohea
