= Senator Doxey (disambiguation) =

Wall Doxey (1892–1962) was a U.S. Senator from Mississippi from 1941 to 1943. Senator Doxey may also refer to:

- Charles T. Doxey (1841–1898), Indiana State Senate
- Ralph H. Doxey (born 1950), Mississippi State Senate
