= 1941 United States Senate special election in Mississippi =

- September 29, 1941
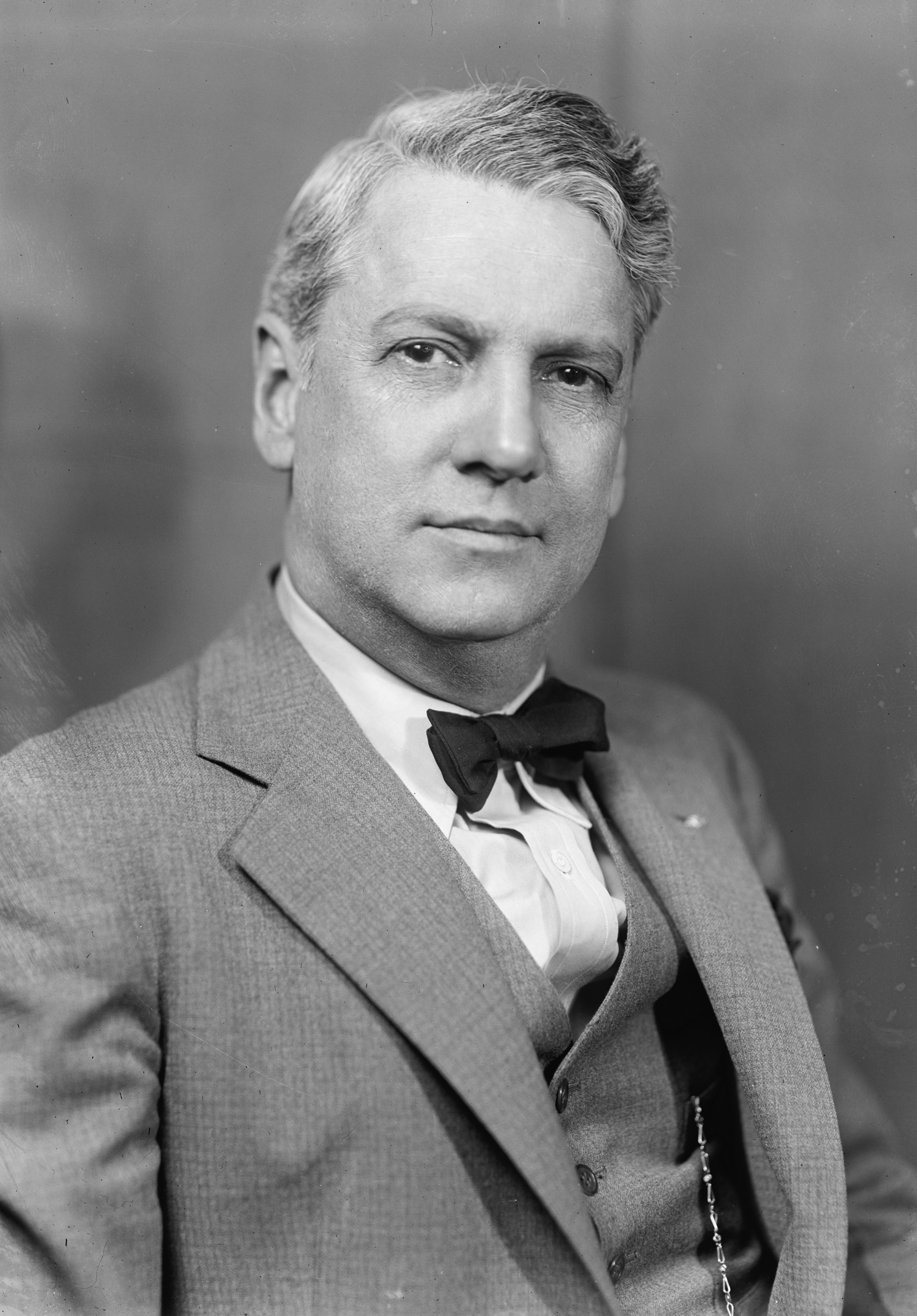

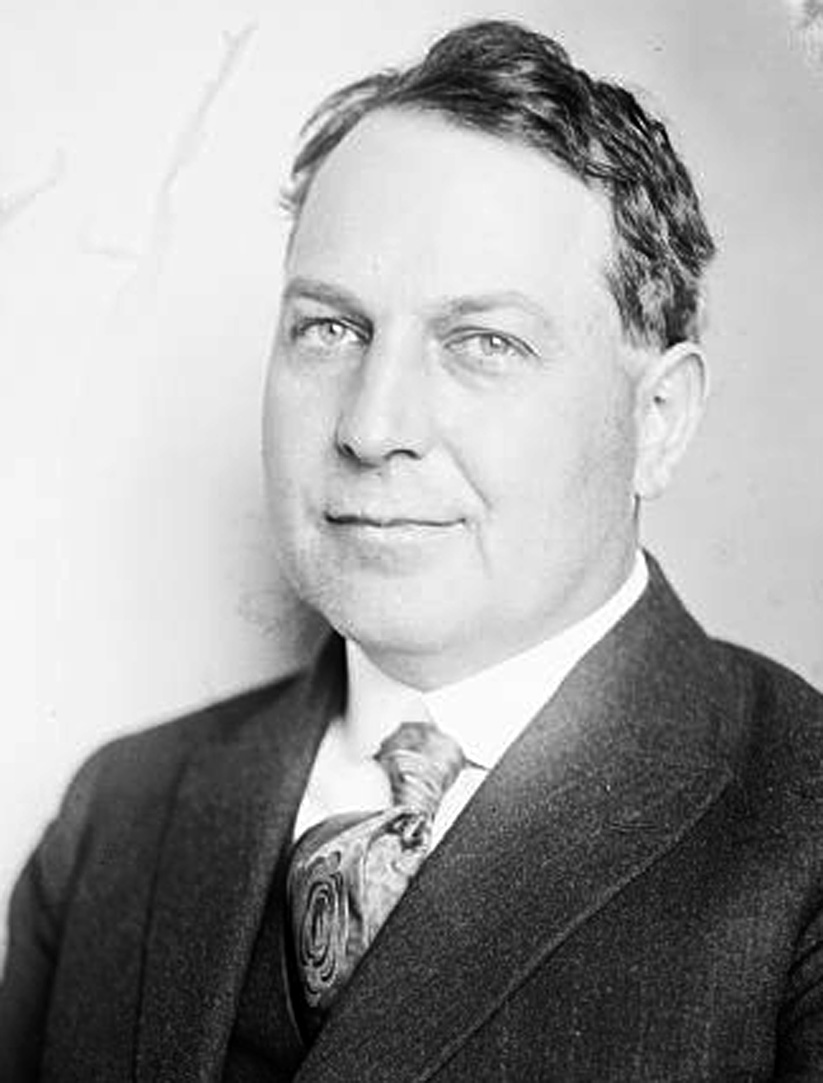
Party	Democratic	Democratic
Popular vote	59,556	58,738
Percentage	50.35%	49.65%
U.S. senator before election
Wall Doxey
Democratic
Elected U.S. Senator
James Eastland
Democratic

The 1941 United States Senate special election in Mississippi was held on September 29 to complete the unexpired term of Senator Pat Harrison. Interim Senator James Eastland did not run for a full term in office. In the election, U.S. Representative Wall Doxey narrowly defeated his House colleague Ross A. Collins.

== Background ==
Four-term Democratic senator Pat Harrison died June 22, 1941. Governor Paul B. Johnson Sr. appointed Democratic planter and former state representative James Eastland on June 30 to fill the vacant seat until a successor could be duly elected. Eastland was appointed after his father, Woods Eastland, declined and on the condition that he would not run in the special election to complete the term.

== Candidates ==
- Ross A. Collins, U.S. Representative from Meridian and candidate for Senate in 1934
- Wall Doxey, U.S. Representative from Holly Springs

== Results ==
1941 U.S. Senate special election in Mississippi
Party	Candidate	Votes	%
Democratic	Wall Doxey	59,556	50.35%
Democratic	Ross A. Collins	58,738	49.65%
Total votes		118,394	100.00%

== Aftermath ==
In the 1942 election for a full term, James Eastland ran and defeated both Doxey and Collins.
