= Bert J. Barnett =

American politician (1884–1949)

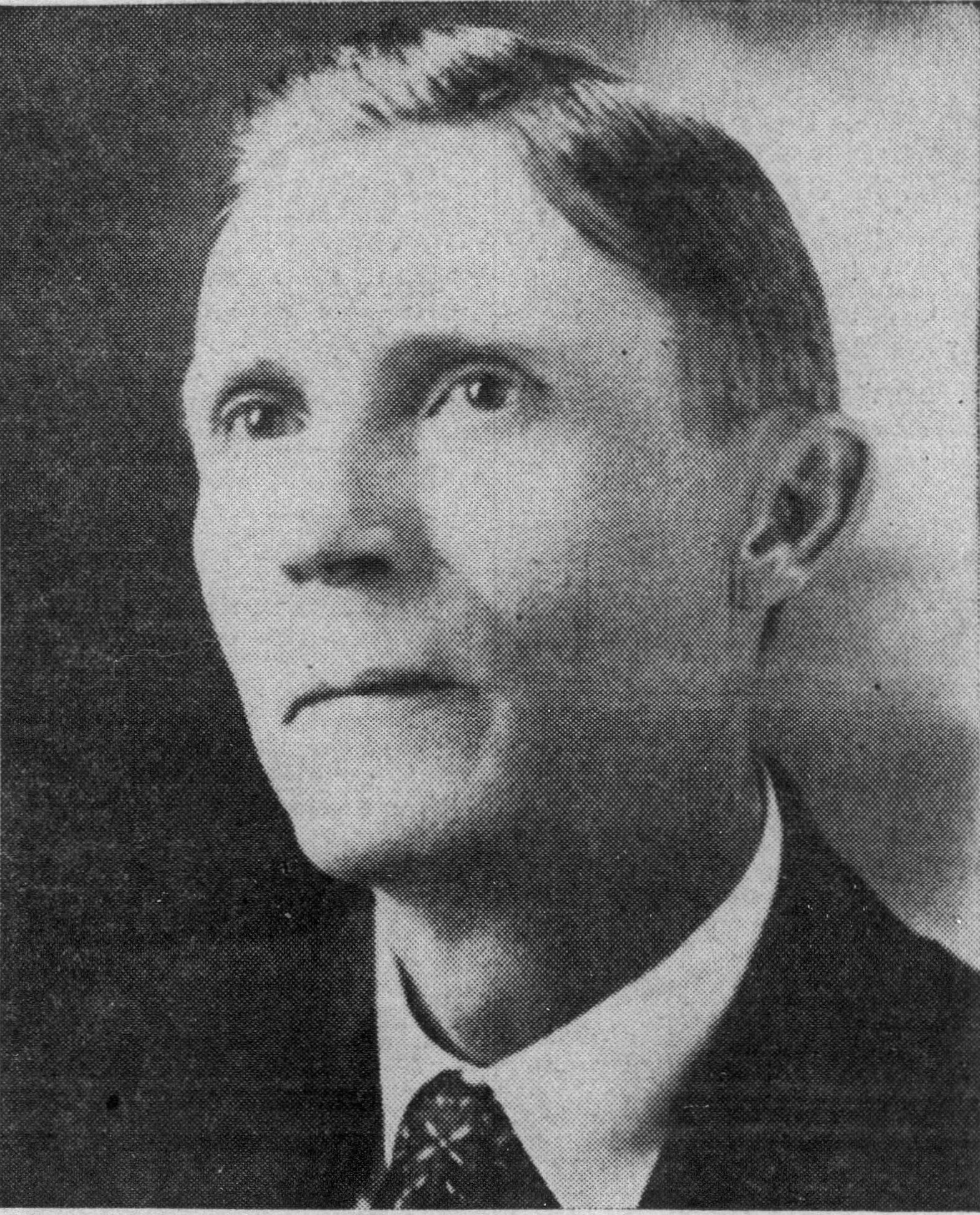
- 1939

31st State Auditor of Mississippi
- In office January 1944 – January 1948
- Governor: Thomas L. Bailey; Fielding L. Wright
- Preceded by: J. M. Causey
- Succeeded by: Carl Craig

Member of the Mississippi State Senate from the 17th district
- In office January 1936 – January 1940

Personal details
- Born: April 30, 1884 Standing Pine, Mississippi, U.S.
- Died: March 17, 1949 (aged 64) New Orleans, Louisiana, U.S.
- Party: Democratic
- Relations: Ross Barnett (brother)
- Children: 1

Bert Jefferson Barnett (April 30, 1884 – March 17, 1949) was an American politician. He was the 31st State Auditor of Mississippi from 1944 to 1948 and represented Leake County for a term in the Mississippi State Senate.

== Early life ==
Bert Jefferson Barnett was born on April 30, 1884, in Standing Pine, Mississippi. He was the son of Confederate veteran John William Bennett and his wife Virginia "Jennie" Chadwick (died 1933). His siblings included future Governor Ross Barnett (1898-1987), Horace Chadwick Barnett (c. 1882 - 1937), John W. Barnett (June 1, 1893 - June 17, 1971), Dr. F. J. Barnett (c. 1874 - 1935), Mary Barnett, Nell Barnett Brown, and Ruth Barnett Phillips. Barnett attended the public schools of Leake County. He then attended Western Kentucky State Normal College and then Mississippi Normal College.

== Career ==
He worked as a teacher in Central Mississippi. This included a stint as superintendent of the Agricultural High School in Leake County. In 1927, Barnett was elected chancery clerk of Leake County and served a term from 1928 to 1932. In August 1931, he ran for re-election against George Chadwick and two other candidates, and had to face Chadwick in a runoff election. He was re-elected and served a second term from 1932 to 1936.

In February 1935, he announced his candidacy to represent the 17th District (Leake & Neshoba Counties) in the Mississippi State Senate for the 1936–1940 term. He was elected over two opponents in the first Democratic primary. In the primary results, Barnett received 6100 votes, while W. A. Ellis received 2048 votes and Dr. O. C. Ingram received 3053 votes. During that term, he was chairman of the Pensions Committee, vice chairman of both the Constitution and County Affairs Committees, and also served on the following committees: Agriculture, Commerce & Manufacturing; Fees & Salaries; and Roads, Ferries & Bridges. In March 1937, Barnett was injured while inspecting timber near Lena, and was subsequently hospitalized.

In March 1938, Barnett announced his campaign for the office of State Auditor of Mississippi for the 1940–1944 term. The campaign was formally announced on January 1, 1939. In August 1939, shortly before the first Democratic primary, a rally was held for him by citizens of Carthage in his home county. In the first primary on August 8, Barnett got the second-most votes out of four candidates. During the runoff primary on August 29, Barnett was the sole opponent of top vote getter, Field Auditor James M. Causey; Barnett lost the runoff with 134,650 votes compared to Causey's 153,580 votes. From 1940 to 1943, Barnett served as auditor and business manager of the Mississippi State Hospital.

In March 1943, Barnett announced his candidacy for auditor for the 1944–1948 term. Barnett ran unopposed in the primary and in the November 2 general election. He was inaugurated in January 1944. On January 23, 1944, Barnett announced the names of his staff, including Deputy Auditor J. S. McIlwain. His term ended in 1948.

On January 1, 1949, Governor Fielding Wright appointed Barnett to be business manager of the State Charity Hospital in Jackson. He died in the Foundation Hospital at New Orleans on the morning of March 17, 1949.

== Personal life ==
Barnett was a member of the Baptist Church. He was also a member of the Woodmen of the World and the Rotarians. He was married to Joyce Ellis (c. 1886 - 1959) and they had one daughter, Marjorie (September 12, 1919 - February 3, 1999). Marjorie married Champion Merle Wilbourn in 1941 and they had a daughter. She later married James Harold Roberts in 1956 and Lindsey M. Hoover in 1967.
