= Paul B. Johnson State Park =

State park in Mississippi, United States

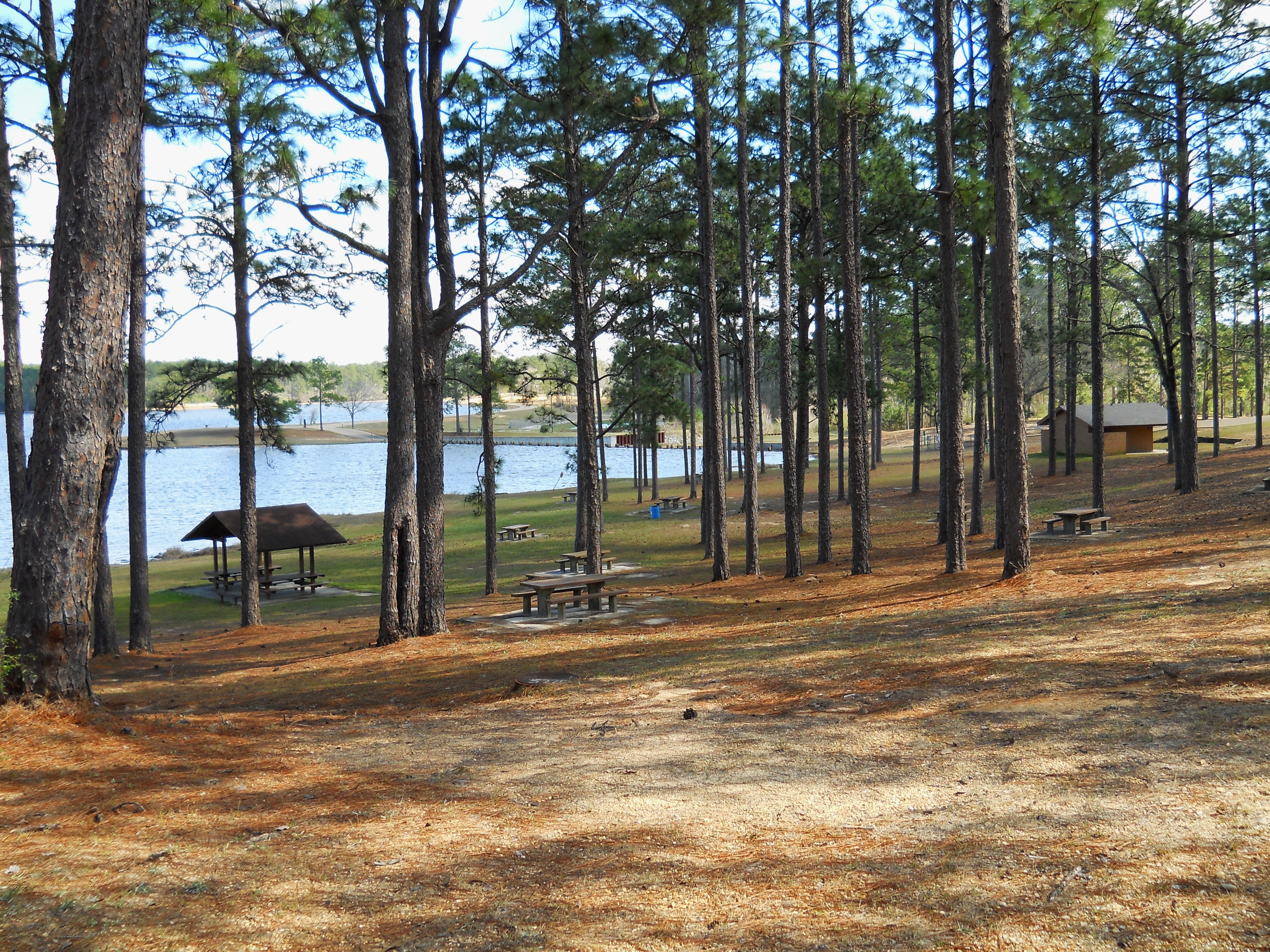
- Picnic area at Geiger Lake

- Location within Mississippi
- Location: McLaurin, Mississippi, United States
- Coordinates: 31°08′29″N 89°14′14″W
- Area: 805 acres (326 ha)
- Elevation: 220 ft (67 m)
- Administrator: Mississippi Department of Wildlife, Fisheries, and Parks
- Designation: Mississippi state park
- Named for: Governor Paul B. Johnson
- Website: Official website

Paul B. Johnson State Park is a public recreation area on the shores of Geiger Lake, located off U.S. Highway 49 in McLaurin, Mississippi, 12 miles (19 km) south of Hattiesburg. The state park is named after Paul B. Johnson, the forty-sixth governor of Mississippi.

== Description ==
The park is situated on rolling hills that contain flowering dogwoods, southern yellow pines, and oaks. Geiger Lake, once known as Lake Shelby, was constructed during the mid-1940s using German prisoner of war labor by POWs housed at Camp Shelby.

== Activities and amenities ==
The 225-acre (91-ha) lake offers fishing, water skiing, and swimming. The lake is stocked with largemouth bass, bluegill, shellcracker, crappie, and channel catfish. The park features 25 primitive tent-camping areas, 125 RV camping pads with water, sewer and electrical hookups, and 16 vacation cabins. The park also offers picnic sites with grills, picnic pavilions, playground equipment, and a splash pad.
