= Governor Bailey =

Governor Bailey may refer to:

- Carl E. Bailey (1894–1948), 31st Governor of Arkansas
- Thomas L. Bailey (1888–1946), 48th Governor of Mississippi
- Willis J. Bailey (1854–1932), 16th Governor of Kansas
