= Carl Craig (politician) =

American politician (1878–1957)

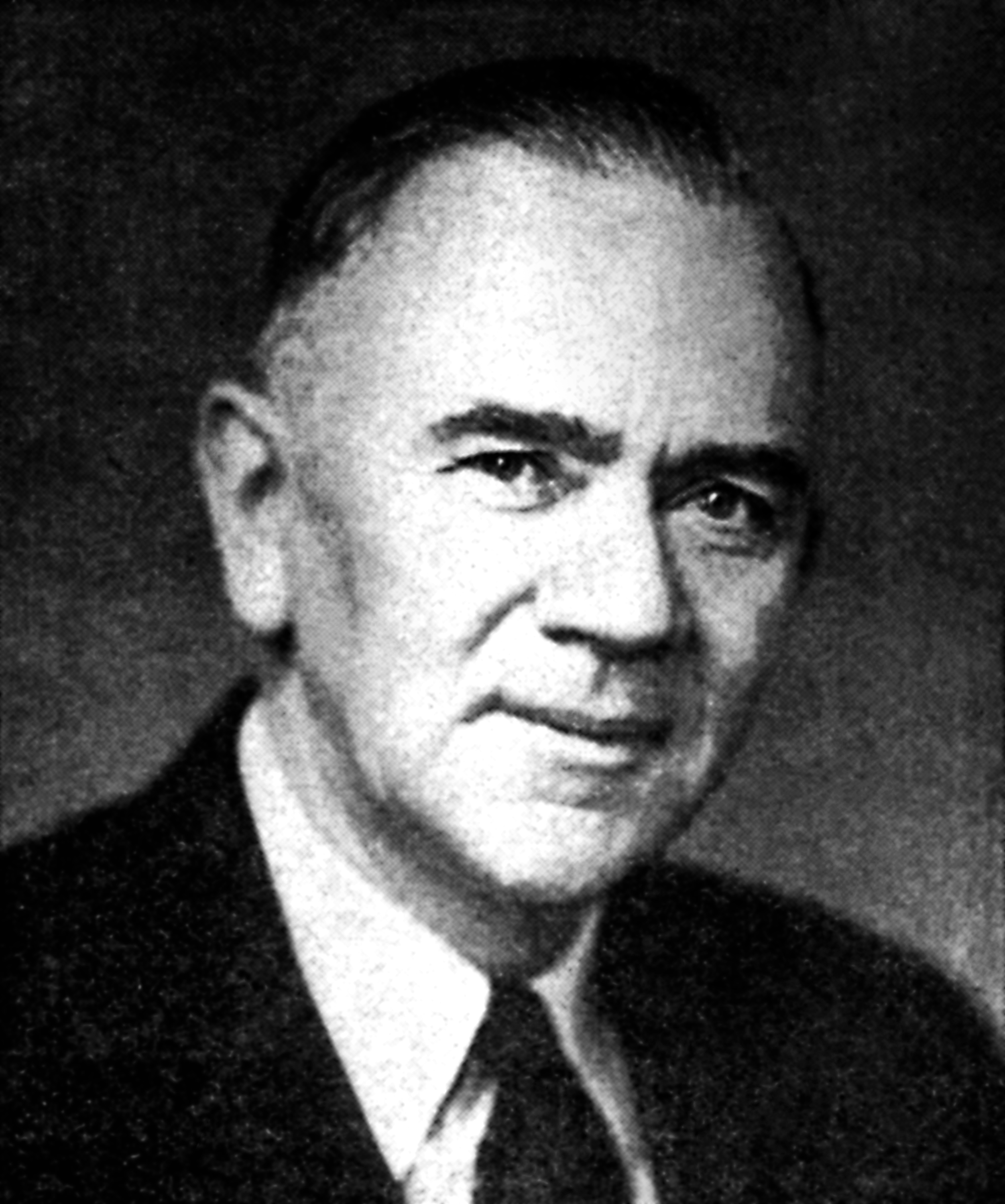

29th and 32nd State Auditor of Mississippi
- In office January 19, 1948 – January 21, 1952
- Governor: Fielding L. Wright
- Preceded by: Bert Barnett
- Succeeded by: William Neal
- In office January 20, 1936 – January 15, 1940
- Governor: Hugh L. White
- Preceded by: Joe S. Price
- Succeeded by: J. M. Causey

Mississippi State Tax Collector
- In office January 15, 1940 – January 19, 1948
- Governor: Paul B. Johnson Sr.; Dennis Murphree; Thomas L. Bailey; Fielding L. Wright
- Preceded by: James B. Gully
- Succeeded by: Nellah Massey Bailey

Personal details
- Born: Carl Norris Craig; July 7, 1878
- Died: December 4, 1957 (aged 79)
- Party: Democratic

Carl Norris Craig (July 7, 1878 – December 4, 1957) was an American politician who served as the state auditor of Mississippi from 1936 to 1940 and from 1948 to 1952. He also served as the Mississippi state tax collector from 1940 to 1948. As state auditor, he oversaw a widely publicized audit of the Mississippi land commission office, eventually finding that the state land commissioner had misappropriated $27,000 in state funds. His first term as state tax collector largely centered around an unsuccessful series of lawsuits against four road construction companies as well as individual highway contractors, while his second term as state tax collector was focused almost entirely on enforcement of the newly passed "black market tax" on illegal liquor.

== Early life, education, and early career ==
Carl Norris Craig was born on July 7, 1878, in Abbeville, Mississippi. He was orphaned at a young age, and attended public schools in Lafayette County as well as Iuka Normal School. After graduating from college, he was a high school teacher for seven years in northern Mississippi schools, before starting a wholesale grocery business. He was married to Lucy Hinton, and they had six children.

== Political career ==
=== 1935 state auditor election ===
Craig announced his intention to run for state auditor on December 10, 1934. The incumbent state auditor, Joe Price, was ineligible to run for a consecutive term. Other candidates in the Democratic primary included former state auditor Carl C. White and circuit clerk Grover C. Ballard. In April 1935, Craig selected Allan McCluer, a World War I veteran who successfully managed Dan R. McGehee's campaign for U.S. Congress, to be his campaign manager, and opened his campaign headquarters in Jackson.

A controversy emerged in May 1935 after Price dismissed Ralph Buckingham, a bookkeeper in the state auditor's office, citing "disloyalty". Buckingham, who was hired during White's term as state auditor in 1928, alleged that he was fired for supporting White's campaign, while Price was a supporter of Craig; Price and White declined to comment on the statement at the time. Buckingham and other former employees later continued the allegations, writing that Price "has already fired two people for supporting Mr. White in his present race for auditor".

In the Democratic primary election, which was held on August 6, 1935, Craig received 34.1 percent of the vote, finishing second behind White, who received 44.5 percent of the vote. Because no candidate received a majority of the vote, the race went to a runoff between White and Craig on August 27. Ballard, who was eliminated in the primary, endorsed White for state auditor on August 14. Craig won the runoff election with 55.5 percent of the vote, receiving almost 40,000 more votes than White. Craig's surprise victory, which was the largest majority of the statewide runoff elections that year, was described in newspapers as "the biggest upset in the election" and "one of the most remarkable races of the present campaign". Craig was unopposed in the general election, and was sworn in as state auditor on January 20, 1936.

=== State auditor (1936–1940) ===
Craig appointed R. H. Steele, a former assistant secretary of a state commission on psychiatric hospitals, as the deputy state auditor in February 1936. He provided testimony to the Mississippi State Senate as part of an investigation of gasoline tax refunds by the office of the previous state auditor, Carl C. White. On October 8, 1936, Governor Hugh L. White accepted a recommendation from Craig, state treasurer Newton James, and state tax commission chairman Alfred Stone to double the property tax rate from four mills to eight mills. The move was met with backlash from Mississippi taxpayers, and Craig later recommended reducing the tax rate back to four mills after reporting a state surplus in July 1937.

A committee of the Mississippi House of Representatives requested in January 1937 that Craig conduct an audit of the records of state land commissioner R. D. Moore. Despite initially protesting that the auditor's office did not have the capacity to do so, Craig initiated the audit and it was reported in February 1937 that the audit was triggered by a significant increase in land patents being issued during the previous year. Craig's office contacted 10,000 people who had received land patents in recent years, seeking information on the amount paid for each patent. An initial report was delivered to the House committee on May 31, and state land office employees were summoned before a grand jury two days later, due to alleged violations found by the audit. The audit, which was completed in September 1937, found a shortage of approximately $27,000 and alleged that Moore misappropriated state funds; At the direction of state attorney general Greek Rice, Craig formally demanded payment of the shortage from Moore. After a series of legal technicalities, Moore paid $15,000 of the balance to Craig, alleging that Craig had earlier refused to accept the payment at the request of state legislators.

In May 1937, with the governor's approval, Craig directed signs to be placed at all highway entry points into the state to notify truckers that Mississippi-specific tags or permits would be required to use the highways or pay a fine. The issue of commercial truck permits in Mississippi led to a public rift later that month, in which Time published opposing letters from White and Craig, who defended the arrest of a trucker who failed to purchase a permit, and lieutenant governor Jacob Buehler Snider, who slammed the fines and simultaneously announced his candidacy for governor in 1939. In response to criticism of the fine from adjoining states, Craig invited highway transportation officials from Alabama, Arkansas, Louisiana, and Tennessee to a conference to discuss a reciprocal agreement. The conference took place on July 15, 1937, with representatives from Alabama, Arkansas, and Tennessee, and an agreement was reached by July 21; Craig did not reach consensus with the Louisiana representatives. Five days later, Craig announced that the state of Georgia had joined the agreement. In April 1939, he rescinded the fine for out-of-state trucks carrying perishable produce from Mississippi, a move that was strongly opposed by railroad organizations, who argued that rail lines did not need the transportation assistance from trucks.

At the 1937 convention of the National Association of State Auditors, Comptrollers, and Treasurers, Craig successfully lobbied for the 1938 convention to be held in Biloxi, Mississippi; he served as the convention's host in November 1938. He was named by Governor White as a delegate representing Mississippi at the 1938 meeting of the National Tax Association. During his first term as auditor, Craig's office also conducted audits that alleged misconduct by the Harrison County Board of Supervisors and the Tallahatchie County Board of Supervisors.

==== 1939 state tax collector election ====
Craig was ineligible to run for a consecutive term as state auditor under the Mississippi constitution. He was mentioned as a potential candidate for governor of Mississippi as early as August 1938. In January 1939, it was reported that Craig was planning to run for the position of state tax collector. He formally announced his candidacy on March 3, challenging incumbent state tax collector James B. Gully, who had announced his intention to run for re-election. Craig officially qualified for the race under the state's Corrupt Practices Act on May 2. The race also included Mississippi Public Service Commission chairman Dillard W. Brown, who alleged that Craig and Gully were guilty of nepotism by giving jobs to each other's children. In the August 8 primary, Craig led with 46.1 percent of the vote, ahead of Gully's 28.9 percent and Brown's 25.1 percent; though no candidate received a majority of the total vote, a runoff election was avoided after both Gully and Brown dropped out of the race. Craig was unopposed in the general election, and was sworn in as state tax collector on January 15, 1940.

=== State tax collector (1940–1948) ===
==== First term ====
In June 1940, Craig sued hundreds of Mississippi contractors, alleging millions of dollars in unpaid taxes in preceding years. He was asked by state lawmakers on the House agricultural fact-finding committee to undertake an investigation of possible uncollected taxes, but refused the request, stating that he would not open a probe unless there was a guarantee of recovering back taxes. In August 1940, he spoke at a series of state house hearings, led by Speaker Sam Lumpkin, on potential reforms for reducing inequities in Mississippi's tax structure. During his first term, Craig also asked Mississippi lawmakers to pass legislation that would result in the entire state tax collector's office being paid on a "straight salary basis", rather than by commission.

Craig launched several lawsuits in 1940 seeking payments allegedly owed by four road construction companies and over 100 individual highway contractors. Craig subsequently ordered state auditor James B. Gully to stop issuing warrants to some of the contractors named in the suits, but the stop-order was quickly nullified by state attorney general Greek Rice, who argued that the courts had not yet ruled on the tax claims against the contractors. A circuit court judge ruled against Craig in December 1940, finding that he lacked the authority to initiate the proceedings and that any lawsuits should have been brought by the chairman of the state tax commission instead. The decision was overturned by another judge in February 1941, allowing the cases to proceed, though defendant company Dunn Construction immediately appealed the case to the Supreme Court of Mississippi, which ruled in May 1941 that Craig did not have the authority to bring the lawsuits.

==== 1943 state tax collector election ====
Craig's intention to run for a second term as state tax collector was reported by the McComb Daily Journal in January 1943. Tom L. Blissard, a former deputy state tax collector under Craig, entered the race on June 22, 1943. During his re-election campaign, Craig pointed to his record of collecting over $60,000 in taxes from New York banks, and emphasized that he received a flat salary, rather than a commission. He easily won re-election with 76.0 percent of the vote in the August 3 Democratic primary, receiving over 130,000 more votes than Blissard. Craig was unopposed in the general election, and was sworn in on January 17, 1944.

==== Second term ====
In March 1944, Governor Thomas L. Bailey signed into law the "black market bill", which authorized the state tax collector to collect a 10 percent tax on "black market" commodities including liquor, despite Mississippi officially being designated as a dry state at the time. The law went into effect on April 1, 1944, with Craig commenting that bootleggers would "realize that it is to their advantage to pay the tax". Ten percent of the taxes collected under this law was designated for expenses and salaries of the state tax collector's office. In his first report after the law went into effect, Craig reported that he had collected approximately $39,000 from 1,149 liquor dealers in the state, with a quarter of the dealers located in Harrison, Jackson, and Hancock counties. An August 1944 lawsuit filed by Craig against two liquor operations owned by N. A. Muse was the first to be brought for failing to comply with the 10 percent tax, although the lawsuit was formally filed under another law. It was settled when Muse, who had been charged by a grand jury for illegal possession of liquor, agreed to pay the taxes owed, plus state and county penalties. Craig credited the law with reducing the number of liquor dealers in the state by 40 percent, about six months after it went into effect, as well as a corresponding reduction in the volume of liquor shipped to Mississippi. In its first year, the tax on illegal liquor brought in $554,406, with about $55,000 of the collections going to Craig's office.

When some state legislators attempted to repeal the black market tax in January 1946, Craig rushed to deliver a report in an attempt to justify the tax. State senator William McGraw, the author of the repeal bill, disputed his claims and alleged that Craig was defending the tax for personal profit, saying: "I'd put out more figures than Carl does if a liquor bill was paying me $100,000 a year plus the $5,000 a year the state pays him." Craig's report was also harshly criticized by Mississippi State Bar Association president Earl L. Wingo, who called it "nothing more than cheap propaganda created in the hope of continuing this inconsistent, nefarious, and absurd law", and argued that the whiskey business had expanded, not declined, since the passage of the tax. Craig pushed back, claiming that Wingo was acting on behalf of bootleggers. The repeal efforts were unsuccessful at the 1946 General Assembly.

==== 1947 state auditor election ====
In October 1946, the Enterprise-Journal reported that Craig was planning to run for his old position as state auditor. He formally announced his campaign on February 15, 1947. E. J. Matranga, a foot specialist from Jackson, entered the race on May 31, 1947, with a tongue-in-cheek statement:

Our friend, Carl Craig, has been running for public office for so long and so often that I hear he has corns, callouses, and bunions all over his feet. He has collected so much black market tax that the added weight of his ten percent commission in his pockets has broken the muscle structure of his feet and legs and caused our friend to become bow legged. I want to help the people restore Carl's feet back to normal by permitting him to rest four years.

Craig easily defeated Matranga in the Democratic primary, winning 80.1 percent of the vote. He ran unopposed in the general election, and was sworn in as state auditor on January 19, 1948.

=== State auditor (1948–1952) ===
In April 1948, Craig was tasked with overseeing the distribution of $2.5 million from the state to each municipality based on population. He had a heart attack on December 22, 1948, a few days after undergoing an operation, and was confined to his home for several weeks. In October 1949, he was named chairman of a committee authorized to develop a new state employee retirement plan.

An amendment to the Constitution of Mississippi that would allow the state auditor to serve consecutive terms was on the 1950 ballot. Craig expressed support for the amendment before the election, though it received opposition from people who were concerned that the change would enable the state auditor to accumulate political power. The amendment ultimately failed by a margin of 8,838 votes. In February 1951, it was reported that Craig was considering running for governor, though he later said that "I don't have the money." He announced that he would not run for governor in April 1951, and did not run for any other offices that year.

== Other activities ==
Craig became a member of the board of directors of the Mississippi Children's Home Society (now Canopy Children's Solutions) in February 1937. He served as the president of the Mississippi Poultry Improvement Association in 1951.

== Death ==
Craig died on December 4, 1957, as the result of a stroke.

== Electoral history ==
Mississippi state auditor Democratic primary election, 1935
Party	Candidate	Votes	%
Democratic	Carl C. White	146,492	44.5
Democratic	Carl N. Craig	112,111	34.1
Democratic	Grover C. Ballard	70,521	21.4
Total votes		329,124	100.0

Mississippi state auditor Democratic primary runoff election, 1935
Party	Candidate	Votes	%
Democratic	Carl N. Craig	182,916	55.5
Democratic	Carl C. White	146,396	44.5
Total votes		329,312	100.0

Mississippi state tax collector Democratic primary election, 1939
Party	Candidate	Votes	%
Democratic	Carl N. Craig	133,007	46.1
Democratic	James B. Gully (incumbent)	83,371	28.9
Democratic	Dillard W. Brown	72,416	25.1
Total votes		288,794	100.0

Mississippi state tax collector Democratic primary election, 1943
Party	Candidate	Votes	%
Democratic	Carl N. Craig (incumbent)	202,072	76.0
Democratic	Tom L. Blissard	63,742	24.0
Total votes		265,814	100.0

Mississippi state auditor Democratic primary election, 1947
Party	Candidate	Votes	%
Democratic	Carl N. Craig	271,357	80.1
Democratic	E. J. Matranga	67,559	19.9
Total votes		338,916	100.0

Political offices
Preceded by Joe Price	State Auditor of Mississippi; 1936–1940	Succeeded by J. M. Causey
Preceded by James B. Gully	Mississippi State Tax Collector; 1940–1948	Succeeded by Nellah Massey Bailey
Preceded by Bert Barnett	State Auditor of Mississippi; 1948–1952	Succeeded by William Neal
