= 1943 Mississippi gubernatorial election =

1943 Mississippi Democratic gubernatorial primary election
- November 2, 1943
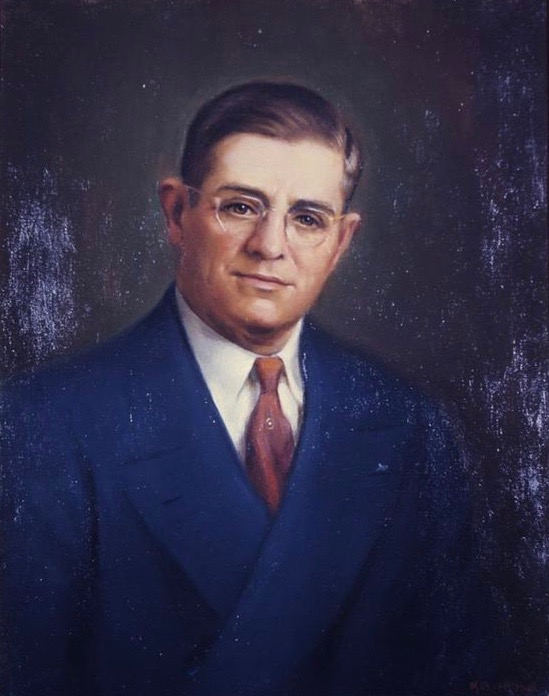

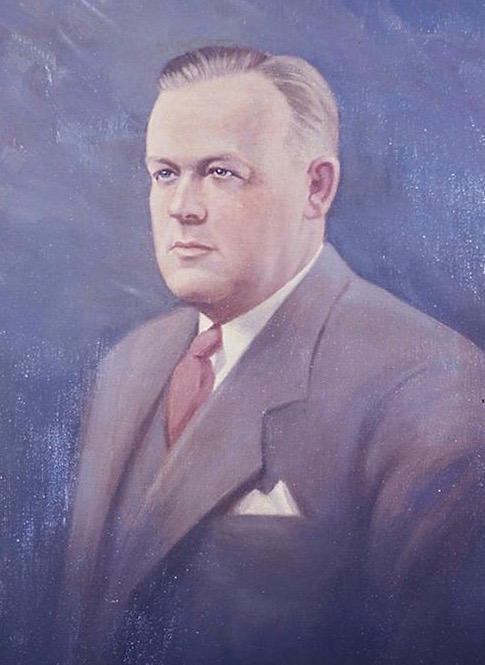
Nominee	Thomas L. Bailey	Martin S. Conner
Party	Democratic	Democratic
Popular vote	143,153	125,882
Percentage	53.21%	46.79%
- Bailey: 30–40% 40–50% 50–60% 60–70% 70–80% Conner: 30–40% 40–50% 50–60% 60–70% 70–80% Murphree: 30–40% 40–50% 70–80% Franklin: 30–40%
Governor before election
Paul B. Johnson Sr.
Democratic
Elected Governor
Thomas L. Bailey
Democratic

The 1943 Mississippi gubernatorial election took place on November 2, 1943, to elect the Governor of Mississippi. Incumbent Democrat Paul B. Johnson Sr. was term-limited, and could not run for reelection to a second term (he died less than two months after the election was held). As was common at the time, the Democratic candidate ran unopposed in the general election so therefore the Democratic primary was the real contest, and winning the primary was considered tantamount to election.

== Democratic primary ==
No candidate received a majority in the Democratic primary, which featured 4 contenders, so a runoff was held between the top two candidates. The runoff election was won by former state representative Thomas L. Bailey, who defeated former Governor Martin S. Conner.

=== Results ===
Mississippi Democratic gubernatorial primary, 1943
Party	Candidate	Votes	%
Democratic	Martin S. Conner	110,917	36.90
Democratic	Thomas L. Bailey	83,963	27.93
Democratic	Dennis Murphree	68,510	22.79
Democratic	Lester C. Franklin	37,240	12.39
Total votes		300,630	100.00

=== Runoff ===
Mississippi Democratic gubernatorial primary runoff, 1943
Party	Candidate	Votes	%
Democratic	Thomas L. Bailey	143,153	53.21
Democratic	Martin S. Conner	125,882	46.79
Total votes		269,035	100.00

== General election ==
In the general election, Bailey ran unopposed.

=== Results ===
Mississippi gubernatorial election, 1943
Party	Candidate	Votes	%
Democratic	Thomas L. Bailey	50,488	100.00
Total votes		50,488	100.00
Democratic hold			
