= Steve Hale (politician) =

American politician (born 1954)

Member of the Mississippi State Senate from the 10th district
- In office January 3, 2012 – January 5, 2016
- Preceded by: Nolan Mettetal
- Succeeded by: Bill Stone

Personal details
- Born: March 28, 1954 (age 72) Memphis, Tennessee, U.S.
- Party: Democratic
- Children: 2

Steve Hale (born March 28, 1954) is an American Democratic politician and businessman who served in the Mississippi State Senate, representing the 10th District, from 2012 to 2016.

== Early life ==
Steve Hale was born on March 28, 1954, in Memphis, Tennessee. He attended Magnolia Heights School where he played baseball, graduating in 1972. Hale graduated from Northwest Mississippi Community College. He then attended Mississippi State University, where he played as an infielder on the university baseball team, graduating in 1976. After graduation, Hale worked for a family lumber company from 1976 to 1991. In the 2010s he was a member of the advisory board of the First Tennessee Bank.

== Political career ==
Hale served as an alderman of Senatobia, Mississippi, from 1989 to 1993. He was Senatobia's mayor from 1993 to 2001. From 2002 to 2003, he was the deputy director of the Mississippi Development Authority and then was its executive director from 2003 to 2004. From 2005 to 2011, Hale was the director of the Tate County Planning Commission.

In 2011, Hale ran as a Democrat to represent the 10th District (parts of Panola and Tate Counties) in the Mississippi State Senate for the 2012–2016 term. Hale won the Democratic Primary, defeating Michael Cathey, on August 2, 2011. Hale then defeated Republican Vann Branch in the general election on November 8, 2011; Hale received 12,846 votes, or 63%, while Vann received 7,530 votes, or 37%.

During his term, Hale was the vice chair of the Economic Development Committee, and was a member of the following other committees: Accountability, Efficiency, and Transparency; Education; Finance; Investigate State Offices; Judiciary A; and Universities & Colleges.

Hale ran for re-election for the same district in 2015 for the 2016–2020 term. He lost the Democratic Party primary to Senator Bill Stone, with Hale receiving 3,922 votes or 42.2% of the vote, and Stone receiving 5,364 votes or 57.8% of the vote.

== Personal life ==
Hale is a Baptist. He is married to the former Cindy Rials and they have two children.
