= James Eastland =

American politician (1904–1986)

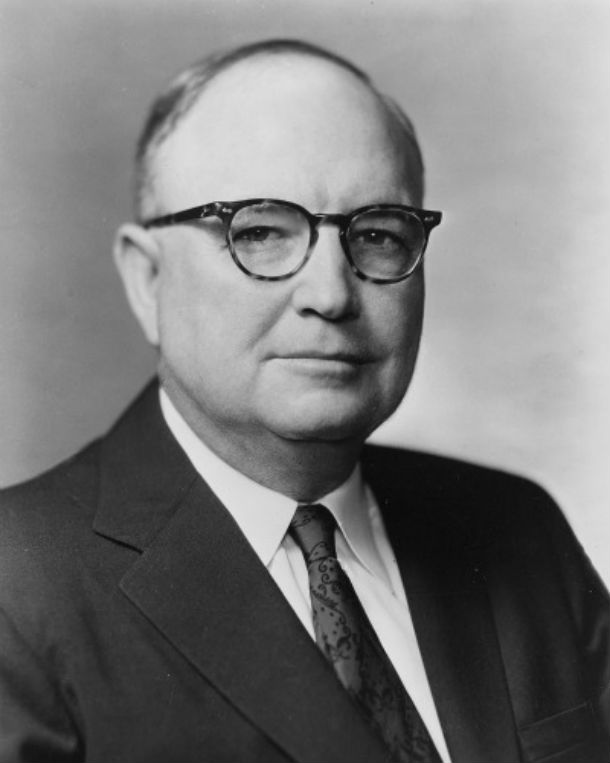

President pro tempore of the United States Senate
- In office July 28, 1972 – December 27, 1978
- Deputy: Hubert Humphrey (1977–1978)
- Preceded by: Allen J. Ellender
- Succeeded by: Warren Magnuson

Chair of the Senate Judiciary Committee
- In office January 3, 1957 – December 27, 1978
- Preceded by: Harley M. Kilgore
- Succeeded by: Ted Kennedy

United States Senator from Mississippi
- In office January 3, 1943 – December 27, 1978
- Preceded by: Wall Doxey
- Succeeded by: Thad Cochran
- In office June 30, 1941 – September 28, 1941
- Appointed by: Paul B. Johnson Sr.
- Preceded by: Pat Harrison
- Succeeded by: Wall Doxey

Member of the; Mississippi House of Representatives; from Scott County
- In office 1928–1932
- Preceded by: William D. Cook
- Succeeded by: Elwin B. Livingston

Personal details
- Born: James Oliver Eastland; November 28, 1904 Doddsville, Mississippi, U.S.
- Died: February 19, 1986 (aged 81) Greenwood, Mississippi, U.S.
- Resting place: Forest Cemetery, Forest, Mississippi
- Party: Democratic
- Spouse: Elizabeth Coleman Eastland
- Children: 4
- Education: University of Mississippi; Vanderbilt University; University of Alabama
- Profession: Attorney; Cotton planter

James Oliver Eastland (November 28, 1904 – February 19, 1986) was an American attorney, plantation owner, and politician from Mississippi. A Democrat, he served in the United States Senate in 1941 and again from 1943 until his resignation in late 1978. Eastland was a segregationist who led the Southern resistance against racial integration during the civil rights movement, often speaking of African Americans as "an inferior race". Eastland has been called the "Voice of the White South" and the "Godfather of Mississippi Politics".

The son of prominent attorney, politician, and cotton planter Woods Eastland, he attended the local schools of Scott County, Mississippi, and took courses at the University of Mississippi, Vanderbilt University, and the University of Alabama. He completed his legal education by studying in his father's office, attaining admission to the bar in 1927. Eastland practiced law in Sunflower County, Mississippi, and took over management of his family's cotton plantation. Becoming active in politics as a Democrat, he served in the Mississippi House of Representatives from 1928 to 1932.

When Senator Pat Harrison died in office in 1941, the governor appointed Eastland to fill the vacancy on the condition that Eastland not run in that year's special election to complete the term. Eastland served from June to September 1941. The special election was won by Wall Doxey. Eastland went on to defeat Doxey in the 1942 primary for the Democratic nomination for a full term. The Democratic Party was then essentially the only party in Mississippi, assuring Eastland's return to the Senate in January 1943. Eastland was reelected five times, serving until resigning in December 1978, days before the end of his final term. Eastland advanced through seniority to the chairmanship of the Senate Judiciary Committee, serving over 20 years, and President pro tempore of the Senate.

== Early life ==
Eastland was born in Doddsville, in the Mississippi Delta on November 28, 1904, the son of Woods Caperton Eastland, a lawyer and cotton planter, and Alma Teresa (Austin) Eastland. He was named James after his late uncle, who was allegedly murdered earlier in 1904 by Luther Holbert, who was subsequently lynched. In 1905 he moved with his parents to Forest, the county seat of Scott County, Mississippi. His father was active in Mississippi politics and served as a district attorney. The son attended the local segregated public schools and graduated from Forest High School in 1922.

Eastland attended the University of Mississippi (1922-1924), Vanderbilt University (1925-1926), and the University of Alabama (1926-1927). He studied law in his father's office, attained admission to the bar in 1927, and practiced in Sunflower County. Active in politics, he was elected to one term in the Mississippi House of Representatives, and served from 1928 to 1932. After completing his House term, Eastland remained active in politics and government. He was a sought-after campaign speaker, including speeches on behalf of the gubernatorial candidacies of Paul B. Johnson Sr. in 1935 and 1939. In addition, he was a member of the board of trustees of the state hospital for the insane.

In the 1930s, Eastland took over management of his family's Sunflower County plantation; he eventually expanded it to nearly 6,000 acres (24 km^{2}). Even after entering politics, he considered himself first and foremost a cotton planter. Cotton plantations were adopting mechanization but he still had many African-American laborers on the plantation, most of whom worked as sharecroppers.

== Senate career ==
Eastland was appointed to the U.S. Senate in June 1941 by Governor Paul B. Johnson Sr., following the death of Senator Pat Harrison. Johnson first offered the appointment to Woods Eastland, whom he had known since childhood; Woods Eastland declined and suggested his son. Johnson appointed James Eastland on the condition that he would not run later that year in the special election to complete the term, ensuring that no candidate would have the advantage of incumbency. Eastland kept his word, and served until November; the election was won by 2nd District Congressman Wall Doxey.

In 1942, Eastland was one of three candidates who challenged Doxey for a full term. Doxey had the support of President Franklin D. Roosevelt and Mississippi's senior U.S. Senator, Theodore G. Bilbo, but Eastland defeated him in the Democratic primary. At the time, Mississippi was effectively a one-party state, dominated by white Democrats since the disfranchisement of African Americans with the passage of the 1890 state constitution, which allowed poll taxes, literacy tests and white primaries to exclude them from the political system. This made winning the Democratic primary tantamount to election, and Eastland returned to the Senate on January 3, 1943. Roosevelt and Eastland developed a working relationship that enabled Eastland to oppose New Deal programs that were unpopular in Mississippi, while he supported the President's agenda on other issues. Eastland was effective in developing that type of arrangement with presidents of both parties during his long tenure in the Senate. Also effective because of his seniority, he gained major federal investment in the state, such as infrastructure construction including the Tennessee–Tombigbee Waterway and federal relief after disasters such as Hurricane Camille.

Early 1947 saw a renewed effort by the Truman administration to promote civil rights with activities such as President Truman addressing the National Association for the Advancement of Colored People (NAACP) and delivering an address to Congress entirely dedicated to the subject. Eastland, among many other Southerners who saw the civil rights backing of the administration as an attack on their "way of life", addressed the Senate floor a week after Truman's speech on the matter, saying Southerners were expected to "remain docile" in light of their laws and culture being destroyed "under the false guise of another civil-rights bill." Six weeks before the 1948 United States presidential election, Eastland predicted the defeat of the incumbent President Harry Truman, telling an audience in Memphis, Tennessee that voting for him was a waste. After Truman's surprise victory, Eastland "remained publicly undaunted".

In 1956, Eastland was appointed chairman of the Senate Judiciary Committee, and he served in this position until his retirement from the Senate. He was re-elected five times. He did not face substantive Republican opposition until 1966, as party politics were realigning after passage of the Civil Rights Act of 1964 and the Voting Rights Act of 1965. In 1966, freshman Representative Prentiss Walker, the first Republican to represent Mississippi at the federal level since Reconstruction, ran against Eastland. The Walker campaign was an early Republican effort to attract white conservatives to its ranks, because recently passed civil rights legislation had enabled African Americans in the South to begin participating in the political process, and most of them became active as liberals in the Democratic Party.

Former Republican Party state chairman Wirt Yerger had considered running against Eastland but bowed out after Walker announced his candidacy. Walker ran well to Eastland's right, accusing him of not having done enough to keep integration-friendly judges from being confirmed by the Senate. As is often the case when a one-term representative runs against a popular incumbent senator or governor, Walker was soundly defeated. Years later, Yerger said that Walker's decision to relinquish his House seat after one term for the vagaries of a Senate race against Eastland was "very devastating" to the growth of the Mississippi Republicans.

In February 1960, Senator Kenneth B. Keating made a motion to report an Eisenhower administration-backed civil rights bill out of the Senate Judiciary Committee. Olin D. Johnston objected on the grounds that the committee did not have permission to sit while the full Senate was meeting. Eastland upheld the objection. Keating later stated that Eastland intentionally refused to recognize him earlier, which prevented him from making his motion before the full Senate convened. Eastland disputed Keating's claim, stated that he had recognized Keating in an appropriate manner, and advised Keating not to repeat his claim to the full Senate. In September 1960, Eastland and Thomas Dodd said officials in the State Department cleared the way for the regime of Fidel Castro to reign in Cuba and that lower-ranking officials had misinformed Americans about the political climate of Cuba with assistance from the media. Incumbent Secretary of State Christian Herter responded to the claims by saying they were incorrect or misleading.

Eastland announced his support for United States Deputy Attorney General Byron White to replace the retiring Charles Evans Whittaker as Associate Justice on March 30, 1962, Eastland stating that White would be an able justice. White took office the following month. Eastland introduced an amendment that he stated would nullify the Supreme Court prayer decision on June 29, 1962. In September 1963, Eastland, fellow Mississippi Senator John Stennis, and Georgia Senator Richard Russell jointly announced their opposition to the ratification of the nuclear test ban treaty. The opposition was viewed as denting hopes of the Kennedy administration to be met with minimal disagreement during the treaty's appearance before the Senate.

In 1972, Eastland was reelected with 58 percent of the vote in his closest contest ever. His Republican opponent, Gil Carmichael, an automobile dealer from Meridian, was likely aided by President Richard Nixon's landslide reelection in 49 states, including taking 78 percent of Mississippi's popular vote. However, Nixon had worked "under the table" to support Eastland, a long-time personal friend. Nixon and other Republicans provided little support for Carmichael to avoid alienating conservative Southern Democrats, who increasingly supported Republican positions on many national issues. The Republicans worked to elect two House candidates, Trent Lott and Thad Cochran, both of whom later became influential U.S. senators. Recognizing that Nixon would handily carry Mississippi, Eastland did not endorse the Democratic presidential candidate, George McGovern of South Dakota, who was considered a liberal. Four years later, Eastland supported the candidacy of fellow Southern Democrat Jimmy Carter of Georgia, rather than Nixon's successor, President Gerald R. Ford. Eastland's former press secretary, Larry Speakes, a Mississippi native, served as a press spokesman for Gerald Ford and Ford's running mate, US Senator Robert J. Dole.

In January 1970, after G. Harrold Carswell was accused of harboring both sexist and racist beliefs, Eastland told reporters that he believed this was the first instance of a Supreme Court nominee being challenged on his views on the legal rights of women. In April, the Senate Judiciary Committee scheduled a vote for a plan that if enacted would give each state one electoral vote for each congressional district. During a meeting with reporters, Eastland espoused his view that the Senate would not approve any constitutional amendment reforming the presidential election system that year. In November, along with fellow Southerners Strom Thurmond and Sam J. Ervin Jr., Eastland was one of three senators to vote against an occupational safety bill that would establish federal supervision to oversee working conditions. Later that month, after President Nixon vetoed a curb on spending for political broadcasts, Republican leader Hugh Scott announced that he would offer comprehensive campaign reforms the following year and called for senators to join him in sustaining the veto. It was agreed by members of both parties that Eastland was one of eight senators who were essential to supporting Democratic opposition to the veto and thereby make the difference in overriding it.

In April 1971, Eastland introduced a six‐bill package intended to adjust the Internal Security Act of 1950 in addition to plugging loopholes noted by various decisions made by the Supreme Court, Eastland noting that his proposed version of the Internal Security Act would give the Subversive Activities Control Board more efficiency. In October 1971, after President Richard Nixon nominated Lewis F. Powell and William Rehnquist to the Supreme Court, Eastland announced his intent to hasten the hearings of Rehnquist and Powell while admitting his doubts that hearings would begin the following week given the Senate being in recess. In October 1974, Eastland was one of five senators to sponsor legislation authored by Jesse Helms permitting prayer in public schools and taking the issue away from the Supreme Court which had previously ruled in 1963 that school prayer violated the First Amendment to the United States Constitution through the establishment of a religion. In June 1976, Eastland joined a coalition of Democratic politicians who endorsed Georgia Governor Jimmy Carter for the presidency. The New York Times assessed Stennis and Eastland as jointly "trying to pull Mississippi out for Mr. Carter" in their first campaign for a national Democrat in decades.

On May 18, 1977, Eastland made a joint appearance with President Jimmy Carter in the Rose Garden in support of proposed foreign intelligence surveillance legislation. Eastland said the legislation was "vitally needed in this country" and that he was satisfied with its bipartisan support. Over the summer of 1977, the Justice Department enlisted the aid of Eastland as part of its effort to thwart "balkanization" of litigation authority, Eastland and Attorney General Griffin Bell moving to block six measures that if enacted would have permitted the independent agencies to go to court under certain circumstances in the event the Justice Department did not act on a case 45 days after it was referred to the department. By August 1977, the Carter administration reached a compromise plan to stem the flow of illegal aliens into the United States, Eastland, Attorney General Bell, and United States Secretary of Labor F. Ray Marshall agreeing to civil penalties up to $1,000 (~$4,141 in 2025) for offending employers. By September 1977, the seventy-three-year-old Eastland was considering retirement, with discussions of Ted Kennedy assuming his position as Chairman of the Senate Judiciary Committee. In October 1977, Eastland was one of several influential senators invited to meet with President Carter as the latter tried gaining support in the Senate for the Panama Canal treaties.

=== Nixon resignation ===
On February 14, 1974, Special Prosecutor for the U.S. Department of Justice Leon Jaworski wrote to Eastland complaining that President Nixon had refused to give him material that he needed for his Watergate investigation including 27 tapes relating to the Watergate cover‐up in addition to political donations of milk producers and the activities of the plumbers unit of the White House. The contents of the letter to Eastland were disclosed to the public by Jaworski the following month. In May, the House Judiciary Committee opened impeachment hearings against President Nixon after the release of 1,200 pages of transcripts of White House conversations between him and his aides and the administration. That month, the Senate Judiciary Committee passed a resolution supporting Jaworski observing that he was "acting within the scope of the authority conferred upon him". Eastland's support for the resolution was seen by observers as part of a pattern of Nixon backers turning against him in light of the Watergate scandal. In August, Newsweek magazine released Eastland's name as one of thirty-six senators who the White House believed would support President Nixon remaining in office in the event of impeachment. The article mentioned the White House believing some of the supporters were shaky and that thirty-four of them would need to remain firm to override a potential conviction. Within days of the article's release, Nixon resigned the presidency in the face of near-certain impeachment.

=== Senate President pro tempore ===
During his last Senate term, Eastland was the longest-serving member of the majority party and was elected President pro tempore. Eastland is the most recent President pro tempore to have served during a vacancy in the Vice Presidency. He did so twice during the tumultuous 1970s, first from October to December 1973, following Spiro Agnew's resignation until the swearing-in of Gerald Ford as Vice President, and then from August to December 1974, from the time that Ford became President until Nelson Rockefeller was sworn in as Vice President. Then, Eastland was second in the presidential line of succession, behind only Speaker of the House Carl Albert.

== Political positions ==
=== Opposition to civil rights ===
Eastland opposed integration and the civil rights movement. During World War II, Eastland vocally opposed and denigrated the service of African American soldiers in the war. He incited protests and comparisons to Hitlerism following a vitriolic speech on the floor of the Senate in July 1945, in which he complained that the Negro soldier was physically, morally, and mentally incapable of serving in combat. Eastland claimed that the "boys from the South were fighting to maintain white supremacy". In 1944 Eastland said:

I have no prejudice in my heart, but the white race is the superior race and the Negro race an inferior race and the races must be kept separate by law.

The same year, he protested against Smith v. Allwright, which banned white primaries:

This decision reveals an alarming tendency to destroy the sovereignty of the states. Our supreme court is usurping the legislative function, and Congress may yet prove the last citadel of constitutional government.

As a member of the Senate Judiciary Committee, Eastland would alongside fellow southerners Olin D. Johnston of South Carolina and Harley M. Kilgore of West Virginia be one of three senators to report negatively on Earl Warren when President Eisenhower nominated him to the Supreme Court. He later was one of eleven senators to vote against John Marshall Harlan II and one of seventeen to vote against Potter Stewart. When the Supreme Court issued its decision in the landmark case Brown v. Board of Education, ruling that segregation in public schools was unconstitutional, Eastland, like the majority of Southern Democrats, denounced it. In a speech given in Senatobia, Mississippi on August 12, 1955, he announced:

On May 17, 1954, the Constitution of the United States was destroyed because of the Supreme Court's decision. You are not obliged to obey the decisions of any court which are plainly fraudulent sociological considerations.

Eastland would become actively involved with the White Citizens' Council, an organization which boasted 60,000 members across the South and was called "the new Klan that enforces thought control by economic pressures." Eastland testified to the Senate ten days after the Brown decision:

The Southern institution of racial segregation or racial separation was the correct, self-evident truth which arose from the chaos and confusion of the Reconstruction period. Separation promotes racial harmony. It permits each race to follow its own pursuits, and its own civilization. Segregation is not discrimination ... Mr. President, it is the law of nature, it is the law of God, that every race has both the right and the duty to perpetuate itself. All free men have the right to associate exclusively with members of their own race, free from governmental interference, if they so desire.

On July 24, 1957, interviewed by Mike Wallace on the occasion of the passing of the Civil Rights Act of 1957, Eastland said segregation was wanted by both races:

As I said, we have more Nigra professional men, more businessmen, we have substantial Nigra cotton planters. In fact, they have made more progress in the South than in the North. The master-servant relationship today is largely a Northern product.

In the 1960s, Eastland belonged to the Genetics Committee of the Pioneer Fund. Civil rights workers Mickey Schwerner, James Chaney, and Andrew Goodman went missing in Mississippi on June 21, 1964, during the Freedom Summer efforts to register African American voters. Eastland tried to convince President Lyndon Johnson that the incident was a hoax and there was no Ku Klux Klan in the state. He suggested that the three had gone to Chicago:

Johnson: Jim, we've got three kids missing down there. What can I do about it?

Eastland: Well, I don't know. I don't believe there's ... I don't believe there's three missing.

Johnson: We've got their parents down here.

Eastland: I believe it's a publicity stunt ...

Johnson once said:

Jim Eastland could be standing right in the middle of the worst Mississippi flood ever known, and he'd say the niggers caused it, helped out by the Communists.

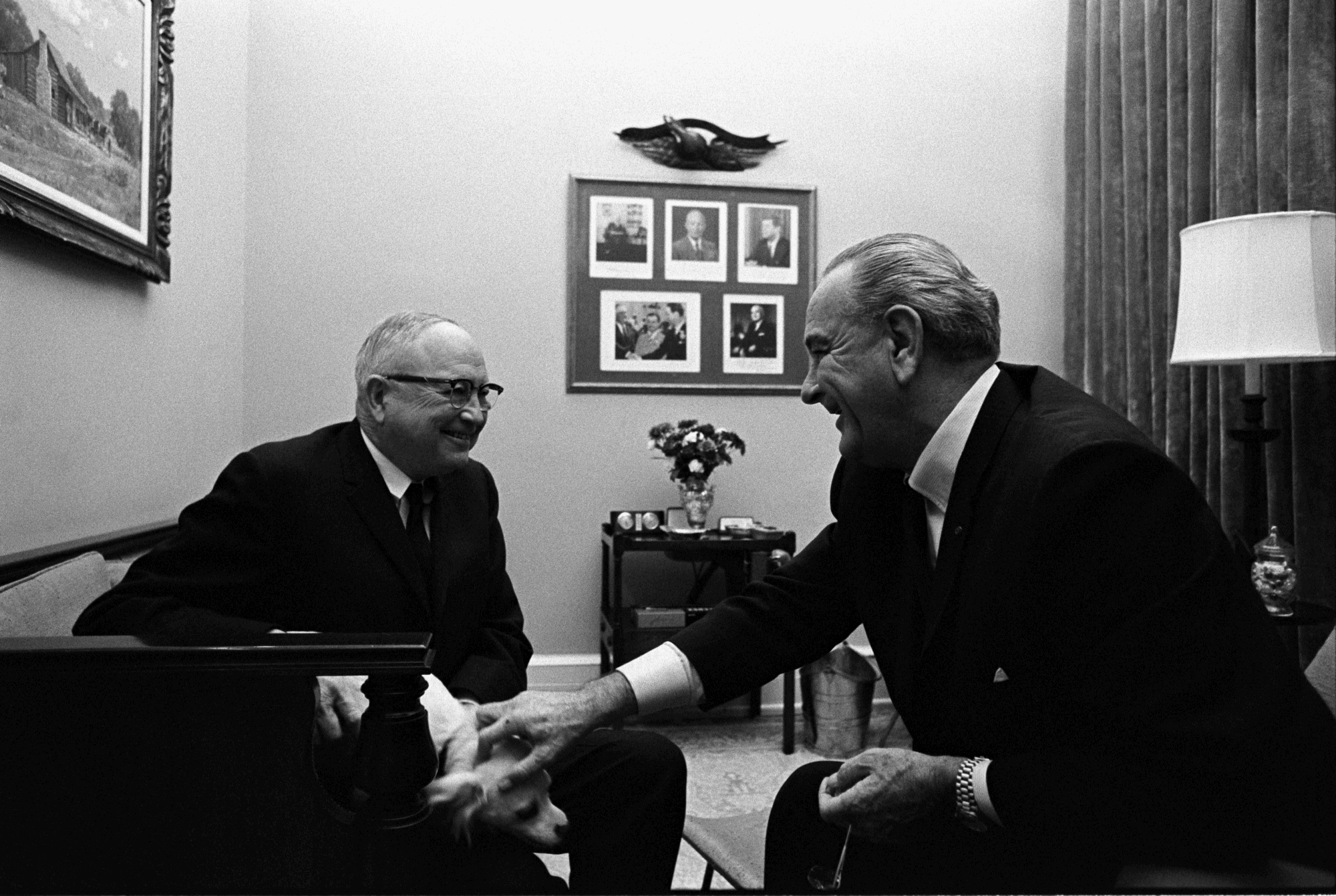
Senator Eastland with President Lyndon B. Johnson in 1968.

Eastland, like most of his Southern colleagues, opposed the Civil Rights Act of 1964, which prohibited segregation of public places and facilities. Its passage caused many Mississippi Democrats to support Barry Goldwater's presidential bid that year, but Eastland did not publicly oppose the election of Johnson. Four years earlier he had quietly supported John F. Kennedy's presidential campaign, but Mississippi voted that year for unpledged electors. Although Republican Senator Goldwater was strongly defeated by incumbent Johnson, he carried Mississippi with 87.14 percent of the popular vote, which constitutes the best-ever Republican showing in any state since the founding of that party. In 1964, almost all blacks in Mississippi remained excluded from voting, thus Goldwater's mammoth win essentially constituted the vote of the white population.

Eastland was often at odds with Johnson's policy on civil rights, but they retained a close friendship based on long years together in the Senate. Johnson often sought Eastland's support and guidance on other issues, such as the nomination of Abe Fortas in 1968 as Chief Justice of the United States. The Solid South opposed him. In the 1950s, Johnson was one of three senators from the South who did not sign the Southern Manifesto of resistance to Brown v. Board of Education, but Eastland and most Southern senators did, vowing resistance to school integration.

Eastland lobbied for the appointment of his friend Harold Cox to a federal judgeship, promising John F. Kennedy, who planned to appoint Thurgood Marshall to the United States Court of Appeals, that he would permit Marshall's confirmation to go forward if Cox was also appointed to the bench. This was in keeping with Kennedy's approach to handling Eastland; not wanting to upset the powerful chairman of the Judiciary Committee, Kennedy generally acceded to Eastland's requests on judicial appointments in Mississippi, which resulted in white segregationists dominating the state's federal courts. Though Eastland agreed to allow Marshall's nomination to proceed, he and senators Robert Byrd, John McClellan, Olin D. Johnston, Sam Ervin, and Strom Thurmond, made unsuccessful attempts to block Marshall's confirmation to the Second Circuit Court of Appeals and the U.S. Supreme Court.

In early 1969, Eastland went to Rhodesia and came back praising the White minority regime for the "racial harmony" supposedly lacking from America. According to Ken Flower, head of the Rhodesian Central Intelligence Operation, Eastland once complained about the fact a hostel of Salisbury was integrated, stating "You've inserted the thin end of the wedge by allowing stinking niggers into such a fine hotel". When he considered running for reelection in 1978, Eastland sought black support from Aaron Henry, civil rights leader and president of the National Association for the Advancement of Colored People. Henry told Eastland that it would be difficult for him to earn the support of black voters given his "master-servant philosophy with regard to blacks." Eastland decided not to seek re-election. Partly because of the independent candidacy of Charles Evers siphoning off votes from the Democratic nominee, Maurice Dantin, Republican 4th District Representative Thad Cochran won the race to succeed Eastland. Eastland resigned the day after Christmas, enabling the governor to appoint Cochran to complete the last few days of Eastland's term, which gave Cochran a seniority advantage over other senators elected in 1978. After his retirement, Eastland remained friends with Aaron Henry and sent contributions to the NAACP, but he said that he "didn't regret a thing" in his public career.

=== Antisemitism ===
In 1968, after opposing the nomination of Abe Fortas to Chief Justice, Eastland, as chair of the Judiciary committee, said "After [Thurgood] Marshall, I could not go back to Mississippi if a Jewish chief justice swore in the next president." In 1977, Eastland "sneer(ed) openly at Senator Jacob Javits, saying, 'I don't like you or your kind,' because Javits was Jewish."

=== Anticommunism ===
Eastland served on a subcommittee in the 1950s investigating the Communist Party in the United States. As chairman of the Internal Security Subcommittee, he subpoenaed some employees of The New York Times to testify about their activities. The paper was taking a strong position on its editorial page that Mississippi should adhere to the Brown decision, and claimed that Eastland was persecuting them on that account. The Times said in its January 5, 1956 editorial:

Our faith is strong that long after Senator Eastland and his present subcommittee are gone, long after segregation has lost its final battle in the South, long after all that was known as McCarthyism is a dim, unwelcome memory, long after the last Congressional committee has learned that it cannot tamper successfully with a free press, The New York Times will be speaking for the men who make it, and only for the men who make it, and speaking, without fear or favor, the truth as it sees it.

Eastland subsequently allowed the subcommittee to become dormant as communist fears receded.

=== Marijuana ===
In 1974, Eastland led congressional subcommittee hearings into marijuana, the report on which concluded:

... five years of research has provided strong evidence that, if corroborated, would suggest that marijuana in various forms is far more hazardous than originally suspected.

== Relationship with FBI ==
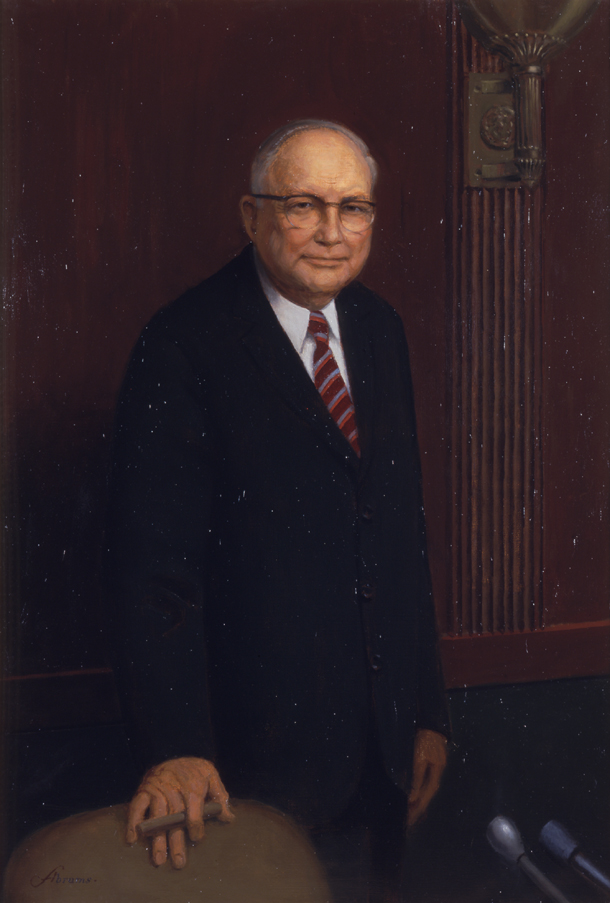
Official U.S. Senate portrait of Eastland

Eastland was a staunch supporter of FBI Director J. Edgar Hoover, and shared intelligence with the FBI, including leaks from the State Department. An investigation initiated by Attorney General Robert F. Kennedy and executed by former FBI agent Walter Sheridan traced some of the unauthorized disclosures to Otto Otepka of the State Department Office of Security. Hoover received intelligence that Eastland was among members of Congress who had received money and favors from Rafael Trujillo, dictator of the Dominican Republic. Eastland had regularly defended him from the Senate floor. Hoover declined to pursue Eastland on corruption charges.

== Later years ==
In his last years in the Senate, Eastland was recognized by most senators as one who knew how to wield the legislative powers he had accumulated. Many senators, including liberals who opposed many of his positions, acknowledged the fairness with which he chaired the Judiciary Committee, sharing staff and authority that chairmen of other committees jealously held for themselves. He maintained friendly personal ties with liberal Democrats such as Ted Kennedy, Walter Mondale, Joe Biden and Philip Hart, even though they disagreed on many issues. Following Johnson's retirement from the White House, Eastland frequently visited Johnson at his Texas ranch.

In an event recounted by Patrick Leahy in his 2022 memoir, Ted Kennedy once sought to advance in the Judiciary Committee a bill that Eastland opposed. Eastland promised Kennedy that if Kennedy secured enough votes for the measure to pass, Eastland would place it on the committee agenda, though Eastland would vote against it. Kennedy believed he had secured the votes, and true to his word, Eastland included it on the committee agenda. When the question was called, it failed by one vote. According to Leahy, Eastland questioned one senator who had cast a no vote as to whether he had given Kennedy his word to vote in favor. The senator indicated that he had, but that he had then changed his mind. Eastland told the lawmaker in question that when one senator gave his word to another, he was honor-bound to keep it. Eastland then changed his own vote to yes, allowing Kennedy's bill to pass. Afterward, the senator Eastland questioned never had one of his bills included on the committee agenda.

For many years, Eastland's closest friend and confidant was Leander Perez, a Democratic political boss and segregationist from Louisiana. Eastland died at a hospital in Greenwood, Mississippi, on February 19, 1986, from pneumonia as a complication of other health issues; he was 81.

While at a fundraiser on June 18, 2019, presidential candidate Biden said that one of his greatest strengths was "bringing people together" and pointed to his relationships with Eastland and fellow segregationist senator Herman Talmadge as examples. While imitating a Southern drawl, Biden remarked, "I was in a caucus with James O. Eastland. He never called me 'boy,' he always called me 'son.'” New Jersey Senator Cory Booker was one of many Democrats to criticize Biden for the remarks, issuing a statement that said, "You don't joke about calling black men 'boys.' Men like James O. Eastland used words like that, and the racist policies that accompanied them, to perpetuate white supremacy and strip black Americans of our very humanity".

== Portrayal in popular culture ==
Eastland was portrayed by actor Jeff Doucette in the 2016 HBO film All the Way and by Nicholas Bell in the 2022 film Elvis.

Party political offices
Preceded by Wall Doxey	Democratic nominee for U.S. Senator from Mississippi (Class 2); 1942, 1948, 1954, 1960, 1966, 1972	Succeeded by Maurice Dantin
U.S. Senate
Preceded by Pat Harrison	U.S. senator (Class 2) from Mississippi; June 30, 1941 – September 28, 1941; Served alongside: Theodore G. Bilbo	Succeeded by Wall Doxey
Preceded by Wall Doxey	U.S. senator (Class 2) from Mississippi; January 3, 1943 – December 27, 1978; Served alongside: Theodore G. Bilbo, John C. Stennis	Succeeded by Thad Cochran
Political offices
Preceded by Allen J. Ellender	President pro tempore of the United States Senate; 1972–1978	Succeeded by Warren G. Magnuson
Preceded by Harley M. Kilgore	Chairman of Senate Judiciary Committee; 1956–1978	Succeeded by Edward Kennedy
Honorary titles
Preceded by George Aiken	Dean of the United States Senate; January 3, 1975 – November 28, 1977; Served alongside: John L. McClellan	Succeeded by Himself
Preceded by Himself and John L. McClellan	Dean of the United States Senate; November 28, 1977 – January 3, 1979	Succeeded by Warren G. Magnuson
