= 1954 United States Senate election in Mississippi =

1954 U.S. Senate Democratic primary in Mississippi
- August 24, 1954
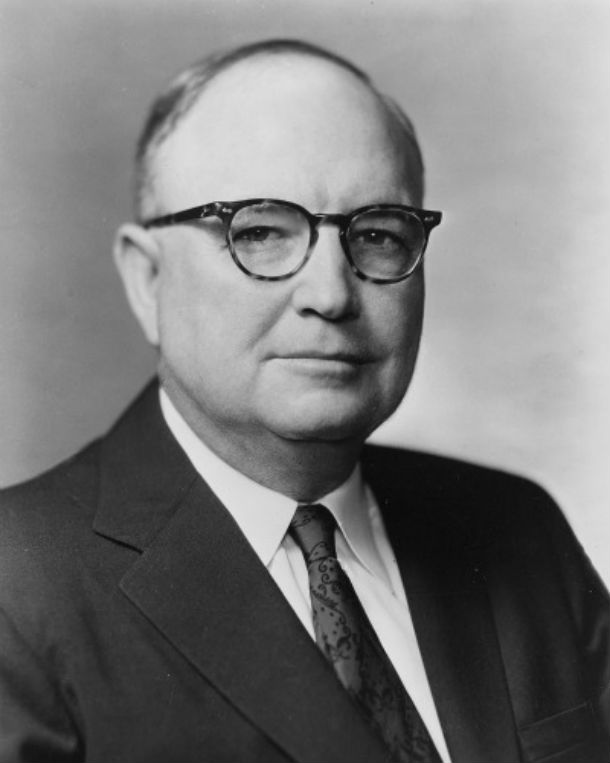

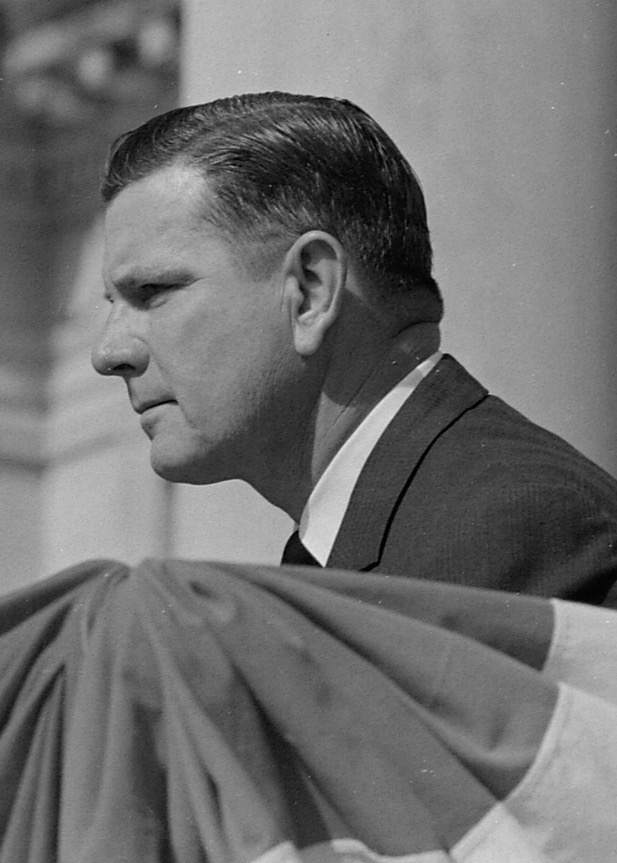
Nominee	James Eastland	Carroll Gartin
Party	Democratic	Democratic
Popular vote	136,836	83,761
Percentage	62.03%	37.97%
- County results Eastland: 50–60% 60–70% 70–80% 80–90% >90% Gartin: 50–60% 60–70%
U.S. senator before election
James Eastland
Democratic
Elected U.S. Senator
James Eastland
Democratic

The 1954 United States Senate election in Mississippi was held on November 2, 1954. Incumbent Democratic U.S. Senator James Eastland won re-election to his third term.

Because Eastland faced only nominal opposition in the general election, his victory in the August 24 primary over Lieutenant Governor Carroll Gartin was tantamount to election.

== Democratic primary ==
=== Candidates ===
- James Eastland, incumbent Senator since 1943 (Note: Eastland previously served a partial term as Senator in 1941.)
- Carroll Gartin, Lieutenant Governor of Mississippi

=== Results ===
1954 Democratic U.S. Senate primary
Party	Candidate	Votes	%
Democratic	James Eastland (incumbent)	136,836	62.03%
Democratic	Carroll Gartin	83,761	37.97%
Total votes		220,597	100.00%

== General election ==
=== Results ===
1954 U.S. Senate election in Mississippi
Party	Candidate	Votes	%	±%
Democratic	James O. Eastland (incumbent)	100,848	95.57%	▼4.43
Republican	James A. White	4,678	4.43%	N/A
Total votes		105,526	100.00%	

== See also ==
- 1954 United States Senate elections
