= Warner McBride =

American politician

Member of the Mississippi House of Representatives from the 10th district
- In office January 5, 1993 – January 3, 2012
- Succeeded by: Nolan Mettetal

Personal details
- Born: December 4, 1956 (age 69) Memphis, Tennessee
- Party: Democratic

Warner McBride (born December 4, 1956) is an American politician who served in the Mississippi House of Representatives from the 10th district from 1993 to 2012.
