= J. M. Causey =

American accountant and state official

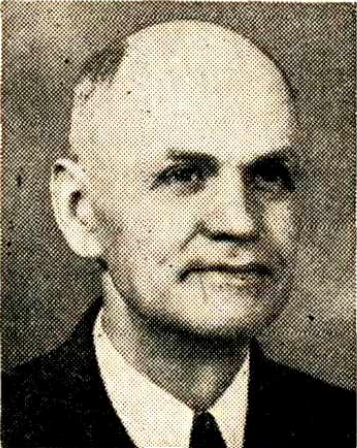
- c. 1940

30th State Auditor of Mississippi
- In office January 1940 – January 1944
- Governor: Paul B. Johnson, Jr. Dennis Murphree
- Preceded by: Carl Craig
- Succeeded by: Bert J. Barnett

Personal details
- Born: March 28, 1882 Mississippi, U.S.
- Died: January 26, 1960 (aged 77) Jackson, Mississippi, U.S.
- Political party: Democratic
- Children: 4

James M. Causey (March 28, 1882 - January 26, 1960) was an American accountant and state official. He was the 30th State Auditor of Mississippi, serving from 1940 to 1944.

== Early life ==
James M. Causey was born on March 28, 1882, in Mississippi. He was the eldest of ten children of William I. Causey, a farmer and state senator, and Hattie McLain Causey (died 1941). Causey attended Amite County's public schools. He then attended MississippI College and Soule College. After graduating from Soule College, Causey became an accountant.

== Career ==
Causey first lived in Liberty, Mississippi, where he became elected to the Board of Aldermen and served as mayor. Causey moved to Marks, Mississippi, in 1913. He worked as an auditor with the Self & Co. company at Marks from 1913 to 1919. In 1919, he was elected chancery clerk of Quitman County, and served for eight years from 1920 to 1928. He briefly worked as a public accountant in 1928. In 1929, Causey entered the Field department of the State Auditor's office, and served as a Deputy Field Auditor for ten years.

In August 1939, Causey defeated State Senator Bert J. Barnett in the Democratic primary for State Auditor of Mississippi. Causey received 153,580 votes, while Barnett received 134,650. Causey won the general election on November 7, 1939, and was inaugurated for the 1940–1944 term. In 1940, he moved to Jackson, where he would live for the rest of his life. Causey appointed John Craig, son of predecessor Carl Craig, as deputy auditor. He also appointed Mrs. R. D. Childress clerk and W. J. Hubbard field auditor.

On January 26, 1960, Causey died at 6:45 PM at a hospital in Jackson, Mississippi. He had been ill for one month.

== Personal life ==
Causey was a Baptist. He was active as a leader in the Shriners and Freemasons. On January 29, 1902, he married Amite County native Maude Mayhall (died 1957). They had four children: two daughters: Hattie Mae, who married Sam Orland Kuykendall; and Alice Dean, who married N. W. Carr; and two sons: James Maurice Causey Jr. and Ralph T. Causey.
