= 1960 United States Senate election in Mississippi =

- November 8, 1960
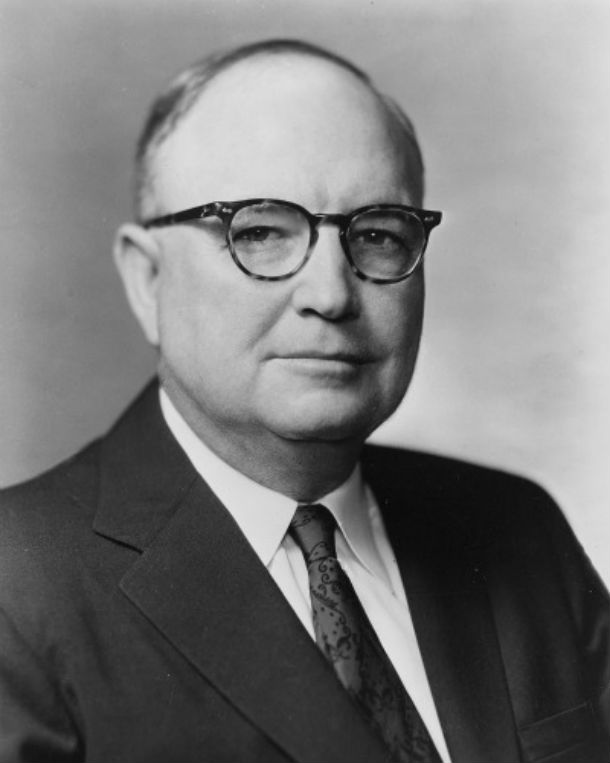

| Nominee | James Eastland | Joe Moore |
| Party | Democratic | Republican |
| Popular vote | 244,341 | 21,807 |
| Percentage | 91.81% | 8.19% |
- County results Eastland: 80–90% >90%
U.S. senator before election
James Eastland
Democratic
Elected U.S. Senator
James Eastland
Democratic

The 1960 United States Senate election in Mississippi was held on November 8, 1960.

Incumbent Senator James Eastland was re-elected to a fourth term in office against nominal opposition. The primary race attracted little attention and as was typical of elections in the South at this time, the general election was a foregone conclusion in favor of the Democratic candidate, Eastland.

== Democratic primary ==
=== Candidates ===
==== Declared ====
- Ance Blakeney, former Smith County Supervisor
- James Eastland, incumbent Senator

==== Withdrew ====
- Wayne McClure, Hattiesburg resident

=== Results ===
Primary results by county: Eastland: 80–90% >90%

1960 Democratic U.S. Senate primary
| Party | Candidate | Votes | % |
|---|---|---|---|
| Democratic | James Eastland (inc.) | 136,735 | 94.21% |
| Democratic | Ance Blakeney | 8,397 | 5.79% |
| Total votes | | 145,132 | 100.00% |

== Republican primary ==
=== Candidates ===
- Joe A. Moore, Pascagoula attorney

=== Results ===
Moore was unopposed for the Republican nomination.

== General election ==
=== Results ===
General election results
| Party | Candidate | Votes | % | ±% |
|---|---|---|---|---|
| Democratic | James Eastland (inc.) | 244,341 | 91.81% | ▼3.76 |
| Republican | Joe A. Moore | 21,807 | 8.19% | ▲3.76 |
| Total votes | | 266,148 | 100.00% | |

== See also ==
- 1960 United States Senate elections
