= Standing Pine, Mississippi =

- Census-designated place
- Location of Standing Pine, Mississippi

- Location in the United States
- Coordinates: 32°40′31″N 89°26′41″W
- Country: United States
- State: Mississippi
- County: Leake

Area
  - Total: 3.50 sq mi (9.06 km^{2})
  - Land: 3.49 sq mi (9.04 km^{2})
  - Water: 0.0077 sq mi (0.02 km^{2})
- Elevation: 443 ft (135 m)

Population (2020)
  - Total: 517
  - Density: 148.0/sq mi (57.16/km^{2})
- Time zone: UTC-6 (Central (CST))
  - Summer (DST): UTC-5 (CDT)
- FIPS code: 28-70120
- GNIS feature ID: 0707162

Standing Pine is a census-designated place (CDP) in Leake County, Mississippi, United States. It is one of the eight communities of the Mississippi Band of Choctaw Indians Reservation, and the population is 94% Choctaw. The total population of the CDP was 517 at the 2020 census.

== Geography ==
Standing Pine is located in southeastern Leake County at 32°40′31″N 89°26′41″W (32.675141, -89.444742). It is 8 miles (13 km) southeast of Carthage, the county seat.

According to the United States Census Bureau, the CDP has a total area of 3.5 square miles (9.1 km^{2}), of which 0.01 square miles (0.02 km^{2}), or 0.21%, are water. The community sits on a set of low ridges that drain northeast to Standing Pine Creek and southwest to Pottock Creek, both northwest-flowing tributaries of the Pearl River.

== Demographics ==
Historical population
Census	Pop.	Note	%±
2020	517		—
U.S. Decennial Census

Standing Pine racial composition as of 2020 (NH = Non-Hispanic) (Note: Note: the US Census treats Hispanic/Latino as an ethnic category. This table excludes Latinos from the racial categories and assigns them to a separate category. Hispanics/Latinos can be of any race.)
Race	Number	Percentage
White (NH)	49	9.48%
Black or African American (NH)	11	2.13%
Native American or Alaska Native (NH)	411	79.5%
Asian (NH)	1	0.19%
Mixed/Multi-Racial (NH)	23	4.45%
Hispanic or Latino	22	4.26%
Total	517	

As of the 2020 United States census, there were 517 people, 177 households, and 168 families residing in the CDP.

As of the census of 2000, there were 509 people, 135 households, and 112 families residing in the CDP. The population density was 158.8 inhabitants per square mile (61.3/km^{2}). There were 143 housing units at an average density of 44.6 units per square mile (17.2 units/km^{2}). The racial makeup of the CDP was 16.11% White, 1.18% African American, 82.12% Native American, 0.59% from other races. Hispanic or Latino of any race were 1.18% of the population.

There were 135 households, out of which 43.7% had children under the age of 18 living with them, 48.9% were married couples living together, 24.4% had a female householder with no husband present, and 16.3% were non-families. 15.6% of all households were made up of individuals, and 5.2% had someone living alone who was 65 years of age or older. The average household size was 3.77 and the average family size was 4.04.

In the CDP, the population was spread out, with 42.8% under the age of 18, 10.2% from 18 to 24, 26.9% from 25 to 44, 15.7% from 45 to 64, and 4.3% who were 65 years of age or older. The median age was 22 years. For every 100 females, there were 93.5 males. For every 100 females age 18 and over, there were 94.0 males.

The median income for a household in the CDP was $36,538, and the median income for a family was $28,558. Males had a median income of $20,833 versus $18,566 for females. The per capita income for the CDP was $10,111. About 10.1% of families and 15.4% of the population were below the poverty line, including 20.5% of those under age 18 and none of those age 65 or over.

== Education ==
Standing Pine is served by the Leake County School District.

Native American students are eligible to attend schools in the Choctaw Tribal School System, a tribal school system operated by the Mississippi Band of Choctaw Indians. Standing Pine Elementary School is in the community.

East Central Community College covers Leake County.

== Notable people ==
- Bert J. Barnett (1884–1949), state auditor of Mississippi
- Ross Barnett (1898–1987), governor of Mississippi
- David W. Huff, David and the Giants singer
