= Bill Stone (politician) =

American politician (born 1965)

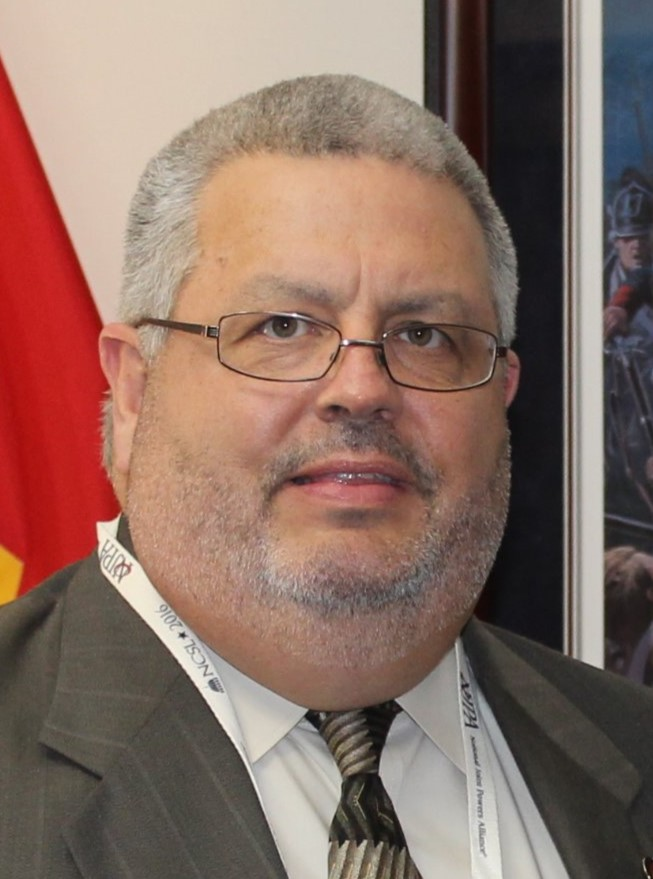

Member of the Mississippi State Senate from the 10th district
- In office January 5, 2016 – July 25, 2017
- Preceded by: Steve Hale
- Succeeded by: Neil S. Whaley

Member of the Mississippi State Senate from the 2nd district
- In office January 1, 2008 – January 5, 2016
- Preceded by: Ralph H. Doxey
- Succeeded by: David Parker

Personal details
- Born: Bill Stone; December 29, 1965 (age 60) Memphis, Tennessee, US
- Party: Democratic
- Spouse: Debbie
- Children: 3
- Education: University of Mississippi
- Profession: Real estate broker, appraiser

Bill Stone (born December 29, 1965, in Memphis, Tennessee) is a former Democratic member of the Mississippi State Senate and Chairman of the Mississippi Senate Democratic Caucus. He represented the 2nd district, which included Benton, Marshall and Tippah Counties, from 2008 to 2015 and 10th district which includes all of Tate County and most of Marshall County from 2016 to 2018. Prior to being elected Senator, Stone was twice elected Mayor of Ashland, Mississippi.

== Biography ==
Bill Stone was born December 29, 1965, in Memphis, Tennessee. He graduated from Northeast Community College and attended the University of Mississippi. Stone is married to the former Debbie Samples of Ashland and they have three children, Jessi Shaw, Will and Adam, and five grandchildren. Senator Stone is a member of the Commission on the Future of Northeast Mississippi, Ole Miss Alumni Association and is a retired volunteer firefighter.

In 2001, he was elected Mayor of Ashland and was reelected in 2005. As Mayor of Ashland, Stone served on the Mississippi Municipal League Board of Directors, Vice-chairman of the Municipal Gas Authority of Mississippi (MGAM), Chairman of the North Mississippi Mayors Association and continues to serve on the Commission on the Future of Northeast Mississippi.

== Mississippi Senate ==
In 2007, Stone ran for Mississippi Senate in the 2nd district and defeated incumbent Republican Ralph H. Doxey winning 61% of the vote to Doxey's 39%. He was re-elected in 2011 by an even larger margin winning 70% of the vote to his opponent's 30%.

Due to GOP gerrymandering, the 2nd district was collapsed and Stone's home in Ashland was moved into the 3rd district represented by longtime legislator Nickey Browning. Stone then moved to Holly Springs, Mississippi and ran for reelection in the 10th district against fellow incumbent, Steve Hale. In addition to Holly Springs, the new 10th district includes Senatobia, Coldwater, Independence, Tyro, Strayhorn, Thyatira and Sarah in Tate County and most of Marshall County excluding the northwest corner. Hale subsequently challenged Stone's residency in a case that went to the Mississippi Supreme Court. In a split decision, the court ruled that Stone was eligible to run in the new 10th district. Stone defeated Hale in the Democratic primary 57% to 43% and was unopposed in the general election.

Stone was elected vice-chairman of the Senate Democratic Caucus in 2016 and, at the beginning of the 2017 Legislative Session, was elected to replace Senator John Horhn resigned as chairman to spend more time on his campaign for Mayor of Jackson.

=== Committee assignments ===
Stone's committee assignments include: Executive Contingency Fund (chairman); Constitution; County Affairs; Finance; Forestry; Highways and Transportation; Municipalities; Universities and Colleges; and Wildlife, Fisheries and Parks.
