= 1939 Mississippi gubernatorial election =

1939 Mississippi Democratic gubernatorial primary runoff
- November 7, 1939
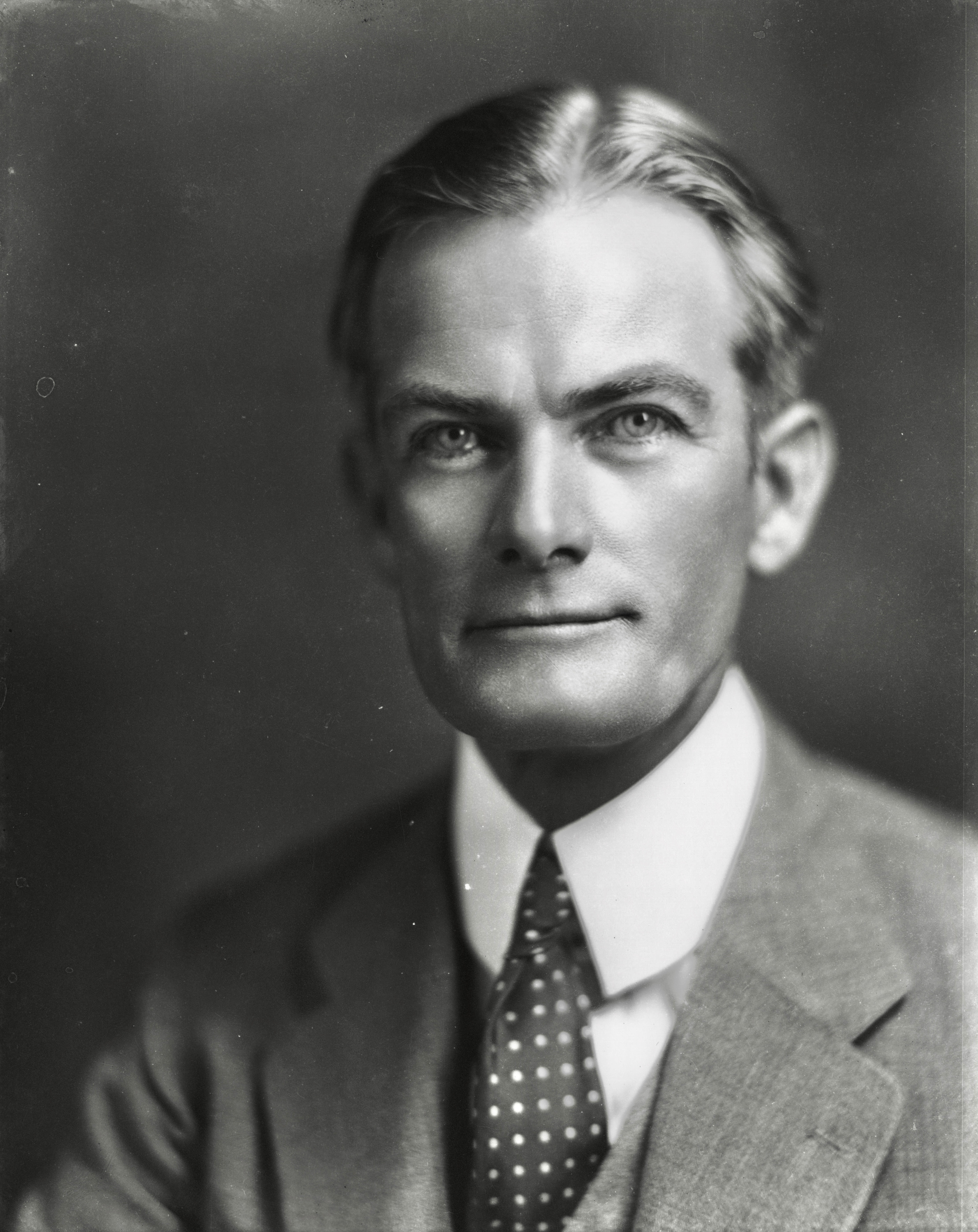

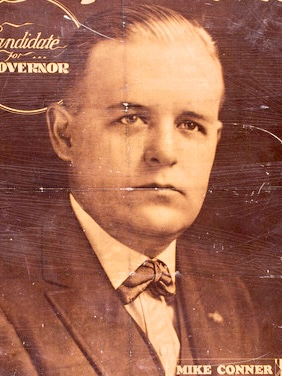
Nominee	Paul B. Johnson Sr.	Martin S. Conner
Party	Democratic	Democratic
Popular vote	163,620	135,724
Percentage	54.66%	45.34%
- County results Johnson: 50–60% 60–70% 70–80% Conner: 50–60% 60–70%
Governor before election
Hugh L. White
Democratic
Elected Governor
Paul B. Johnson Sr.
Democratic

The 1939 Mississippi gubernatorial election took place on November 7, 1939, in order to elect the Governor of Mississippi. Incumbent Democrat Hugh L. White was term-limited, and could not run for reelection to a second term. As was common at the time, the Democratic candidate ran unopposed in the general election so therefore the Democratic primary was the real contest, and winning the primary was considered tantamount to election.

== Democratic primary ==
No candidate received a majority in the Democratic primary, which featured seven contenders, so a runoff was held between the top two candidates. The runoff election was won by former U.S. Representative Paul B. Johnson Sr., who defeated former Governor Martin S. Conner.

=== Results ===
Mississippi Democratic gubernatorial primary, 1939
Party	Candidate	Votes	%
Democratic	Paul B. Johnson Sr.	103,099	33.53
Democratic	Martin S. Conner	79,305	25.79
Democratic	Thomas L. Bailey	58,987	19.18
Democratic	Lester C. Franklin	31,845	10.36
Democratic	Jacob Buehler Snider	24,244	7.88
Democratic	Mark W. Gantt	5,214	1.70
Democratic	George P. Ritchey	4,796	1.56
Total votes		307,490	100.00

=== Runoff ===
Mississippi Democratic gubernatorial primary runoff, 1939
Party	Candidate	Votes	%
Democratic	Paul B. Johnson Sr.	163,620	54.66
Democratic	Martin S. Conner	135,724	45.34
Total votes		299,344	100.00

== General election ==
In the general election, Johnson ran unopposed.

=== Results ===
Mississippi gubernatorial election, 1939
Party	Candidate	Votes	%
Democratic	Paul B. Johnson Sr.	61,614	100.00
Total votes		61,614	100.00
Democratic hold			
