= Nolan Mettetal =

American politician (1945–2020)

Member of the Mississippi House of Representatives from the 10th district
- In office January 3, 2012 – January 7, 2020
- Preceded by: Warner McBride
- Succeeded by: Brady Williamson

Member of the Mississippi State Senate from the 10th district
- In office January 2, 1996 – January 3, 2012
- Preceded by: Ronnie Musgrove
- Succeeded by: Steve Hale

Personal details
- Born: Henry Nolan Mettetal; November 19, 1945 Baton Rouge, Louisiana, U.S.
- Died: December 28, 2020 (aged 75) Oxford, Mississippi, U.S.
- Party: Republican (2008–2020)
- Other political affiliations: Democratic (before 2008)
- Spouse: Kay Ford
- Education: University of Mississippi

Henry Nolan Mettetal (November 19, 1945 – December 28, 2020) was an American politician from Mississippi.

== Life and career ==
A member of the Republican party, Mettetal served as member of the Mississippi House of Representatives from the 10th District from 2012 to 2020. He previously served on the Mississippi Senate from 1996 to 2012.

He died from COVID-19 at Baptist Memorial Hospital of North Mississippi in Oxford, Mississippi, on December 28, 2020, aged 75.
