= Wall Doxey =

American politician (1892–1962)

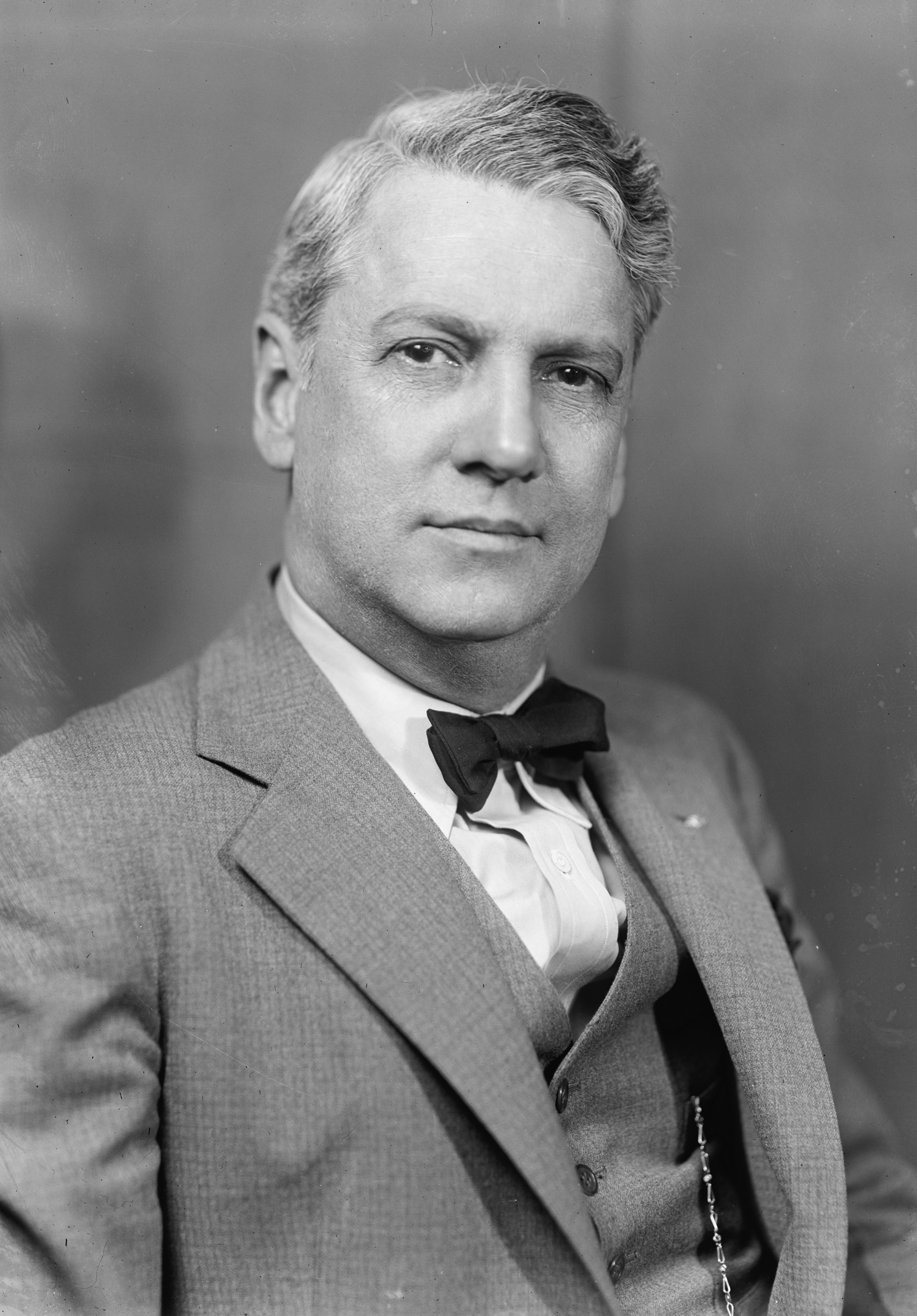

United States Senator from Mississippi
- In office September 29, 1941 – January 3, 1943
- Preceded by: James Eastland
- Succeeded by: James Eastland

Member of the U.S. House of Representatives from Mississippi's 2nd district
- In office March 4, 1929 – September 28, 1941
- Preceded by: Bill G. Lowrey
- Succeeded by: Jamie Whitten

19th Sergeant at Arms of the United States Senate
- In office February 1, 1943 – January 3, 1947
- Leader: Alben W. Barkley
- Preceded by: Chesley W. Jurney
- Succeeded by: Edward F. McGinnis

Personal details
- Born: August 8, 1892 Holly Springs, Mississippi, US
- Died: March 2, 1962 (aged 69) Memphis, Tennessee, US
- Resting place: Hillcrest Cemetery, Holly Springs, Mississippi
- Party: Democratic
- Spouse: Myrtle Frances Johnson
- Relations: Ralph H. Doxey (grandson)
- Children: 1
- Education: University of Mississippi; University of Mississippi School of Law
- Profession: Attorney

Wall Doxey (August 8, 1892 – March 2, 1962) was an American lawyer and politician from Holly Springs, Mississippi. A Democrat, he served in the United States House of Representatives from 1929 to 1941 and the United States Senate from 1941 to 1943.

== Early life ==
Wall Doxey was born in Holly Springs, Mississippi on August 8, 1892, a son of John Sanford Doxey and Sarah Corrolla (Jones) Doxey. He was raised and educated in Holly Springs, and graduated from the University of Mississippi with an A.B. in 1913. In 1914, he received his LL.B. from the University of Mississippi School of Law.

Doxey was admitted to the bar in 1914 and practiced in Holly Springs. In 1916, he married Myrtle Frances Johnson of Jackson, Tennessee. They were the parents of a son, Wall Doxey Jr. Ralph H. Doxey, who served in the Mississippi House of Representatives and Mississippi Senate, is Doxey's grandson.

=== Early political and community activities ===
A Democrat, Doxey served as prosecuting attorney of Marshall County from 1915 to 1923. From 1923 to 1929, he was district attorney for Mississippi's Third Judicial District.

In addition to membership in the Methodist Episcopal Church, South, Doxey was active in Freemasonry and the Shriners. He also belonged to the Elks, Rotary Club, Phi Delta Phi legal fraternity and Omicron Delta Kappa college fraternity.

== Congress ==
=== U.S. House ===
In 1928, Doxey was elected to represent Mississippi's 2nd congressional district in the United States House of Representatives. He was reelected six times, and served from 1929 to 1941. Doxey was a delegate to the Democratic National Conventions of 1932, 1936, and 1940.

Throughout his political career, Doxey represented a district with a black-majority population. Black voters were largely affiliated with the Republican Party in the 19th and early 20th centuries, but they were effectively excluded from Mississippi's political system by the state constitution and legal restrictions that prevented them from registering to vote.

=== U.S. Senate ===
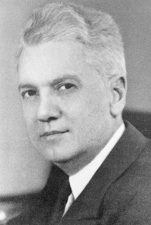
Doxey as a Senator

After the death of U.S. Senator Pat Harrison, Doxey won a special election to fill the seat, and served in the United States Senate from 1941 until 1943. He was defeated in the 1942 Democratic primary by James Eastland.

== Later career ==
Doxey served as United States Senate Sergeant at Arms from February 1, 1943, to January 3, 1947. He is the only former senator to have served in this post. He served for the rest of 1947 as a hearing examiner for the United States Department of Agriculture. Doxey then returned to Holly Springs, where he practiced law until his retirement.

=== Death and burial ===
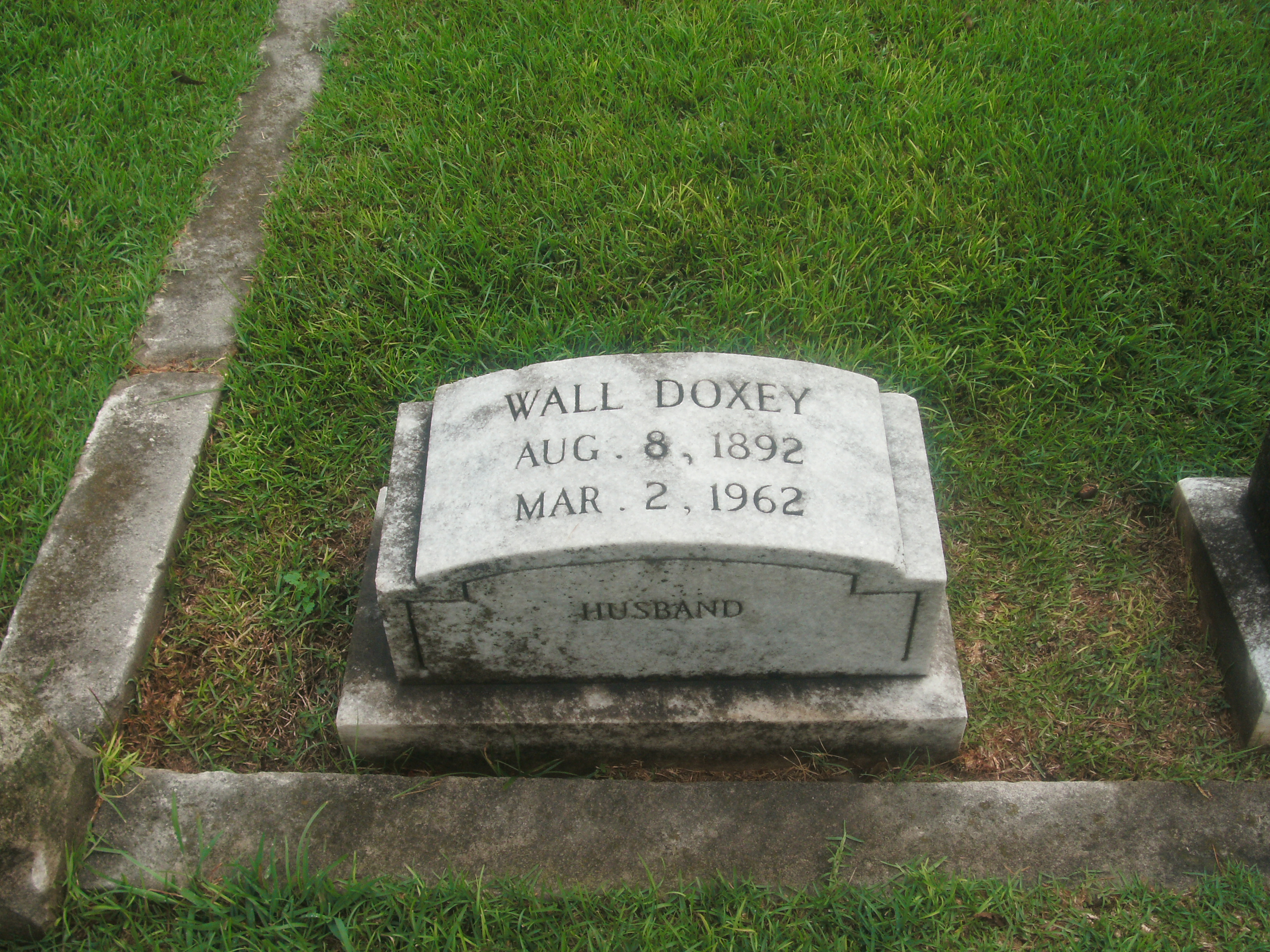
Doxey's grave in Hillcrest Cemetery

Doxey died in Memphis, Tennessee on March 2, 1962. He was buried at Hillcrest Cemetery in Holly Springs.

== Legacy ==
Mississippi's Wall Doxey State Park is named for Doxey. Construction of the park took place from 1935 to 1938, and it was the eighth of ten Mississippi parks built by the Civilian Conservation Corps. Originally named Spring Lake State Park, the site was renamed in 1956. In 1997, the older part of the site was listed on the National Register of Historic Places as the Wall Doxey State Park Historic District.

Party political offices
Preceded by Pat Harrison	Democratic nominee for U.S. Senator from Mississippi (Class 2); 1941	Succeeded by James Eastland
U.S. House of Representatives
Preceded by Bill G. Lowrey	Member of the U.S. House of Representatives from Mississippi's 2nd congressional district 1929-1941	Succeeded by Jamie L. Whitten
U.S. Senate
Preceded by James Eastland	U.S. senator (Class 2) from Mississippi; 1941–1943; Served alongside: Theodore G. Bilbo	Succeeded by James Eastland
Political offices
Preceded by Chesley W. Jurney	Sergeant at Arms of the United States Senate; 1943 - 1947	Succeeded by Edward F. McGinnis
