= Ralph H. Doxey =

American politician (born 1950)

Member of the Mississippi Senate from the 2nd district
- In office January 2004 – January 2008
- Preceded by: Bill Stone

Member of the Mississippi House of Representatives from the multiple district
- In office January 1976 – January 1988

Personal details
- Born: December 7, 1950 (age 75) Memphis, Tennessee, U.S.
- Party: Republican (after 2004)
- Other political affiliations: Democratic (before 2004)
- Spouse: Jean Hutchinson
- Relations: Wall Doxey (grandfather)
- Children: 4

Ralph Hindman Doxey (born December 7, 1950) is an American attorney and politician, who served in the Mississippi Senate who represented the 2nd district which encompasses Benton, Marshall and Tippah counties from 2004 to 2008.

== Early life and education ==
Ralph Hindman Doxey was born on December 7, 1950, in Memphis, Tennessee. He is a grandson of Wall Doxey, who was a U. S. Senator from Mississippi. He graduated from the University of Mississippi with a B.B.A. and from the university's law school with a J.D. Doxey is affiliated with Phi Delta Theta, Delta Sigma Pi and Phi Alpha Delta. He is a member of Ducks Unlimited and the National Rifle Association.

== Politics ==
Doxey served as a member of the Mississippi House of Representatives from 1976 until 1988. In 2003, Doxey was elected to the Senate, where he was chairman of the Corrections Committee and vice chairman of the Judiciary, Division A committee. He also served on the Fees, Salaries & Administration; Finance; Highways & Transportation and Labor committees. One year after being elected, he switched political parties (from Democrat to Republican). This was not a popular move with his constituency, where there had been a Democratic Senator since Reconstruction. He served there from 2004 until 2008, when he was defeated in the 2007 general election by Bill Stone, a Democrat from Ashland, Mississippi. In 2008, he was hired by Governor Haley Barbour to be the Senate Liaison to the Governor, where he still serves.

== Personal life ==
Doxey is married to Jean Hutchinson. They have four children. He is a Presbyterian.
