= McLaurin, Mississippi =

- Unincorporated community
- Location within the state of Mississippi
- Coordinates: 31°10′05″N 89°13′2″W
- Country: United States
- State: Mississippi
- County: Forrest
- Elevation: 354 ft (108 m)
- Time zone: UTC-6 (Central (CST))
  - Summer (DST): UTC-5 (CDT)
- GNIS feature ID: 693929

McLaurin is a small unincorporated community in Forrest County, Mississippi, United States.

== History ==
The town of McLaurin is named for General McLaurin, who was also the first president of the Gulf and Ship Island Railroad. At one time, McLaurin was the site of the largest sawmill in the country, becoming an important shipping site for masonite and pulp wood. The manager of the first sawmill in the area, Jim Barron, is buried in McLaurin Cemetery.

The population in 1900 was 300.

A post office operated under the name McLaurin from 1896 to 1974.

A historic landing field for aircraft is located south of the settlement.

The McLaurin Salt Dome is a salt dome named after the community.

== Education ==
- Forrest County Agricultural High School
- South Forrest Elementary School

== Infrastructure ==
=== Transportation ===
McLaurin is served by U.S. Route 49, a north–south corridor that runs through Arkansas and Mississippi.

=== Places of worship ===
- McLaurin United Methodist Church
- Morning Star Church
- Old Enon Church
- First Baptist Church of McLaurin
