= Thomas L. Bailey =

American politician

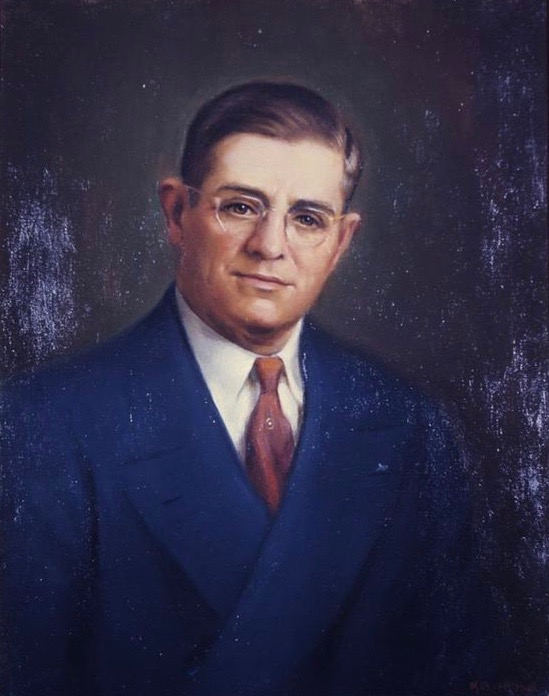

48th Governor of Mississippi
- In office January 18, 1944 – November 2, 1946
- Lieutenant: Fielding L. Wright
- Preceded by: Dennis Murphree
- Succeeded by: Fielding L. Wright

52nd Speaker of the Mississippi House of Representatives
- In office 1924–1936
- Preceded by: Mike Conner
- Succeeded by: Horace Stansel

Personal details
- Born: January 6, 1888 near Maben, Mississippi
- Died: November 2, 1946 (aged 58) Jackson, Mississippi
- Party: Democratic
- Spouse: Nellah Massey
- Profession: Lawyer

Thomas Lowry Bailey (January 6, 1888 – November 2, 1946) was an American politician from the state of Mississippi.

He was born in Webster County, Mississippi and graduated from Millsaps College. Bailey was elected to the Mississippi House of Representatives as a Democratic candidate in 1915 and served from 1916 to 1940. During his time in the legislature, Bailey supported benefits for seniors while also co-authoring a homestead exemption law. According to one observer, Bailey “had a reputation in the legislature as supporting progressive reforms for whites.” He unsuccessfully ran for governor in 1939 but was elected in 1943.

According to one study, Bailey “basically agreed with Governor Johnson's philosophy of government,” and during his tenure presided over numerous initiatives in areas such as social welfare, education, and rural life. Bailey helped in the development of roads and ways to help farmers sell their products. A four-year medical school at the University of Mississippi was also initiated.

Bailey was also (according to one source) “the leader of the pro-New Deal Democrats.”

He died of a stroke in Mississippi Governor's Mansion in 1946 aged 58, in Jackson during his term as governor. He was succeeded by Lieutenant Governor Fielding L. Wright.

Party political offices
| Preceded by Paul B. Johnson Sr. | Democratic nominee for Governor of Mississippi; 1943 | Succeeded by Fielding L. Wright |
Political offices
| Preceded by Dennis Murphree | Governor of Mississippi; 1944–1946 | Succeeded by Fielding L. Wright |
