= Paul B. Johnson Sr. =

American attorney, judge and politician (1880–1943)

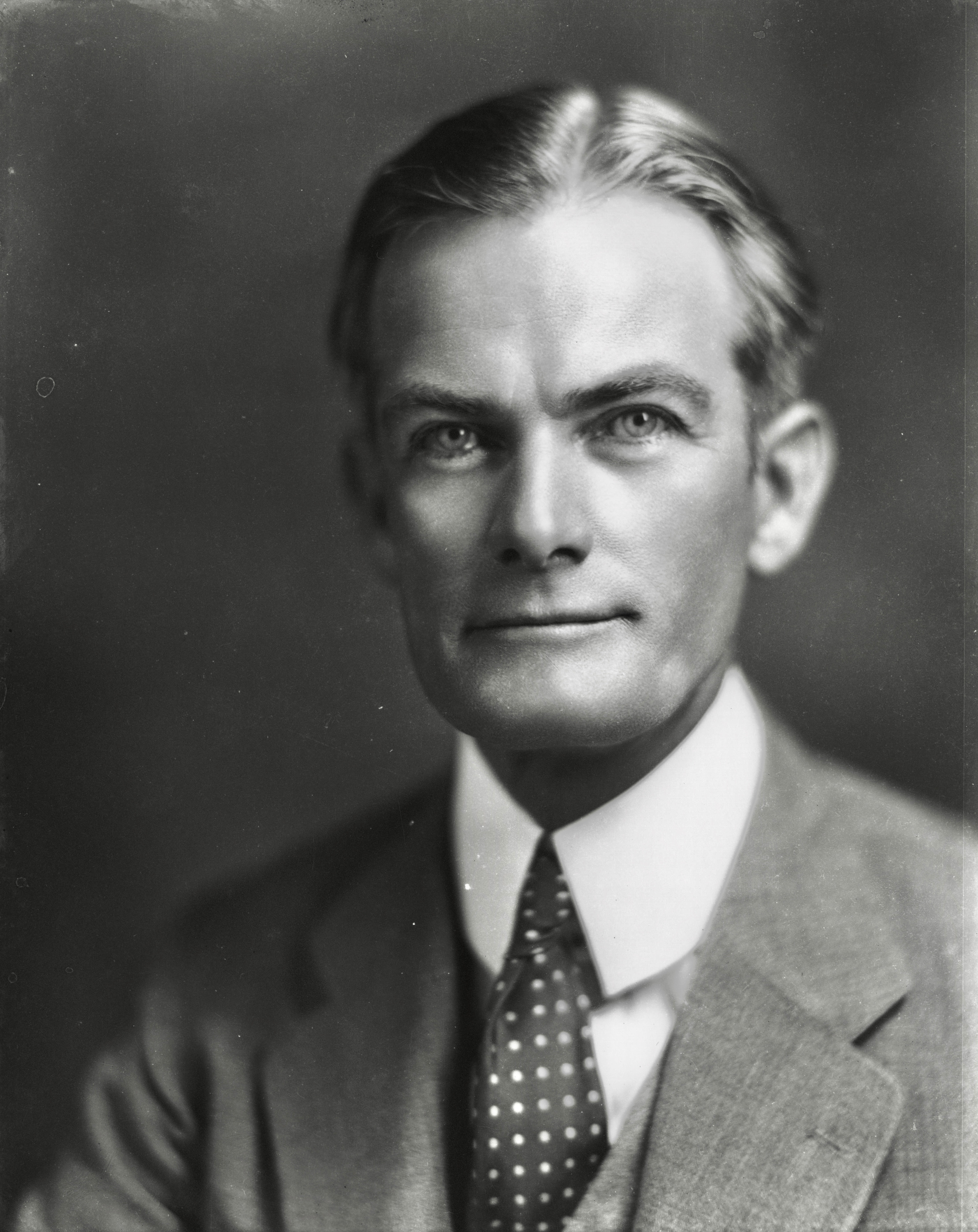

46th Governor of Mississippi
- In office January 16, 1940 – December 26, 1943
- Lieutenant: Dennis Murphree
- Preceded by: Hugh L. White
- Succeeded by: Dennis Murphree

Member of the U.S. House of Representatives from Mississippi's 6th district
- In office March 4, 1919 – March 3, 1923
- Preceded by: Pat Harrison
- Succeeded by: T. Webber Wilson

Personal details
- Born: Paul Burney Johnson; March 23, 1880 Hillsboro, Mississippi, U.S.
- Died: December 26, 1943 (aged 63) Hattiesburg, Mississippi, U.S.
- Party: Democratic
- Spouse: Corinne Venable
- Relations: Pete Johnson (grandson)
- Children: Paul B. Johnson Jr.
- Profession: Lawyer

Paul Burney Johnson Sr. (March 23, 1880 – December 26, 1943) was an American attorney, judge, and politician, serving as United States Representative from Mississippi, 1919–1923, and as Governor of Mississippi, 1940–1943.

== Early career ==
From 1907 to 1908 Johnson served as a judge of the city court of Hattiesburg, Mississippi. Two years later he became circuit judge of the 12th judicial district, with his tenure ending in 1919.

== Political career ==
In 1918 Johnson was elected to the U.S. House of Representatives as a Democrat, serving from 1919 to 1923. During this period, he developed a friendship with Franklin D. Roosevelt, Assistant Secretary of Navy and future President of the United States, and his family. Their children played together.

In 1939, Johnson won the race for Governor of Mississippi. A supporter of New Deal measures, Johnson presided over numerous progressive reforms during his tenure.

Johnson died in office in 1943. His son, Paul B. Johnson Jr., was serving in the Marines in the Pacific during World War II at the time. More than 20 years later, he was elected as governor in 1963. His grandson, Pete Johnson, was elected state auditor in 1988.

Paul B. Johnson State Park, a state park in Mississippi, is named after him.

Party political offices
| Preceded by Hugh L. White | Democratic nominee for Governor of Mississippi; 1939 | Succeeded by Thomas L. Bailey |
U.S. House of Representatives
| Preceded by Pat Harrison | Member of the U.S. House of Representatives from Mississippi's 6th congressional district 1919–1923 | Succeeded by T. Webber Wilson |
Political offices
| Preceded by Hugh L. White | Governor of Mississippi; 1940–1943 | Succeeded by Dennis Murphree |
