= Holly Springs =

Holly Springs is the name of some places in the United States of America:

- Holly Springs, Georgia
- Holly Springs, Mississippi
- Holly Springs, North Carolina
- Holly Springs Township, Wake County, North Carolina
- Holly Springs, Surry County, North Carolina
- Holly Springs, South Carolina
- Holly Springs National Forest
- Mount Holly Springs, Pennsylvania
