= 11th Field Artillery Regiment (PA) =

- Active: August 28, 1941 - April 9, 1942
- Disbanded: April 9, 1942
- Countries: United States of America; Philippines
- Allegiance: United States Army; Army of the Philippines
- Branch: Army
- Type: Field Artillery
- Role: Fire Support
- Size: 1,500
- Part of: 11th Infantry Division
- Garrison/HQ: Baguio, Benguet
- Equipment: M1916 75mm Howitzers; QF 2.95inch Mountain Guns
- Engagements: Philippines Campaign (1941-1942): Battle of Bataan; Delaying Action in Central Luzon

Commanders
- Notable commanders: Lieutenant Colonel James Hughes, USA

Insignia
- Identification symbol

11th Field Artillery Regiment, was a unit of 11th Infantry Division of the Philippine Army under the USAFFE, mobilized in August 1941 but was equipped in November, and was in action December 1941 to April 9, 1942. Division's area of responsibility covered Ilocos Norte, Ilocos Sur, La Union, Cordillera, Cagayan, and Isabela.

== Organization ==
The regiment was organized under I Military District and inducted to be part of USAFFE on August 28, 1941. It was part of the 11th Infantry Division under Brigadier General William Brougher, USA. Lieutenant Colonel James C. Hughes was appointed as commander.

Regiment was posted in both west and east coasts of Northern Luzon in support of the 12th Infantry and 13th Infantry who are respectively posted on Ilocos and Cagayan.

On December 8, 1941, the Japanese both landed in these coasts with 48th Division on West coast in La Union and 16th Division in Northeast Coast in Cagayan. The division fought a delaying actions until order came to withdraw and retreat to Bataan peninsula.

=== Into Bataan ===
11th Division was one of the last units to reached Bataan as it was still covering other units withdrawal in Guagua-Porac Line. Division and 11th FA fought a delaying action again in D-5 line Bamban-Arayat Line against Kanno Detachment. Now that it was 11th Division's turn to extricate and withdraw into Bataan. On January 1, 1942, General Brougher ordered his units to withdraw but Japanese almost already surrounded his division. With skillful maneuver the division escaped and reached San Fernando, Pampanga and proceeded to Bataan after all units were accounted. It was placed under I Corps area under Major Jonathan M. Wainwright and prepared to fight.

==== Mauban-Abucay Line ====
11th Division was posted at the western tip of the Mauban Line and 11th Field Artillery posted behind the Infantry units. On January 8, 1942, Japanese assaulted the line and although it fought valiantly it was forced to withdraw due to Japanese incursion in the gap created by Mt. Natib.

==== Orion-Bagac Line ====
The entire Bataan Force gave the Japanese a beating in this line and it was not penetrated after days of battle, Field Artillery was so accurate and dissipated Japanese units getting high casualties on their side. 11th Field Artillery contributed to this victory forcing General Homma Masaharu to withdraw his troops from engagements and request for reinforcement from Imperial Headquarters in Japan.

In April with fresh troops and new heavy artillery having arrived, General Masaharu Homma commenced its drive to Bataan and assaulted Orion-Bagac line again and this time was successful. Forcing Filipino and American troops retreat with heavy casualties due to combined air and artillery that rained the peninsula. Both fronts were disseminated and chaotic withdrawal and the Japanese continued its advances towards Mariveles, Bataan where they were met by a white flag. General Edward King went forward to ask for surrender terms and surrendered all his troops in Bataan.

11th Field Artillery surrendered and its soldiers became POWs, they were part of the Bataan Death March where casualties added to the list due to lack of water and food. The unit was disbanded and it was never reactivated after the war.
