= McWillie =

McWillie is a surname. Notable people with the surname include:

- Adam McWillie (1821–1861), United States Army and Confederate States Army officer
- William McWillie (1795–1869), American politician
