= Adam McWillie =

American military officer (1821–1861)

- Born: November 7, 1821; Camden, South Carolina, US
- Died: July 21, 1861 (aged 39) near Manassas, Virginia
- Burial place: near Manassas
- Education: South Carolina College
- Spouse: Lucy Ann Anderson McWillie
- Military career
- Allegiance: United States of America; Confederate States of America
- Branch: United States Army; Confederate States Army
- Rank: Captain
- Units: Mississippi Rifles; 18th Mississippi Infantry Regiment
- Conflicts: Mexican–American War; American Civil War: First Battle of Bull Run †
- Other work: Planter

Adam McWillie (November 7, 1821 – July 21, 1861) was a military captain in the Mexican–American War and also one for the Confederacy in the American Civil War.

== Biography ==
McWillie, born in Camden, South Carolina, was the son of the twenty-second Governor of Mississippi, William McWillie. He was educated at South Carolina College. Along with his father and his family, he moved to Madison County, Mississippi, in September 1845 and built "Kirkwood," the family's home. In June 1846, McWillie raised a company from Madison County to volunteer for service in the Mexican–American War. More than 17,000 Mississippians volunteered, but only 1,000 were called to serve in the First Mississippi Regiment under Colonel Jefferson Davis. In order to serve, Captain McWillie enlisted in the Mississippi Rifles as a private and fought as part of force that took Monterey in September 1846. When the Second Mississippi Regiment was formed under Reuben Davis, McWillie took command of the Camden Rifles and served out remainder of war, fighting at the Battle of Buena Vista. Following the Mexican-American War, McWillie returned to Kirkwood, where he was a planter.

In 1861 with the outbreak of the Civil War, he again raised the Camden Rifles, which became part of the 18th Mississippi Infantry Regiment under Col. E.R. Burt. The regiment arrived at Camp Walker, near Manassas, Virginia, on June 18, 1861, and, along with the 17th Mississippi and 5th South Carolina, was brigaded under Gen. David R. Jones. The brigade was on the extreme right of the Confederate army at Bull Run on July 21. Captain McWillie was killed by an enemy canister shot while rallying his command during an attack on the Union lines up Rocky Run. He was buried on the field alongside his nephew, Pvt. E.H. Anderson, who also was mortally wounded during the battle.
