= George M. Govan =

American military officer and politician

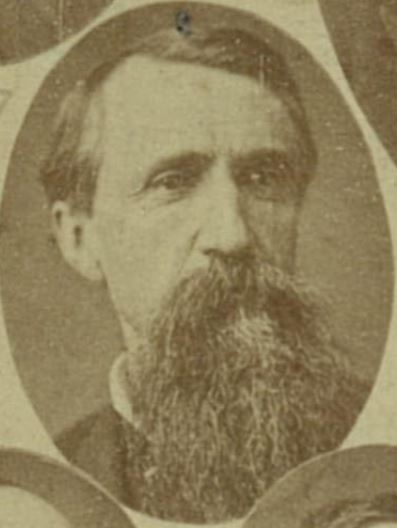
- c. 1884

27th Secretary of State of Mississippi
- In office January 14, 1886 – January 20, 1896
- Governor: Robert Lowry; John Marshall Stone
- Preceded by: Henry C. Myers
- Succeeded by: John Logan Power

Member of the Mississippi House of Representatives from the Pike County district
- In office January 1884 – January 1886

Personal details
- Born: October 30, 1840 Marshall County, MS
- Died: April 14, 1899 (aged 58) New Orleans, Louisiana
- Party: Democrat
- Spouse: Jane Edmondson (m. 1865)
- Children: 3
- Parent: Andrew R. Govan (father)

Military service
- Allegiance: Confederate States 1861-1865; United States 1898
- Branch/service: Army
- Years of service: 1861-1865, 1898
- Rank: Colonel
- Battles/wars: Civil War; Spanish-American War

George Morgan Govan (October 30, 1840 - April 14, 1899) was an American military officer and Democratic politician from Mississippi. He was the 27th Secretary of State of Mississippi, serving from 1886 to 1896.

== Early life ==
George Morgan Govan was born on October 30, 1840, in Marshall County, Mississippi. He was the son of Andrew R. Govan, who was born in Holly Springs, South Carolina and member of the United States House of Representatives. He was a first lieutenant, and later, a major, for the Confederacy in the Civil War. After the war, he returned to Marshall County to farm.

== Political career ==
He was the clerk of the Mississippi House of Representatives from 1876 to 1878. In 1884, Govan was a member of the Mississippi House of Representatives, representing Pike County. Govan was elected to be the Secretary of State of Mississippi as a Democrat in 1885 for the 1886–1890 term and was inaugurated on January 14, 1886. He was re-elected in 1889 and was re-inaugurated in 1890. The Mississippi Constitutional Convention of 1890 increased his term length from four to six years, making ten years of office in total. Govan was succeeded in the office by John Logan Power on January 20, 1896.

== Later life ==
In spring 1898, he was commissioned colonel of the First Mississippi Volunteers during the Spanish-American War. He served until later in that same year. He died in a hospital in New Orleans, Louisiana, on April 14, 1899.

== Personal life ==
Govan married Jane B. Edmondson in Elyton, Alabama, on February 26, 1865. They had three children together: Andrew R., Eliza, and John H.
