= Danville, Mississippi =

- Ghost town
- Location in Mississippi Location in the United States
- Coordinates: 34°49′30″N 88°32′17″W
- Country: United States
- State: Mississippi
- County: Alcorn
- Elevation: 472 ft (144 m)
- Time zone: UTC-6 (Central (CST))
  - Summer (DST): UTC-5 (CDT)
- GNIS feature ID: 706842

Danville is a ghost town in Alcorn County, Mississippi, United States.

The first non-Indian settlement in what was then Tishomingo County, Danville was destroyed by the Union Army during the American Civil War.

== History ==
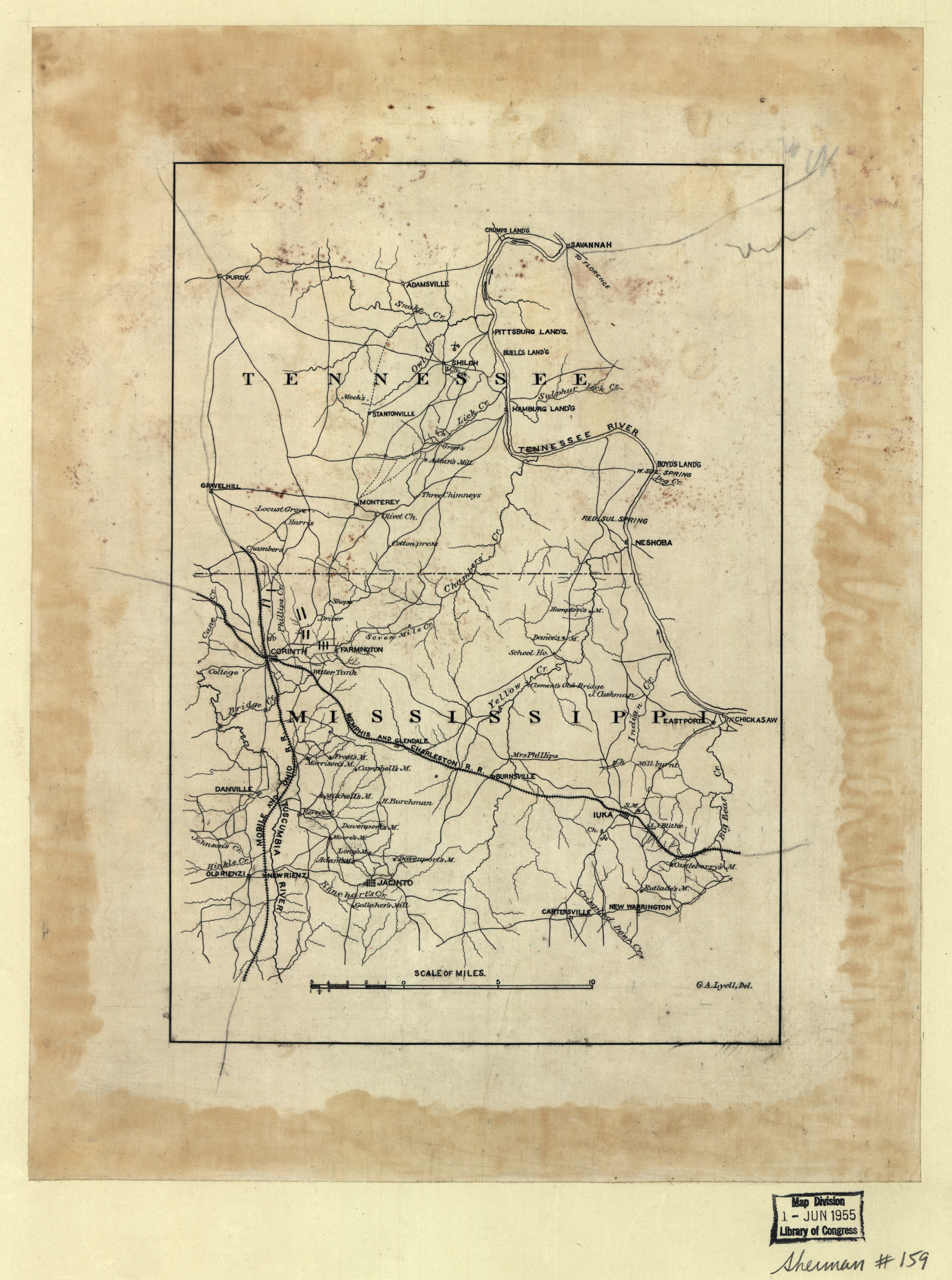
1862 map showing the location of Danville

The settlement was located along Reynoldsburg Road, which ran from a location near present-day Tupelo, Mississippi, north to Reynoldsburg in central Tennessee.

Originally called Troy, the settlement was located in Tishomingo County (Alcorn County was not formed until 1870).

Troy was the first non-Indian settlement in Tishomingo County, and was founded by John Rives and Mr. Fitz, who opened a store there.

Troy had an abundance of freestone water, which enabled a tannery, and a licensed whisky distillery, to establish there.

The first circuit court in Tishomingo County was held in a small log house in Troy.

In 1838, the New Hope Presbyterian Church was organized in a schoolhouse near Troy. The church cemetery, now called Old Danville Cemetery, has markers dating to the 1830s.

The settlement was renamed "Danville" when the post office was established, because a post office named Troy already existed in Mississippi.

Danville was incorporated in 1848.

The population reached a peak of 150, and Danville had blacksmith shops, four or five businesses, a two-story inn, a Masonic Temple, a school, an Indian trading post, and several saloons.

== Decline and destruction ==
Prior to the Civil War, the Mobile and Ohio Railroad was completed to the nearby towns of Corinth and Rienzi, undermining Danville's early prosperity and leading some Danville businesses to move to the new railway towns.

During the Civil War, the Union Army needed timber to erect a stockade and soldiers' quarters at Camp Davis, located about 3 mi (4.8 km) north of Danville, across the Tuscumbia River. Danville was shelled and its residents told to leave, after which its log homes and buildings were dismantled and moved to Camp Davis.

Danville still had a post office by the early 1900s, though nothing was left of the settlement.

== Notable people ==
- A. B. Dilworth, member of the Mississippi House of Representatives (1846–50), Secretary of State of Mississippi (1855-60), and State Auditor of Mississippi (1861–62).
- Cody Fowler, member of the Mississippi House of Representatives.
