= Andrew R. Govan =

American politician

Andrew Robison Govan

Member of the U.S. House of Representatives from South Carolina's 4th district
- In office December 4, 1822 – March 3, 1827
- Preceded by: James Overstreet
- Succeeded by: William D. Martin

Member of the South Carolina House of Representatives
- In office 1820 – 1821

Personal details
- Born: January 13, 1794 Orangeburg District, South Carolina
- Died: June 27, 1841 (aged 47) Marshall County, Mississippi
- Resting place: Marshall County, Mississippi
- Party: Democratic-Republican
- Other political affiliations: Jacksonian
- Children: George M. Govan
- Education: South Carolina College
- Profession: lawyer

Andrew Robison Govan (January 13, 1794 – June 27, 1841) was an American who served as a U.S. representative from South Carolina from 1822 to 1827.

== Biography ==
Born in Orange Parish, Orangeburg District, South Carolina, Govan pursued classical studies at a private school in Willington, South Carolina. He graduated from South Carolina College at Columbia in 1813. He served as member of the State house of representatives 1820–1821.

=== Congress ===
Govan was elected as a Democratic-Republican to the Seventeenth Congress to fill the vacancy caused by the death of James Overstreet.

Govan was elected as a Jackson Republican to the Eighteenth Congress, and reelected as a Jacksonian to the Nineteenth Congress, and served from December 4, 1822, to March 3, 1827.

=== After Congress ===
He moved to Mississippi in 1828 and devoted the remainder of his life to planting.

=== Death and burial ===
He died in Marshall County, Mississippi, June 27, 1841. He was interred in the family cemetery on the estate, "Snowdown" plantation in Marshall County.

He was the father of George M. Govan (1840-1899), who was the 27th Secretary of State of Mississippi, serving from 1886 to 1896.

== Sources ==
- United States Congress. "Andrew R. Govan (id: G000346)". Biographical Directory of the United States Congress.

U.S. House of Representatives
Preceded by James Overstreet	Member of the U.S. House of Representatives from South Carolina's 4th congressional district 1822–1827	Succeeded by William D. Martin
