= 11th Division (Philippines) =

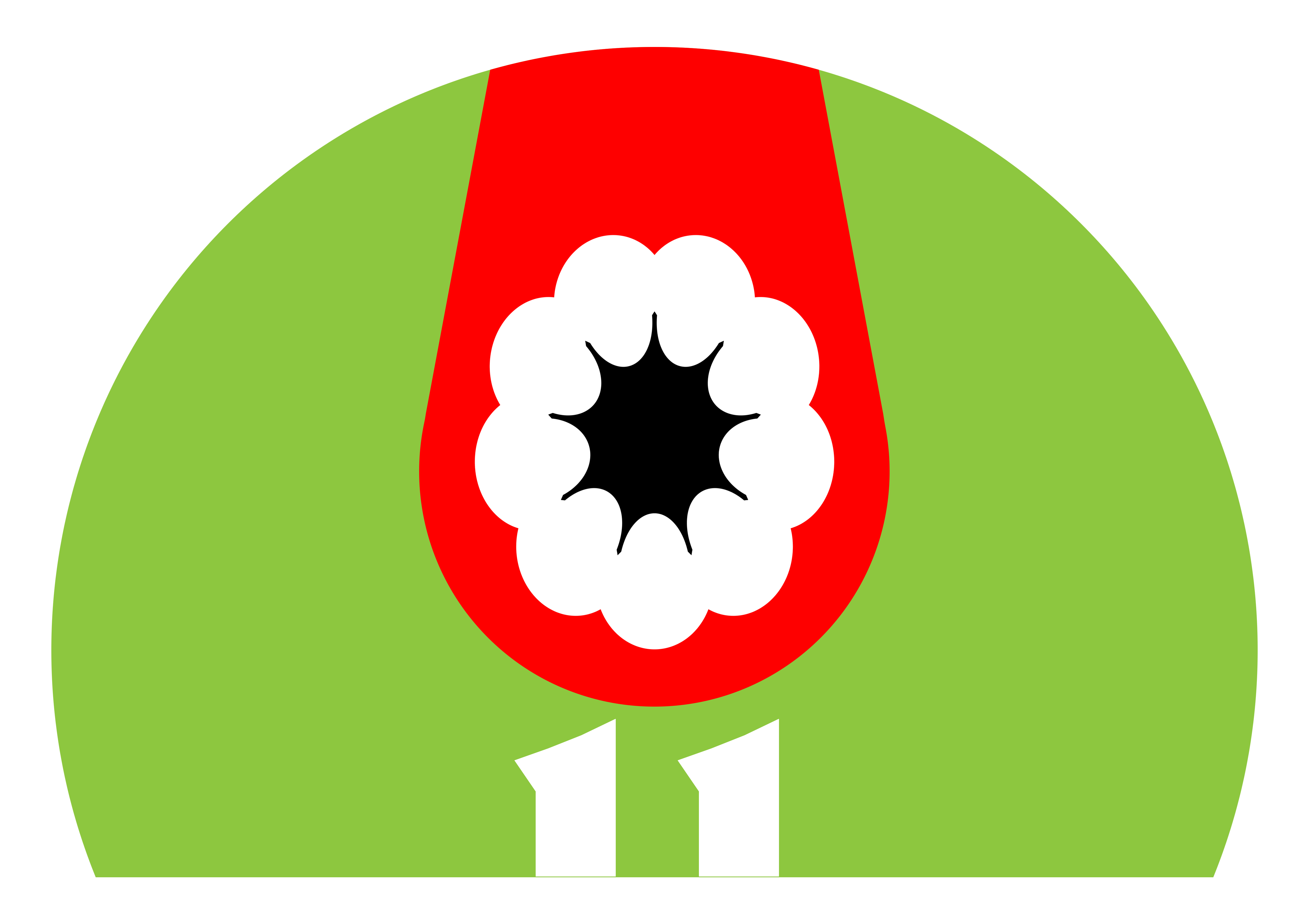
- 11th Philippine Division Emblem 1941-42
- Active: 1941 - 9 April 1942
- Country: Commonwealth of the Philippines
- Allegiance: United States Army; Philippine Commonwealth Army
- Branch: Philippine Army
- Type: Infantry Division
- Size: Division
- Part of: North Luzon Force (I Philippine Corps)
- Garrison/HQ: Camp O'Donnell, Capas, Tarlac
- Engagements: World War II: Battle of Bataan; Philippines campaign (1941–1942)

Commanders
- Commander: BGen William E. Brougher
- Chief of Staff: LCol. Donald Blackburn; LCol.Juan Moran
- Notable commanders: BGen William E. Brougher

Insignia
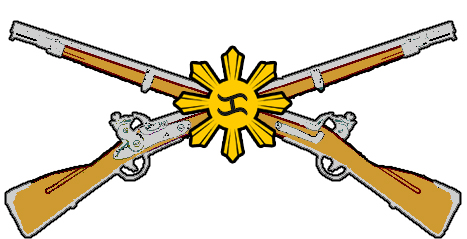
- Identification symbol

The 11th Infantry Division was one the reserve division of the Philippine Army that was mobilized in September 1941 under the United States Army Forces in the Far East (USAFFE).

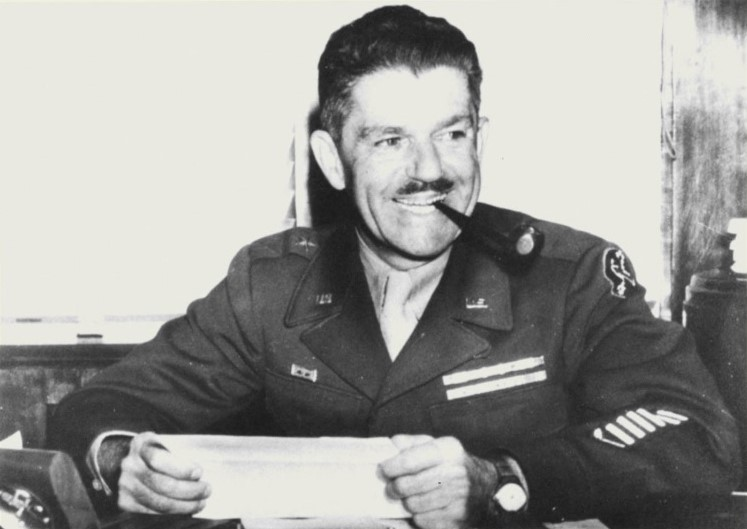
Colonel (later BGen.) William Brougher was appointed to command the division.

== History ==
It operated from 1941 to April 9, 1942, when Bataan fell, and then it gave up. It was organized and trained in Zambales Province of Northern Luzon. Col. (later BGen.) William E. Brougher (USA) was the division's commander.

=== Combat Narrative ===
At the opening of hostilities, 8 December 1941, the 11th Division formed a part of BGen. (later LGen.) Jonathan M. Wainwright's North Luzon Force of the Philippine Army (later renamed I Philippine Corps), alongside the 21st, 31st, 71st Divisions, 86th Field Artillery Battalion (PS), US Provisional Light Tank Group and the 26th Cavalry Regiment.

11th Division was posted south of Lingayen Gulf to oppose Japanese landings and posted reinforced battalion in Cagayan province opposing .

==== Withdrawal to Bataan ====
As WPO 3 was implemented by USAFFE headquarters 11th Division was ordered to withdraw to Bataan peninsula. It started its movement in midnight of January 5,1942, reaching and completed on January 6, 1942. It was posted in eastern sector of the peninsula under the command II Philippine Corps.

===== Guerilla Activities =====
Isolated units after the withdrawal to Bataan were consolidated in Cordilleras 1/13th Infantry under Capt Everett Warner, 2/71st Infantry under Capt Guillermo Nakar, Troop C, 26th Cavalry (PS) under Captain Ralph Preager. Warner, Nakar, and Capt. Manuel Enriquez 11th Division's G2 formed the unit continue to harassed Japanese line communication line and started guerilla warfare in Northern Luzon. After establishing communication with USAFFE headquarters, General MacArthur designated the unit 14th Infantry Regiment and promoted the Warner, Nakar, and Enriquez to Majors. Unit was initially commanded by Warner but he was unaccounted later, Major Enriquez later surrendered and the command fell to Major Nakar.

==== Surrender ====
In April 9,1942, Bataan Defense Force was surrendered by MGen. Edward P. King Jr and 11th Division soldiers were forced to walk from Mariveles, Bataan to San Fernando, Pampanga under the heat of the sun without food and water. Cramped into a trainbox and brought Camp O'Donnell in Capas, Tarlac. More soldiers died in the POW camp as no medicines are available.

In August 1942, Filipino soldiers were released and American soldiers are brought to different POW camp in the country and those healthier ones was brought to Manchuria or Japan.

== Order of Battle ==
- 11th Infantry Regiment (PA) (Col. Glen R. Townsend, Inf.)
  - 1st Battalion - Major Eulogo Balao
  - 2nd Battalion - Major Helmert J. Duisterhof
  - 3rd Battalion - Major Russell W. Volckmann
- 12th Infantry Regiment (PA) (LCol. John W. Primrose)
  - 1st Battalion - LCol. Martin Moses
  - 2nd Battalion - LCol. Arthur Noble
  - 3rd Battalion - Capt. Paulino Ventura
- 13th Infantry Regiment (PA) (LCol. Gaylord Phipps)
  - 1st Battalion
  - 2nd Battalion
  - 3rd Battalion
- 11th Field Artillery Regiment (PA) (Col. James C. Hughes, FA)
  - 11th FA Regt HQ Company (PA)
  - 1st Bn/11th FA Regt (PA) (75mm guns, 16x)
  - 2nd Bn/11th FA Regt (PA) (2.95-inch pack howitzers, 8x)
  - 3rd Bn/11th FA Regt (PA)
- 11th Engineer Battalion (PA)
- 11th Medical Battalion (PA)
- 11th Division Units (PA) - LCol. Martin Moses, USA
  - 11th Division Headquarters & HQ Company (PA)
  - 11th Medical Battalion (PA)
  - 11th Signal Company (PA)
  - 11th Quartermaster Company (Motorized) (PA)
  - 11th QM Transport Company (Truck) (PA)

== Notable members ==
- Eulogio Balao, became AFP Vice Chief of Staff, Secretary of National Defense, and later Senator.
- Guillermo Nakar, organized guerilla unit in East Central Luzon but was captured and executed by the Japanese in 1943.
- Martin Moses - Organized and first commanded USAFIP-NL guerilla force.
- Russell Volckman - succeeded Colonel Moses in commanding USAFIP-guerilla force until end of war, later became a general in US Army. Along with Bank and Fertig they founded US Army Special Forces.
- Leoncio Tan - Commanding General, Philippine Army 1954 - 1956

== Sources ==
- Morton, Louis (1953). United States Army in World War II, The War in the Pacific: The Fall of the Philippines. Washington, D.C.: Center of Military History, United States Army.
- Whitman, John W. (1990). Bataan: Our Last Ditch : The Bataan Campaign, 1942. Hippocrene Books. ISBN 0-87052-877-7.

== Bibliography ==
- Morton, Louis. The Fall of the Philippines (Publication 5-2) . Retrieved on 14 Feb 2017.
