= D. P. Porter =

American lawyer and politician

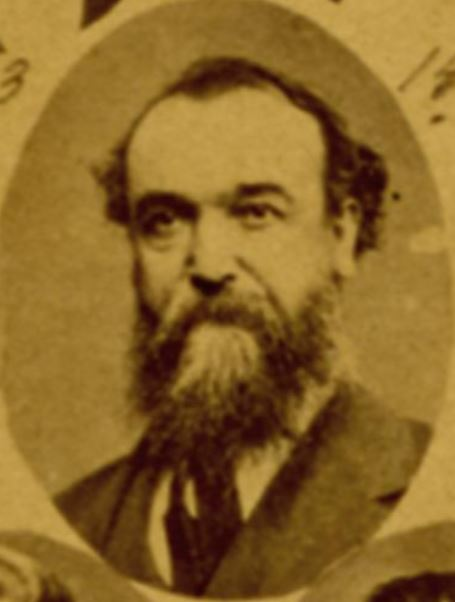
- Porter in 1876

25th Secretary of State of Mississippi
- In office September 25, 1878 – November 15, 1878
- Governor: John M. Stone
- Preceded by: Kinloch Falconer
- Succeeded by: Henry C. Myers

Personal details
- Born: 1835 Hinds County, MS
- Died: June 24, 1899 (aged 64) Jackson, Hinds County, MS
- Party: Democrat
- Children: 6

Daniel Price Porter (1835 – June 24, 1899) was a Mississippi lawyer and politician, and the 25th Secretary of State of Mississippi, serving temporarily in late 1878. He was a Democrat.

== Biography ==
Daniel Price Porter was born in 1835 near Raymond in Hinds County, Mississippi. When he was 24 years old, he was admitted to the bar and started practicing law in Jackson. In 1863, he was appointed to the position of Secretary of the Mississippi State Senate, serving until after 1875. After the death of incumbent Kinloch Falconer, Porter was appointed to temporarily be the Secretary of State of Mississippi on September 25, 1878. He stopped being the Secretary of State after the appointment of Henry C. Myers on November 15, 1878. He then served as the Deputy Secretary of State of Mississippi, serving part of two terms under secretaries Myers and Govan. In 1893, president Grover Cleveland appointed him to be the postmaster at Jackson. He was in this position from 1893 to 1897. He died in his house in Jackson, Mississippi at 10:30 PM on June 24, 1899, aged 64. Oliver Clifton and Ramsey Wharton were pallbearers at his funeral.

== Personal life ==
Porter was a Freemason and Odd Fellow. Porter married Kate Hobson, the daughter of Richard Hobson. They had six children: D. Price Jr, Joseph, McGee, Kate, George, and William, of whom the first four survived him.
