= John Logan Power =

Irish-American politician and publisher

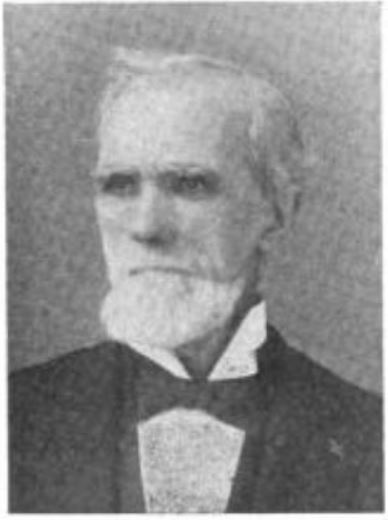

28th Secretary of State of Mississippi
- In office January 20, 1896 – September 24, 1901
- Governor: Anselm J. McLaurin; Andrew H. Longino
- Preceded by: George M. Govan
- Succeeded by: Joseph Withers Power

Personal details
- Born: March 1, 1834 Mullinahone, Tipperary, Ireland
- Died: September 24, 1901 (aged 67) Jackson, Mississippi, United States
- Party: Democrat
- Children: Joseph Withers Power, others

John Logan Power (March 1, 1834 - September 24, 1901) was an Irish-born American politician and publisher, and the Secretary of State of Mississippi from 1896 until his death.

== Biography ==
John Logan Power was born on March 1, 1834, in Mullinahone, Munster, Ireland. His father died when he was young. He came to the United States in 1850. He moved to Lockport, New York, and then, in 1855, to Jackson, Mississippi. He enlisted as a private in the Confederate Army in 1862, and was a colonel when the Civil War ended. In 1866, he established the Daily Mississippi Standard newspaper, which became a precursor of the Clarion-Ledger. In 1867, he was the clerk of the Mississippi House of Representatives. He was elected to become the Secretary of State of Mississippi in November 1895, and assumed the position on January 20, 1896. He was re-elected in 1899. He continued serving until his death, at 12:30 AM on September 24, 1901, in Jackson, Mississippi.

== Personal life ==
He married Jane Wilkinson in 1857. Their son, Joseph Withers Power, succeeded John as the Secretary of State of Mississippi.
