= Lewis Sperry =

American politician (1848–1922)

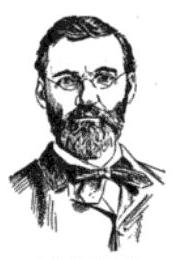

Member of the U.S. House of Representatives from Connecticut's 1st district
- In office March 4, 1891 – March 3, 1895
- Preceded by: William E. Simonds
- Succeeded by: E. Stevens Henry

Personal details
- Born: January 23, 1848 South Windsor, Connecticut
- Died: June 22, 1922 (aged 74) South Windsor, Connecticut
- Party: Democratic

Lewis Sperry (January 23, 1848 – June 22, 1922) was a United States representative from Connecticut. He was born at East Windsor Hill, South Windsor, Connecticut. He attended the district school and Monson Academy, Monson, Massachusetts and was graduated from Amherst College, Massachusetts in 1873. He studied law and was admitted to the bar in March 1875 and commenced practice in Hartford, Connecticut.

Sperry was a member of the Connecticut House of Representatives in 1876. Later, he was elected as a Democrat to the Fifty-second and Fifty-third Congresses (March 4, 1891 - March 3, 1895). He was an unsuccessful candidate for reelection in 1894 to the Fifty-fourth Congress. After Congress, he again resumed the practice of his profession in Hartford, Connecticut. He died at East Windsor Hill, town of South Windsor, Connecticut in 1922 and was buried in South Windsor Cemetery.

U.S. House of Representatives
Preceded by William E. Simonds	Member of the U.S. House of Representatives from Connecticut's 1st congressional district 1891-1895	Succeeded by E. Stevens Henry
