= Walker Wood =

American journalist and politician

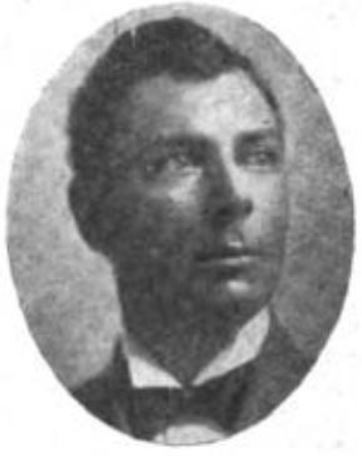
- c. 1907

30th Secretary of State of Mississippi
- In office April 7, 1926 – January 1948
- Governor: Henry L. Whitfield; Dennis Murphree; Theodore G. Bilbo; Martin Sennet Conner; Hugh L. White; Paul B. Johnson Sr. Thomas L. Bailey; Fielding L. Wright
- Preceded by: Joseph Withers Power
- Succeeded by: Heber Austin Ladner

Member of the Mississippi House of Representatives from the Tate County district
- In office January 1908 – January 1912

Personal details
- Born: April 23, 1874 Vicksburg, Mississippi
- Died: February 3, 1957 (aged 82) Jackson, Mississippi
- Party: Democrat

Walker Wood (April 23, 1874 - February 3, 1957) was an American journalist and politician from Mississippi. He was the 30th Secretary of State of Mississippi, serving from 1926 to 1948.

== Early life ==
Walker Wood was born on April 23, 1874, in Vicksburg, Mississippi. He was the son of William Menefee Wood and Josephine (Kendrick) Wood. He was educated in the public schools in the Vicksburg area.

== Newspapers ==
At the age of eighteen, he began a career in journalism. He was in charge of the Oxford Eagle from 1892 until he purchased the Senatobia Democrat and started being the editor of that newspaper in 1899. He edited the Winona Times until 1940.

== Political career ==
A Democrat, Wood was elected to the Mississippi House of Representatives representing Tate County in 1907 for the 1908-1912 term. On April 7, 1926, he was appointed to the position of Secretary of State of Mississippi by Governor Whitfield after the death of Joseph Withers Power. In 1935, he defeated former State Auditor Joe S. Price for re-election. In 1945, he was the president of the National Association of Secretaries of State. He stopped being the Secretary of State of Mississippi in 1948. He was the president of the Mississippi State Microfilm Department from 1950 until his retirement in December 1956.

== Death ==
Wood died after a long illness on February 3, 1957, in a hospital in Jackson, Mississippi. He was survived by his wife and two daughters.

== Personal life ==
Wood married Susie Garrott Meacham on February 19, 1902. They had at least three children, Olivia Elizabeth Wood, George Meacham Wood, and another daughter. Wood was a Methodist.

Party political offices
Preceded by Joseph Withers Power	Democratic nominee for Secretary of State of Mississippi; 1927, 1931, 1935, 1939, 1943	Succeeded by Heber Austin Ladner
