= A. B. Dilworth =

American farmer, politician, and military officer

Member of the Mississippi House of Representatives from the Tishomingo County district
- In office 1846–1850

13th Secretary of State of Mississippi
- In office January 10, 1855 – January 1860
- Governor: John J. McRae; William McWillie; John J. Pettus
- Preceded by: William H. Muse
- Succeeded by: B. R. Webb

12th State Auditor of Mississippi
- In office 1861–1862
- Governor: John J. Pettus
- Preceded by: Erasmus Burt
- Succeeded by: A. J. Gillespie

Personal details
- Born: December 14, 1814 Rockingham County, North Carolina
- Died: July 2, 1894 (aged 79)
- Resting place: John Dilworth Cemetery, Alcorn County, Mississippi; 34°49′34.09″N 88°35′9.81″W
- Party: Mississippi Democratic Party

Andrew Boyd Dilworth (December 14, 1814 – July 2, 1894) was an American farmer, politician, and military officer.

== Biography ==
Dilworth was born in Rockingham County, North Carolina.

During the 1830s, Dilworth worked in an official government capacity in Corinth, Mississippi. He then returned to Rockingham County, where he convinced his father and uncle to purchase farmland available near Corinth. The family moved to nearby Danville in 1837 or 1838.

Dilworth was elected to the Mississippi House of Representatives, and served as a Democrat from 1846-1850, representing Tishomingo County (this part of Tishomingo County became part of the newly created Alcorn County in 1870). Dilworth served as Secretary of State of Mississippi from January 1855 to January 1860, and as State Auditor of Mississippi from 1861 to 1862.

Dilworth oversaw the construction of the Jacinto Courthouse, completed in 1854, in Jacinto, Mississippi.

During the American Civil War, Dilworth served as Quartermaster General in the Confederate States Army. Stationed in Iuka, Mississippi, Dilworth is noted for negotiating the release of Confederate prisoners from Camp Douglas in Chicago. Dilworth was also responsible for signing paper currency and financial vouchers during the war.

Dilworth died on July 2, 1894, and is buried in John Dilworth Cemetery, south of Corinth. A historic plaque in his honor is located there.
