= 1837 Mississippi gubernatorial election =

- November 6, 1837
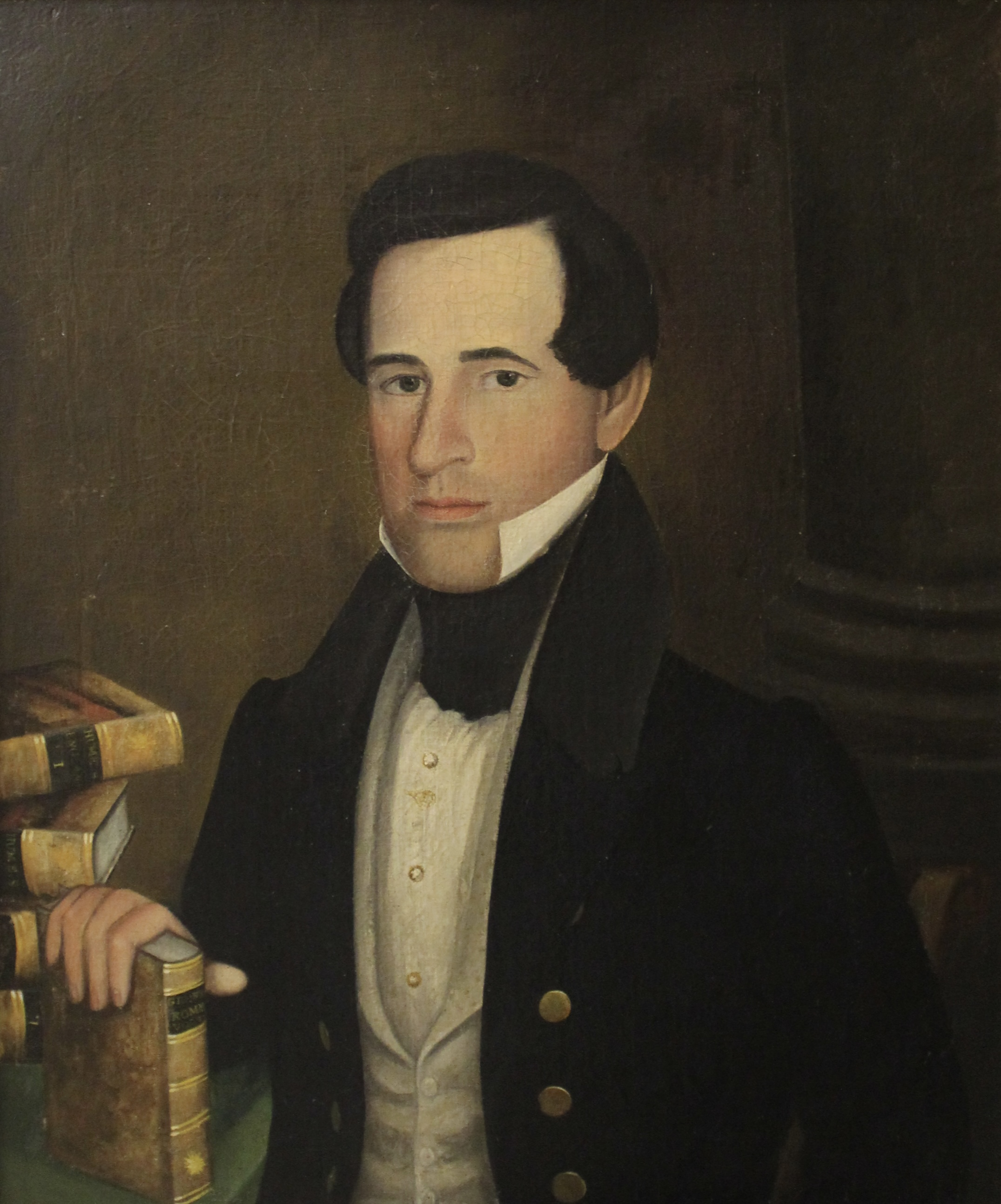

Nominee	Alexander G. McNutt	Jacob B. Morgan	John A. Grimball
Party	Democratic	Whig	Whig
Popular vote	12,936	9,896	4,974
Percentage	46.52%	35.59%	17.89%
- County results McNutt: 50–60% 60–70% 70–80% 80–90% >90% Morgan: 40–50% 50–60% 60–70% 70–80% Grimball: 40–50% 50–60% 60–70% 70–80%
Governor before election
Charles Lynch
Whig
Elected Governor
Alexander G. McNutt
Democratic

The 1837 Mississippi gubernatorial election was held on November 6, 1837, to elect the governor of Mississippi. Alexander G. McNutt, a Democrat won against Whig candidate John A. Grimball and States Rights Whig candidate Jacob B. Morgan. A fourth candidate, Democrat Benjamin W. Edwards died during the campaign.

== Results ==
Mississippi gubernatorial election, 1837
Party	Candidate	Votes	%
Democratic	Alexander G. McNutt	12,936	46.52%
Whig	Jacob B. Morgan	9,896	35.59%
Whig	John A. Grimball	4,974	17.89%
Total votes		27,806	100.00
Democratic gain from Whig			
