= Kinloch Falconer =

American politician (1838–1878)

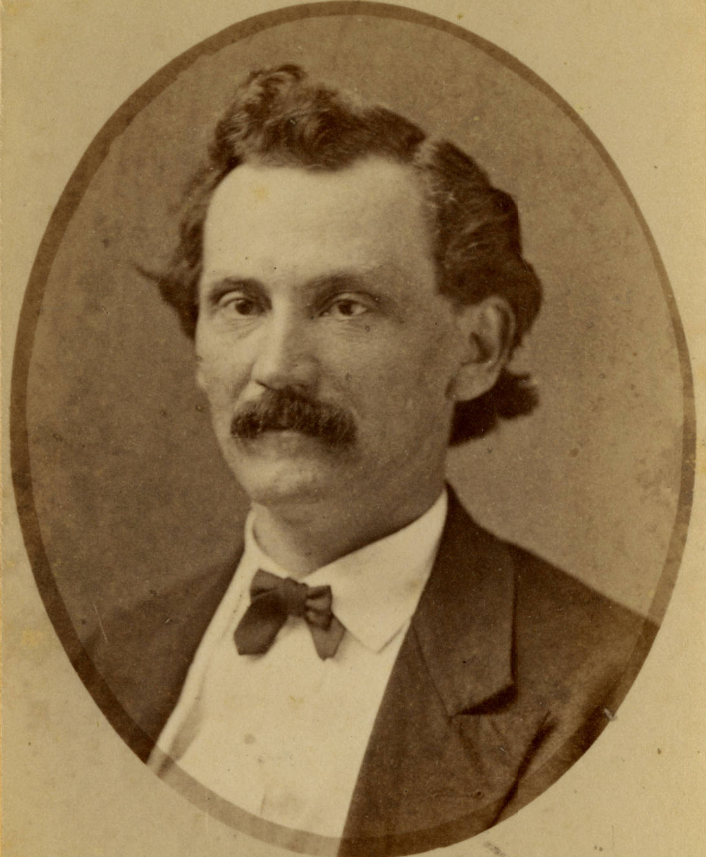
- Falconer, c. 1867

24th Secretary of State of Mississippi
- In office January 1, 1878 – September 23, 1878
- Governor: John Marshall Stone
- Preceded by: James Hill
- Succeeded by: D. P. Porter

Personal details
- Born: October 28, 1838
- Died: September 23, 1878 (aged 39) Holly Springs, Mississippi, US
- Party: Democratic
- Relations: Thomas A. Falconer (father); Howard Falconer (brother)

Kinloch Falconer (or Kinlock; October 28, 1838 – September 23, 1878) was an American newspaper editor, military officer, and lawyer, who served as the 24th Mississippi Secretary of State.

== Biography ==
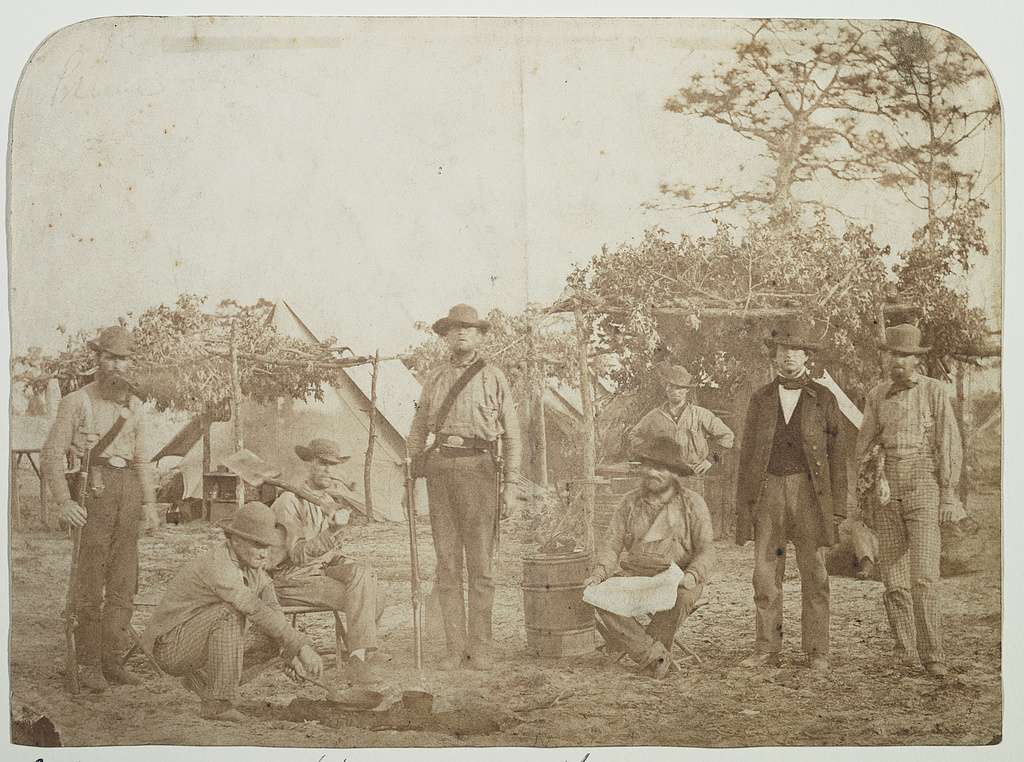
Troops of Company B, 9th Mississippi Infantry in camp at Pensacola, Florida, 1861. Falconer is second from left.

Falconer was born on October 28, 1838. He was the son of Colonel Thomas A. Falconer. He had a brother, Howard, who later became a member of the Mississippi House of Representatives. He graduated from the University of Mississippi in 1860 and was a member of the Delta Kappa Epsilon fraternity. After graduating, he worked at his father's newspaper, the Southern Herald, in Holly Springs.

During the American Civil War, he enlisted in the 9th Mississippi Infantry Regiment on March 27, 1861, as a private. He was transferred to a clerk position, then was promoted to the rank of major. By the time he retired from the military, he was Assistant Adjutant General of Tennessee.

Following the war, Falconer and his brother Howard set up a law practice in Holly Springs, Mississippi, the town in which they resided. His home was known as White Pillars and a postcard was made of it. The University of Mississippi Libraries have a collection of his papers.

On November 6, 1877, Falconer was elected as a Democrat to the position of Secretary of State of Mississippi. He assumed the position on January 1, 1878. During the Lower Mississippi Valley yellow fever epidemic of 1878, Falconer returned to Holly Springs to nurse his father and brother. He then buried them after they died of the fever. Soon after, Falconer died there, on September 23, 1878, aged 39, also of yellow fever.
