= Samuel Stamps =

American politician

9th Secretary of State of Mississippi
- In office January 1847 – March 22, 1850
- Preceded by: Wilson Hemingway
- Succeeded by: Joseph Bell

Personal details
- Born: October 19, 1795 Hancock County, Georgia, U.S.
- Died: March 22, 1850 (aged 54) Jackson, Mississippi, U.S.
- Party: Democratic

Samuel Stamps (October 19, 1795 - March 22, 1850) was an American Democratic politician. He was the 9th Secretary of State of Mississippi, serving from 1847 until his death.

== Biography ==
Samuel Stamps was born on October 19, 1795, in Hancock County, Georgia. He was a member of the Democratic party. Stamps became the Secretary of State of Mississippi in January 1847. While still serving as Secretary, he died on March 22 (or at the evening of March 21), 1850, at his residence in Jackson, Mississippi. He was succeeded as Secretary of State of Mississippi by Joseph Bell.
