= L. G. Galloway =

American politician

7th Secretary of State of Mississippi
- In office November 1841 – November 1843
- Preceded by: Thomas B. Woodward
- Succeeded by: Wilson Hemingway

Personal details
- Born: 1808 or 1809 Warren County, Mississippi, U. S.
- Died: January 1869 (aged 60) Memphis, Tennessee, U. S.
- Party: Whig
- Children: 2

Colonel Lewis G. Galloway (1808 or 1809 - January 1869) was an American politician. He was the 7th Secretary of State of Mississippi, serving from 1841 to 1843.

== Biography ==
Lewis (or Louis) G. Galloway was born in Warren County, Mississippi, but later lived in Holmes County, Mississippi. He was a member of the Whig Party. He attended the Whig Party Convention of Mississippi in January 1839. Galloway ran for Secretary of State of Mississippi in November 1841 against Thomas B. Woodward and D. O. Williams. He became the Secretary of State of Mississippi in November 1841. At the Whig Party Convention on June 12, 1843, Galloway was nominated for re-election. His tenure as Secretary of State of Mississippi ended in November 1843. He was succeeded by Wilson Hemingway.

Galloway died of dysentery in Memphis, Tennessee, aged 60 in January 1869. His funeral was held on January 26, 1869.

== Personal life ==
Galloway married Martha Dickinson, the daughter of lawyer David Dickinson, in Murfreesboro, Tennessee, on September 10, 1846. Through Martha's sister, Galloway was a brother-in-law of John Bell. Martha died before 1851. She was survived by two of her and Lewis's children; Lewis G. Galloway Jr. and David D. Galloway.
