= John A. Grimball =

American politician

2nd Secretary of State of Mississippi
- In office January 1821 – January 1833
- Preceded by: Daniel Williams
- Succeeded by: David Dickson

Personal details
- Died: September 25, 1867 Hinds County, Mississippi, U.S.
- Party: Whig

Colonel John Audebert Grimball (died September 25, 1867) was an American politician. He was the 2nd Secretary of State of Mississippi, serving from 1821 to 1833.

== Biography ==
John Audebert Grimball was one of six children of Thomas Grimball and Ann (Audebert) Grimball. In 1821, Grimball was elected by the Mississippi Legislature to succeed Daniel Williams as the Secretary of State of Mississippi after Williams's resignation. Grimball was re-elected on January 7, 1824; January 11, 1826; January 12, 1828; January 13, 1830; and December 1, 1831. In the 1837 Mississippi gubernatorial election, Grimball ran for the office of the Governor of Mississippi as a Whig, but lost to Democrat Alexander McNutt. Grimball died on September 25, 1867, in Hinds County, Mississippi.

== Personal life ==
Grimball married Eugenia Bray. Their daughter, Laura, married Taliaferro J. Lenoir in 1847.
