= Joseph Withers Power =

American politician

29th Secretary of State of Mississippi
- In office September 24, 1901 – April 5, 1926
- Governor: Andrew H. Longino; James K. Vardaman; Edmond Noel; Earl L. Brewer; Theodore G. Bilbo; Lee M. Russell; Henry L. Whitfield
- Preceded by: John Logan Power
- Succeeded by: Walker Wood

Personal details
- Born: March 2, 1867 Jackson, Mississippi
- Died: April 5, 1926 (aged 59) Jackson, Mississippi
- Party: Democrat
- Spouse: Eva Truly m. 1896-1926, his death
- Children: 3
- Parent: John Logan Power (father)

Joseph Withers Power (March 2, 1867 – April 5, 1926) was a Mississippi politician and the Secretary of State of Mississippi from 1901 to 1926.

== Early life ==
Joseph Withers Power was born on March 2, 1867, in Jackson, Mississippi. He was the son of Irish emigrant John Logan Power, who became the Mississippi Secretary of State from 1893 to 1901, and his wife, Elizabeth (Wilkinson) Power. J. W. Power attended public schools in Jackson. Then, he attended Southwestern Presbyterian University in Clarksville, Tennessee. After leaving school, he assisted his father in the publishing business and became a bookkeeper.

== Political career ==
When Joseph's father, John Logan Power, was the Secretary of State of Mississippi, he was an assistant in the office of the Secretary of State of Mississippi. After his father's death on September 23, 1901, Mississippi governor A. H. Longino appointed him Secretary of State of Mississippi. He was re-elected in 1903, 1907, and 1911. In 1923, he defeated Walker Wood in the primary election for the Democratic nomination to the office.

=== Death ===
While still the Secretary of State of Mississippi, Power died suddenly in Jackson on April 5, 1926. Walker Wood was appointed to the office finish the unfinished term.

== Personal life ==
Power was a Democrat, member of the Episcopal Church, Freemason, Odd Fellow, and a Knight of Pythias. In 1896, Power married Eva Truly (1868 or 1869 - 1947); her brother Jeff became an Associate Justice of the Supreme Court of Mississippi. The Powers had three children: Dorothy, Mary, and Josephine Jeffrey "Jo Jeff".
