= E. Stevens Henry =

American politician (1836–1921)

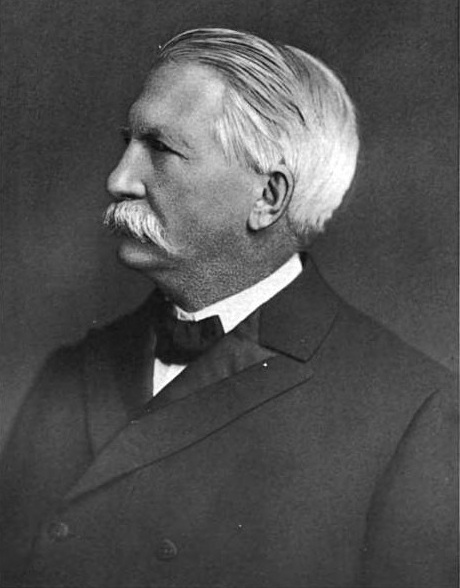

Member of the U.S. House of Representatives from Connecticut's 1st district
- In office March 4, 1895 – March 3, 1913
- Preceded by: Lewis Sperry
- Succeeded by: Augustine Lonergan

3rd Mayor of Rockville, Connecticut
- In office 1894-1895

44th Treasurer of Connecticut
- In office January 10, 1889 – January 4, 1893
- Governor: Morgan Bulkeley
- Preceded by: Alexander Warner
- Succeeded by: Marvin H. Sanger

Member of the Connecticut Senate
- In office 1887-1888

Member of the Connecticut House of Representatives
- In office 1883

Personal details
- Born: February 10, 1836 Gill, Massachusetts, US
- Died: October 10, 1921 (aged 85) Rockville, Connecticut, US
- Party: Republican

Edward Stevens Henry (February 10, 1836 – October 10, 1921) was an American businessman and politician from Connecticut who served as a Republican member of the United States House of Representative for Connecticut's 1st congressional district from 1895 to 1913. He also served as the 44th treasurer of Connecticut from 1889 to 1893, in the Connecticut House of Representatives and the Connecticut Senate, and as mayor of Rockville, Connecticut.

== Early life ==
Henry was born in the town of Gill, Massachusetts, the oldest of six children, and moved with his parents at age 13 to Rockville, Connecticut in 1849. He attended the public schools and at the age of 19 went into the dry-goods business. He was an organizer of the People's Saving Bank in Rockville and served as its treasurer from 1870 to 1921. He was also a farmer and breeder of livestock.

== Career ==
Henry served as a member of the Connecticut House of Representatives in 1883 and as a member of the Connecticut Senate from 1887 to 1888. He served as delegate at large to the Republican National Convention in 1888 and served as treasurer of the state of Connecticut from 1889 to 1893. During his time as state treasurer, he abolished the state tax. Following his term as treasurer, he served as the third mayor of Rockville from 1894 to 1895.

Henry was nominated by his party for Congressman in 1892 but lost to Democrat Lewis Sperry. In 1894 he was elected as a Republican to the 54th Congress and to the eight succeeding Congresses (March 4, 1895 – March 3, 1913). He served on the House Committee on Agriculture for much of his time in Congress, and served as chairman of the Committee on Expenditures on Public Buildings (60th and 61st Congresses). During his time in Congress, Henry was seen as a proponent of agriculture, a protectionist, and as a supporter of the gold standard, and he was one of 14 representatives, all Republicans, to oppose the Sixteenth Amendment to the United States Constitution, which imposed a federal income tax. He introduced the Oleomargarine Act, known as the Henry Bill, a law discouraging the imitation of butter. He declined to be a candidate for renomination in 1912.

He resumed his former mercantile pursuits in Rockville, Connecticut, where he died on October 10, 1921. He was interred in Grove Hill Cemetery.

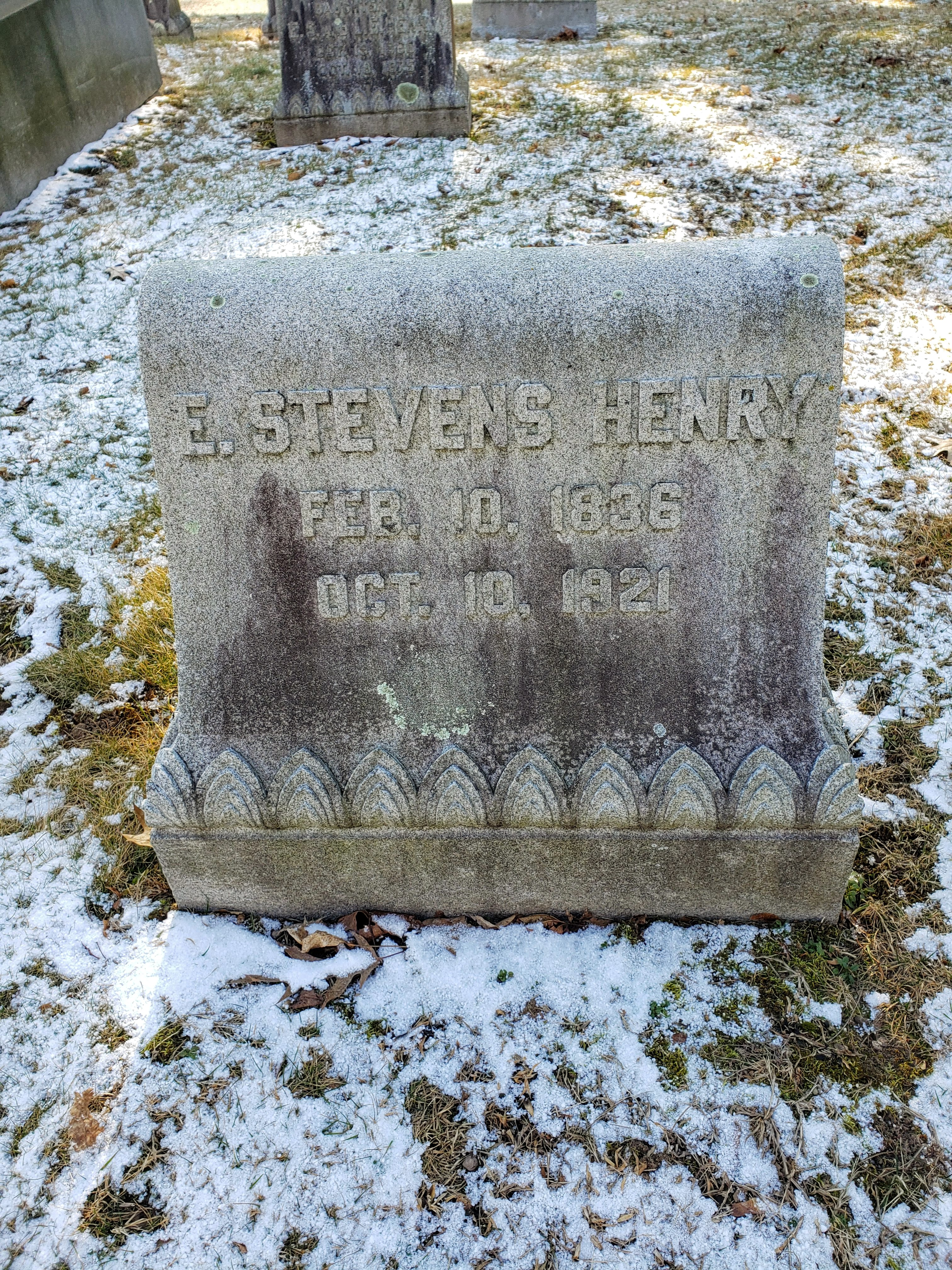
Edward Stevens Henry gravestone

== Legacy ==
Henry Park in Rockville, Connecticut, is located on land donated by Henry and named in his honor.

== Footnotes ==
Connecticut House of Representatives
| Preceded by | Member of the Connecticut House of Representatives; 1883 | Succeeded by |
Connecticut State Senate
| Preceded by | Member of the Connecticut Senate; 1887-1888 | Succeeded by |
U.S. House of Representatives
| Preceded by Lewis Sperry | Member of the U.S. House of Representatives from Connecticut's 1st congressional district 1895-1913 | Succeeded by Augustine Lonergan |
Political offices
| Preceded by Alexander Warner | Connecticut State Treasurer; 1889–1893 | Succeeded by Marvin H. Sanger |
| Preceded by | Mayor of Rockville, Connecticut; 1894–1895 | Succeeded by |
