= Henry C. Myers (Mississippi politician) =

American politician

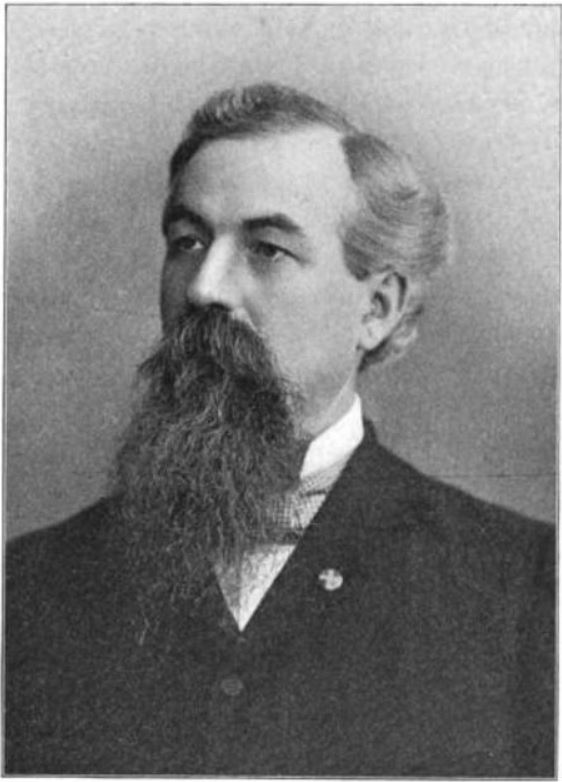

26th Secretary of State of Mississippi
- In office November 15, 1878 – January 14, 1886
- Governor: John M. Stone; Robert Lowry
- Preceded by: D. P. Porter
- Succeeded by: George M. Govan

Personal details
- Born: October 17, 1847 Wadesboro, North Carolina
- Died: August 19, 1917 (aged 69) Memphis, Tennessee
- Party: Democrat
- Spouse: Minnie Walter (m. 1873-1911, her death)
- Children: 1

Henry C. Myers (October 17, 1847 - August 19, 1917) was a Democratic Mississippi politician and the 26th Secretary of State of Mississippi, serving from 1878 to 1886.

== Early life ==
Henry C. Myers was born on October 17, 1847, in Wadesboro, North Carolina. He was the son of Absalom and Adeline (Boggan) Myers. He had 6 older brothers and 2 older half-brothers from his father's first marriage. Their names were, from oldest to youngest, George, Calvin, Absalom, Albert, Patrick, Martin, and William. When Henry was eight years old, he moved with his family to northern Mississippi. During the Civil War, all of his brothers and half-brothers fought for the Confederacy. In 1863, the 15-year-old Myers joined the (also Confederate) 2nd Missouri Regiment. He was paroled in May 1865. He then edited and published a newspaper called The South in Holly Springs. During Reconstruction, he was a member of the Ku Klux Klan.

== Political career ==
Myers held multiple political offices in Marshall County, Mississippi. On November 15, 1878, he was appointed Secretary of State of Mississippi as a Democrat to permanently fill in the vacancy left by the death of Kinloch Falconer (between Falconer's death and Myers' appointment, D. P. Porter was temporarily appointed). Myers was then elected to the position in November 1881, for the 1882-1886 term. On January 14, 1886, Myers was succeeded in the office by George M. Govan.

== Later life ==
A few years after leaving office, Myers moved to Memphis, Tennessee, where he entered the banking and insurance businesses. He was stricken with paralysis in December 1916 and died in Memphis on August 19, 1917.

== Personal life ==
Myers married Minnie Walter, the daughter of Colonel H. W. Walter, in 1873. They had one child together, a daughter who married John B. Edgar. Minnie died in 1911.
