= Hannibal C. Carter =

American politician

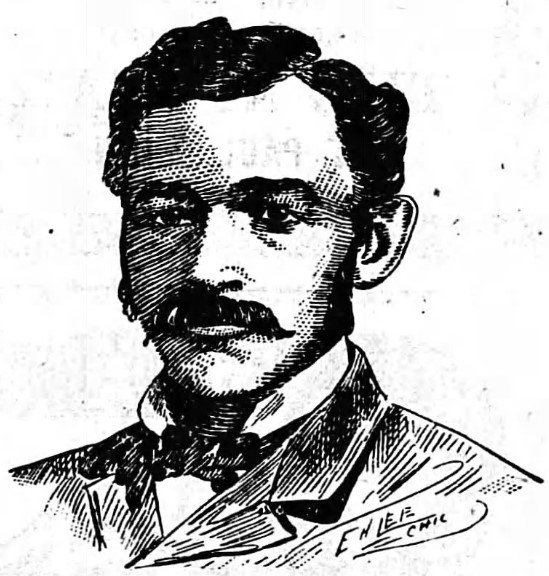

20th and 22nd Secretary of State of Mississippi
- In office September 1, 1873 – October 20, 1873
- Governor: Ridgely C. Powers
- Preceded by: Hiram R. Revels
- Succeeded by: M. M. McLeod
- In office November 13, 1873 – January 4, 1874
- Governor: Ridgely C. Powers
- Preceded by: M. M. McLeod
- Succeeded by: James Hill

Member of the Mississippi House of Representatives from the Warren County district
- In office 1872–1873
- In office 1876–1877

Personal details
- Born: February , 1835 New Albany, Indiana
- Died: June 1, 1904 (aged 69) Chicago, Illinois

Hannibal Caesar Carter (February 1835–June 1, 1904) was the Secretary of State of Mississippi from September 1 to October 20, 1873, and from November 13, 1873, to January 4, 1874, serving the first term after being appointed when Hiram R. Revels resigned. He also served two non-consecutive terms representing Warren County in the Mississippi House of Representatives, the first from 1872 to 1873 the second from 1876 to 1877, both times as a Republican. In later years he changed his affiliation to Democratic. He was one of several African Americans to serve as Mississippi Secretary of State during the Reconstruction era. Carter was born in New Albany, Indiana, in February 1835, to a free Black family, then moving to Toronto, Canada for his early childhood. He and his brother, Edward E. Carter, served in the Native Guards of Louisiana and then both became Captains in the United States Coloured Troops. His father was George Washington Carter, free Black businessman, Freemason, and active member of the Underground Railroad.

He helped establish the Freedmen's Oklahoma Immigration Association in Chicago in 1881.

He spent his later life in Chicago, Illinois, where he then died at home June 1, 1904 at the age of 69.
