= William H. Muse =

12th Secretary of State of Mississippi

12th Secretary of State of Mississippi
- In office January 1854 – January 9, 1855
- Governor: John J. Pettus
- Preceded by: James A. Horne
- Succeeded by: A. B. Dilworth

Personal details
- Born: June 13, 1814 North Carolina, U.S.
- Died: January 9, 1855 (aged 40) Jackson, Mississippi, U.S.
- Party: Democratic Party

William H. Muse (June 13, 1814 - January 9, 1855) was an American politician and lawyer. He was the 12th Secretary of State of Mississippi, serving from January 1854 until his death.

== Biography ==
William H. Muse was born on June 13, 1814, in North Carolina. While young, he moved to Tennessee. Muse attended the University of Nashville, graduating in 1841. He subsequently moved to Huntsville, Alabama. A few years later, he moved to Columbus, Mississippi, and then to Eastport, Mississippi. Muse was a lawyer and a member of the Democratic Party.

Muse was elected to be the Secretary of State of Mississippi in November 1853. His term started in January 1854. Muse died while still in office on January 9, 1855, in Jackson, Mississippi. A. B. Dilworth was appointed to succeed him in the office.
