= Wilson Hemingway =

American politician

8th Secretary of State of Mississippi
- In office January 1843 – January 1847
- Governor: Tilghman Tucker; Albert G. Brown
- Preceded by: L. G. Galloway
- Succeeded by: Samuel Stamps

Personal details
- Born: c. 1805 Horry County, South Carolina
- Died: May 12, 1859 (aged 53–54) Carroll County, Mississippi

Wilson Hemingway (c. 1805 – May 12, 1859) was an American politician. He was the 8th Secretary of State of Mississippi, serving from 1843 to 1847.

== Biography ==
Wilson Hemingway was born circa 1805, in Horry County, South Carolina. He was the son of William Hemingway and Margaret (Wilson) Hemingway. Hemingway was one of the early settlers of Carroll County, Mississippi. Hemingway became the Secretary of State of Mississippi in January 1843.

His tenure in office ended in January 1847, and he was succeeded in office by Samuel Stamps. From 1847 to 1851, Hemingway was the clerk of the Mississippi High Court of Errors and Appeals (now the Supreme Court of Mississippi). After his term ended, Hemingway returned from Jackson to Carroll County. In 1850, Hemingway was one of the incorporators of the Carroll County Manufacturing Company. Hemingway died in his residence in Carroll County on May 12, 1859.
