= Winchester, Mississippi =

Winchester
- Ghost town
- Location within Mississippi
- Coordinates: 31°37′04″N 88°35′26″W
- Country: United States
- State: Mississippi
- County: Wayne
- Elevation: 160 ft (50 m)
- Time zone: UTC-6 (Central (CST))
  - Summer (DST): UTC-5 (CDT)
- GNIS feature ID: 679779

Winchester is a ghost town in Wayne County, Mississippi, United States.

Once a center of political influence and county seat, the former settlement is today covered by forest.

== History ==
Winchester was one of the first significant communities in eastern Mississippi. It was located about 1 mi (1.6 km) east of the Chickasawhay River, and south of "Three-Chopped Way", a pioneer road completed in 1807 connecting Georgia and the Carolinas, via St. Stephens, Alabama, with Natchez in eastern Mississippi.

The town "was situated on a beautiful level site, covered with large oak and other shade trees", and Meadows Mill Creek flowed through Winchester, "a beautiful and never-failing creek of the purest water".

A military post—Patton's Fort—was erected at Winchester in 1813 during the Creek War.

Winchester became "a place of considerable importance in the territorial period and in the days of early statehood", and was Wayne County's first county seat. Incorporated in 1818, Winchester flourished and in 1822 a court house was built "of pine lumber of the best quality". A jail was built in the 1840s, with walls "three feet thick of heavy hewed pine".

Winchester was described as "a center of political influence, second only to Natchez". It had between 20 and 30 businesses, and became a successful commercial center, "having no competing trading points near".

== Decline ==
In the early 1840s, a writer noted that Winchester "is literally tumbling to pieces, and one finds only a skeleton of the flourishing Winchester which existed twenty years ago".

When the Mobile and Ohio Railroad was completed through the town in 1854, the track passed a distance north of the town, and a station was erected there. This necessitated a distinction between "Old Winchester" and the new settlement near the railroad.

In 1867, the county seat moved to Waynesboro.

A writer noted in 1902 that the courthouse in Old Winchester "was still standing a few years ago, 'solitary and alone' and unoccupied. Except that building, not a vestige of the town remains to be seen." Meanwhile, New Winchester had developed, and by 1907 had a population of 300, and contained a school, stores, two churches, a grist mill, two saw mills, a cotton gin and a turpentine distillery.

Some reasons offered for the decline of Old Winchester include "want of hotel accommodations". Another may have been the 1830 Treaty of Dancing Rabbit Creek which forced the removal of the Choctaw people from Mississippi and opened up large areas to the north which drew off the populations of Wayne and Lawrence Counties. Still another reason may have been offered by a writer in 1894 who stated about Winchester:

There was no church in the town until forty years after it was settled. After it lost its trade and importance as a town: after other towns were established in the county: after the railroad came through the county in 1854, then the people paid some attention to the building of a church. It appears that the morals of the people who lived in the town were averse to churches... liquor was sold openly on the Sabbath and [there was] much drunkenness on that day.

Old Winchester today is covered by forest, while New Winchester has some residential homes located along its rural routes. A historic marker is located along U.S. Route 45 at Winchester Cross Road which reads: "About one mile to the West. Site of Patton’s Fort, 1813. Chartered 1818. Near old road from Natchez to Georgia. Became a thriving trade center, serving as county seat until 1867."

== Notable people ==
- Powhatan Ellis, U.S. Senator from Mississippi and U.S. federal judge; moved to Winchester in 1816 to practice law.
- James A. Horne, Secretary of State of Mississippi from 1852 to 1854.
- John J. McRae, member of Mississippi House of Representatives, U.S. Senator from Mississippi, and 21st Governor of Mississippi. Located to Winchester as an infant.
- James O'Gwynn, country music singer.
- James Patton, Lieutenant-Governor of Mississippi from 1820 to 1822.
