= M. M. McLeod =

American politician

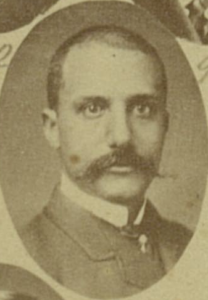

21st Secretary of State of Mississippi
- In office October 20, 1873 – November 13, 1873
- Governor: Ridgley C. Powers
- Preceded by: H. C. Carter
- Succeeded by: H. C. Carter

Member of the Mississippi House of Representatives from the Hinds County district
- In office January 1884 – January 1886

Personal details
- Born: c. 1847 Ohio
- Died: December 1895 (aged 47–48) Aberdeen, Mississippi
- Party: Republican

Murdock M. McLeod (c. 1847 – December 1895) was a lawyer who served as a city clerk and state legislator in Mississippi. A Republican, he served as the 21st Secretary of State of Mississippi from October to November 1873. He is listed as one of several "Negro" Mississippi Secretary of State officeholders who served during the Reconstruction era.

== Biography ==
Murdock M. McLeod was born circa 1847 in Ohio. He served as the city clerk of Jackson, Mississippi. On October 20, 1873, McLeod was appointed Secretary of State of Mississippi by Mississippi governor Ridgley C. Powers. McLeod served until he resigned on November 13, 1873. From 1884 to 1886, he represented Hinds County in the Mississippi House of Representatives. McLeod died in December 1895 in Aberdeen, Mississippi.
