= Thomas B. Woodward =

American politician and jurist

6th Secretary of State of Mississippi
- In office July 1839 – November 1841
- Preceded by: Barry W. Benson
- Succeeded by: L. G. Galloway

Member of the Mississippi House of Representatives from the Yazoo County district
- In office 1838

Personal details
- Born: South Carolina, U. S.
- Died: November 29, 1871 Hopkins County, Texas, U. S.
- Party: Democratic

Thomas B. Woodward (died November 29, 1871) was an American politician and jurist. He was the 6th Secretary of State of Mississippi, serving from 1839 to 1841.

== Biography ==
Woodward was born in South Carolina, but later moved to Yazoo County, Mississippi. He became a member of the Democratic Party. He represented Yazoo County in the Mississippi House of Representatives in 1838. He was appointed to the office of Secretary of State of Mississippi in 1839, replacing Barry W. Benson, who had died in office. Woodward's term ended in November 1841. Woodward was succeeded in office by L. G. Galloway. Woodward later moved to Sulphur Springs, Texas. He died near there, in Hopkins County, Texas, on November 29, 1871.
