= William E. Brougher =

United States Army general (1889–1965)

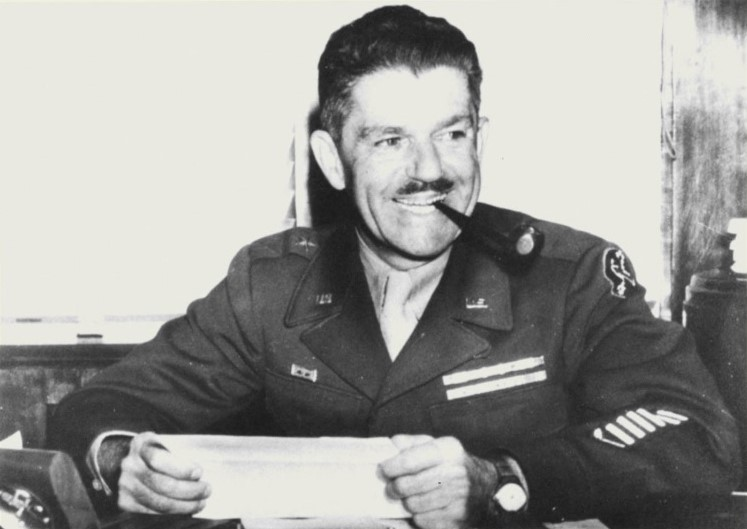
- Born: February 17, 1889; Jackson, Mississippi, U.S.
- Died: March 5, 1965 (aged 76); Chattahoochee County, Georgia, U.S.
- Military career
- Allegiance: United States of America
- Branch: United States Army
- Service years: 1911–1949
- Rank: Brigadier General
- Commands: Fort Gordon; Fort McClellan; 11th Division (Philippines); 57th Infantry Regiment
- Conflicts: World War I; Meuse-Argonne offensive; World War II; Battle of Bataan (POW)
- Awards: Army Distinguished Service Medal

William Edward Brougher (February 17, 1889 – March 5, 1965) was a brigadier general in the United States Army.

== Early life and education ==
Brougher was born in Jackson, Mississippi, to Charles Brougher and Jessie Manship. His paternal grandfather was Charles Albert Brougher, who was the Secretary of State of Mississippi in the 1860s. His maternal grandfather was Jackson, Mississippi mayor Charles Henry Manship. In 1910, Brougher received a BS degree from Mississippi Agricultural and Mechanical College, where he was a classmate of Luther R. Stevens. In 1911, he entered the U.S. Army. Brougher accepted a commission as a second lieutenant of infantry in January 1912. He later graduated from the Command and General Staff School in 1923, the Army Industrial College in 1933 and the Army War College in 1938.

== World War I ==
During World War I, Brougher held the rank of major and served in the 174th Infantry Brigade and the 79th Infantry Division.

== World War II ==
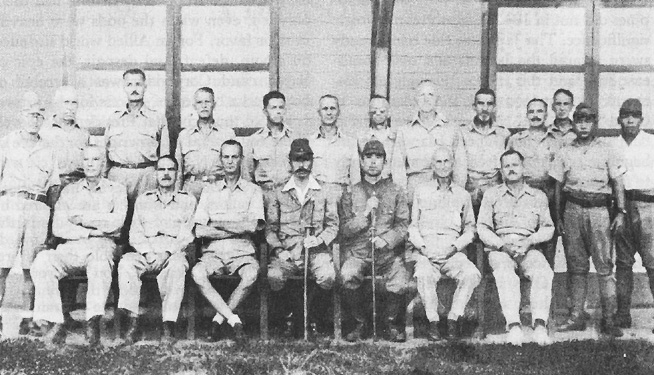
American generals in Japanese captivity, July 1942; Brougher is the fifth from the left, standing

In October 1939, Brougher, then a lieutenant colonel, was assigned to the 57th Infantry Regiment in the Philippines. He was promoted to colonel in November, 1940. In September 1941, he was put in command of the 11th Division of the Philippine Army and temporarily promoted to brigadier general. The 11th Division fought the invading Japanese forces from December 1941 until the surrender of US forces in April 1942. Brougher was a prisoner of war until August 1945.

== Later life ==
After returning to the United States, Brougher served as the commander of Fort McClellan in Alabama until 1947. He then became the commander of Fort Gordon in Georgia. Brougher retired from active duty as a colonel on February 28, 1949, and was advanced to brigadier general on the retired list the following day.

After his retirement, Brougher and his wife Frances lived in Atlanta, Georgia. He wrote about his experiences, including the Bataan Death March in his war memoirs, South to Bataan, North to Mukden. Brougher died in the Martin Army Hospital at Fort Benning. He was buried at Marietta National Cemetery.

== See also ==
- 11th Division (Philippines)
