= Barry W. Benson =

Mississippi Secretary of State (1835–1839)

4th Secretary of State of Mississippi
- In office January 1835 – June 11, 1839
- Governor: Hiram Runnels; John A. Quitman; Charles Lynch; Alexander G. McNutt
- Preceded by: D. C. Dickson
- Succeeded by: David Dickson; Thomas B. Woodward

Personal details
- Born: 1811 or 1812 Mississippi
- Died: June 11, 1839 (aged 27) Columbus, Mississippi
- Party: Democrat

Barry W. Benson (1811/1812 – June 11, 1839) was the Mississippi Secretary of State from 1835 to 1839. He was a Democrat.

== Biography ==
Barry W. Benson was born in Mississippi. His father was a Mississippi pioneer. Barry W. Benson was elected to the office of the Secretary of State of Mississippi in January 1835. He was re-elected to the office in 1837. At the time of his death, he was the incumbent office holder as well as the Democratic candidate for re-election.

== Death ==
Benson died of pulmonary tuberculosis at the age of 27 on June 11, 1839, at the home of his father-in-law in Columbus, Mississippi, and was survived by his mother and his widow. He had recently gone to Cuba to try to improve his lung condition. In early July 1839, Thomas B. Woodward of Yazoo County was appointed by Governor Alexander McNutt to fill in the vacancy caused by Benson's death.

== Personal life ==
Benson married the eldest daughter of Major Richard Barry. She remarried after Benson's death.
