= James A. Horne =

American politician

11th Secretary of State of Mississippi
- In office January 1852 – January 1854
- Governor: Henry S. Foote
- Preceded by: Joseph Bell
- Succeeded by: William H. Muse

Personal details
- Born: 1818 or 1819
- Political party: Whig (1860)

James A. Horne was an American politician.

Horne was born in 1818 or 1819. In 1851, while living in Marion, Mississippi, Horne ran for the office of Secretary of State of Mississippi on the "Union Ticket" alongside Henry S. Foote. He served as Secretary of State of Mississippi from 1852 to 1854. He later moved to the town of Winchester, Mississippi, where he was a banker by profession. As a Whig, he participated in the Mississippi Constitutional Convention of 1865.
