= Heber Austin Ladner =

American politician

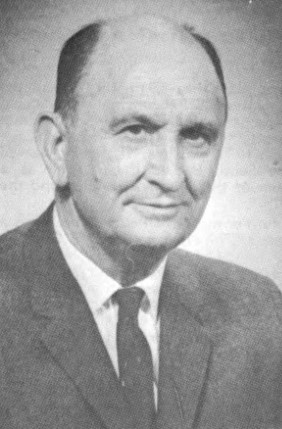
- circa 1972

31st Secretary of State of Mississippi
- In office 1948–1980
- Governor: Fielding L. Wright; Hugh L. White; James P. Coleman; Ross Barnett; Paul B. Johnson Jr. John Bell Williams; William Waller; Cliff Finch
- Preceded by: Walker Wood
- Succeeded by: Ed Pittman

Member of the Mississippi House of Representatives from the Pearl River County district
- In office January 1936 – January 1940

Personal details
- Born: October 4, 1902 Lumberton, Mississippi
- Died: June 14, 1989 (aged 86) Jackson, Mississippi
- Party: Democrat

Heber Austin Ladner (October 4, 1902 – June 14, 1989) was the Secretary of State of Mississippi from 1948 to 1980. He was a Democrat.

== Early life and education ==
Heber Austin Ladner was born on October 4, 1902, in Lumberton, Mississippi. His parents were Webster L. Ladner and Valena Beall Ladner. He graduated from Millsaps College with a BS degree in 1929.

== Career ==
Ladner started his political career as a member of the Mississippi House of Representatives in 1936. In the House, he represented Pearl River County from 1936 to 1940. From 1940 to 1942, he was the Secretary of the Mississippi Budget Commission. He was the Clerk of the Mississippi House of Representatives from 1942 to 1948.

In 1948, Ladner became the Secretary of State of Mississippi. In 1968, he administrated the oath to the first black state legislator elected in 74 years. However, he was a defendant in suits brought by black people for school desegregation and proportional representation in county election boards. He chaired the Mississippi Bicentennial Celebration Commission. He left office in January 1980, holding the record for longest-serving Secretary of State of Mississippi. Declining to seek an additional term, he reasoned, "I would be in office in my 80s. I have not had really any rest for several decades. I think I've earned some."

Ladner died of heart disease on June 14, 1989, at the Mississippi Baptist Medical Center in Jackson, Mississippi.

== Honors ==
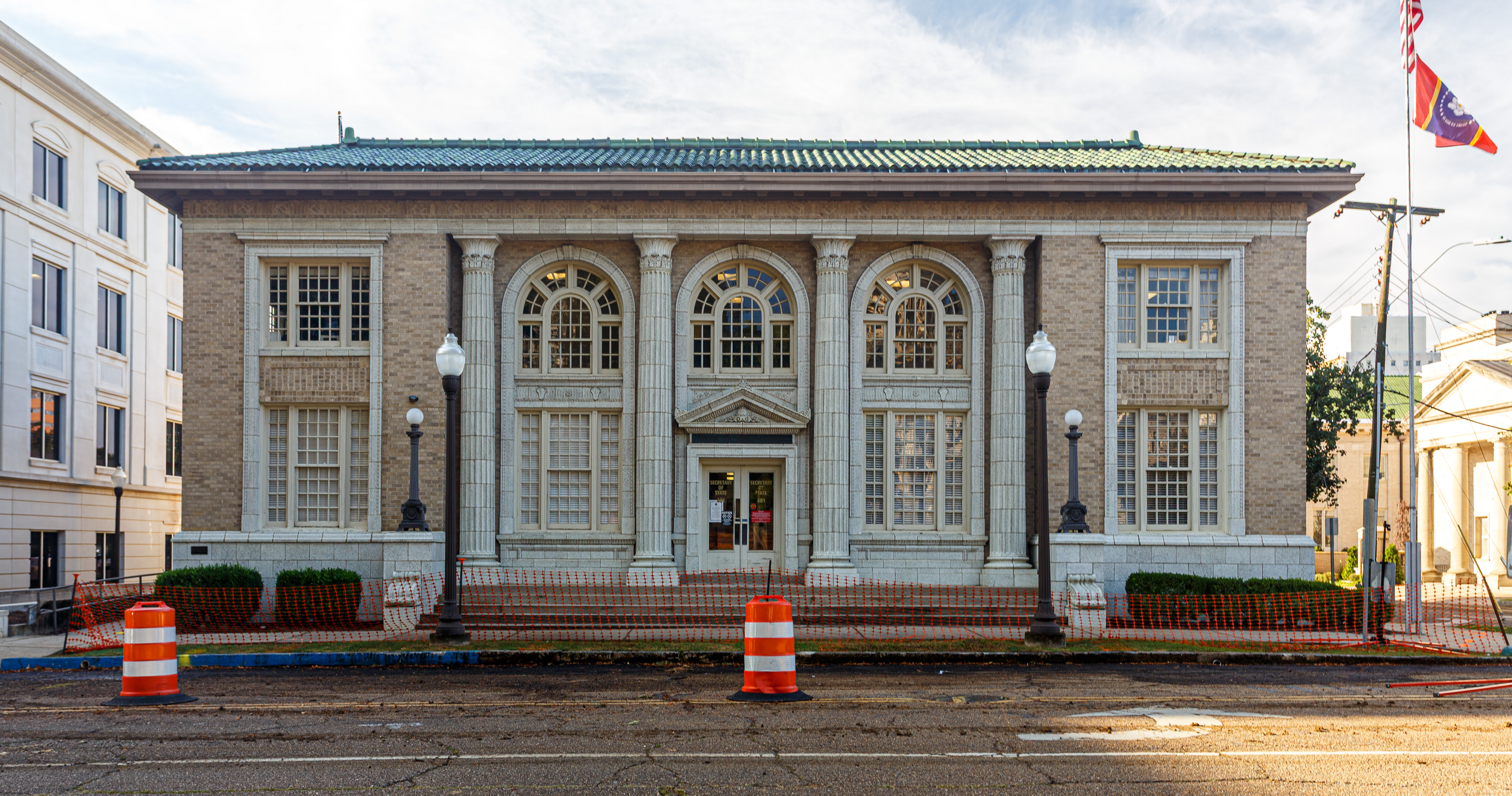
Heber Ladner Building

The Mississippi State Executive Building, located at 401 North Congress Street in Jackson, Mississippi, was renamed for Ladner in 1999. The building holds the offices of the Mississippi Secretary of State.

== Works cited ==
- National Association of Secretaries of State Handbook. National Association of Secretaries of State. 1979.

Party political offices
Preceded by Walker Wood	Democratic nominee for Secretary of State of Mississippi; 1947, 1951, 1955, 1959, 1963, 1967, 1971, 1975	Succeeded by Edwin L. Pittman
