= Joseph Bell (Mississippi politician) =

American politician

10th Secretary of State of Mississippi
- In office December 1850 – January 1852
- Preceded by: Samuel Stamps
- Succeeded by: James A. Horne

Member of the Mississippi State Senate from the unknown district
- In office 1842–1844

Member of the Mississippi House of Representatives from the Winston County district
- In office 1839–1841

Personal details
- Born: 1810 or 1811 Tennessee, U.S.
- Died: March 17, 1885 (aged 74) Jackson, Mississippi, U.S.
- Party: Democratic

Joseph Bell (c. 1811 - March 17, 1885) was an American Democratic politician. He was the 10th Secretary of State of Mississippi, serving from December 1850 to January 1852. He also represented Winston County in both houses of the Mississippi Legislature.

== Biography ==
Bell was born circa 1811 in Tennessee. Bell became one of the first people to settle Winston County, Mississippi, after it was organized in December 1833. He also was a surveyor of the county. A Democrat, Bell represented Winston County in the Mississippi House of Representatives from 1839 to 1841. He then represented Winston and Noxubee Counties in the Mississippi State Senate from 1842 to 1844. Bell was appointed to the office of Secretary of State of Mississippi in December 1850, after the death of Secretary of State of Mississippi Samuel Stamps. For 20 days in November 1851, Bell acted as acting governor, due to the terms of all of the other executive officers in Mississippi expiring. His term ended in January 1852, when he was succeeded by James A. Horne. Bell was an alderman of Jackson, Mississippi, in 1858, 1860, and 1862. Bell died on March 17, 1885, at his home near Jackson, Mississippi. He was 74 years old.
