= James Hill (Mississippi politician) =

American politician (c.1838–1903)

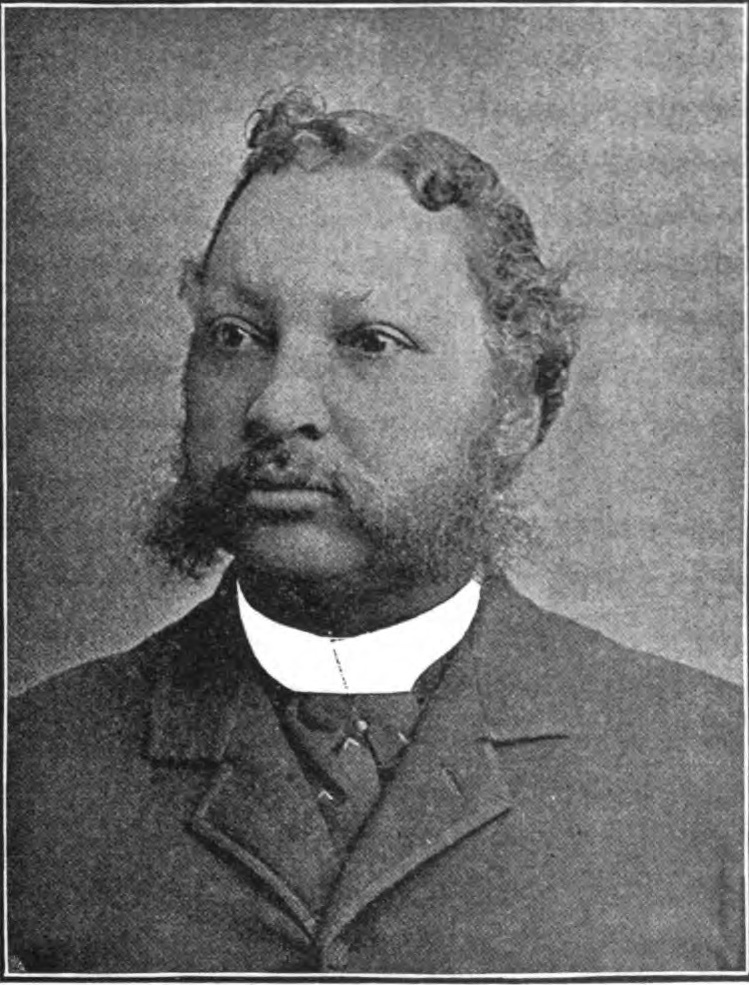

23rd Secretary of State of Mississippi
- In office January 4, 1874 – January 1878
- Governor: Adelbert Ames; John M. Stone
- Preceded by: Hannibal C. Carter
- Succeeded by: Kinloch Falconer

Personal details
- Born: 1837 or 1838 Marshall County, Mississippi
- Died: June 12, 1903 (aged 65)
- Party: Republican
- Occupation: Politician, postmaster, businessman

James Hill (c. 1838 – June 12, 1903) was a Republican politician and government official in the U.S. state of Mississippi. He served in the Mississippi House of Representatives, including as Sergeant at Arms and as Speaker, and was Secretary of State of Mississippi during the Reconstruction era.

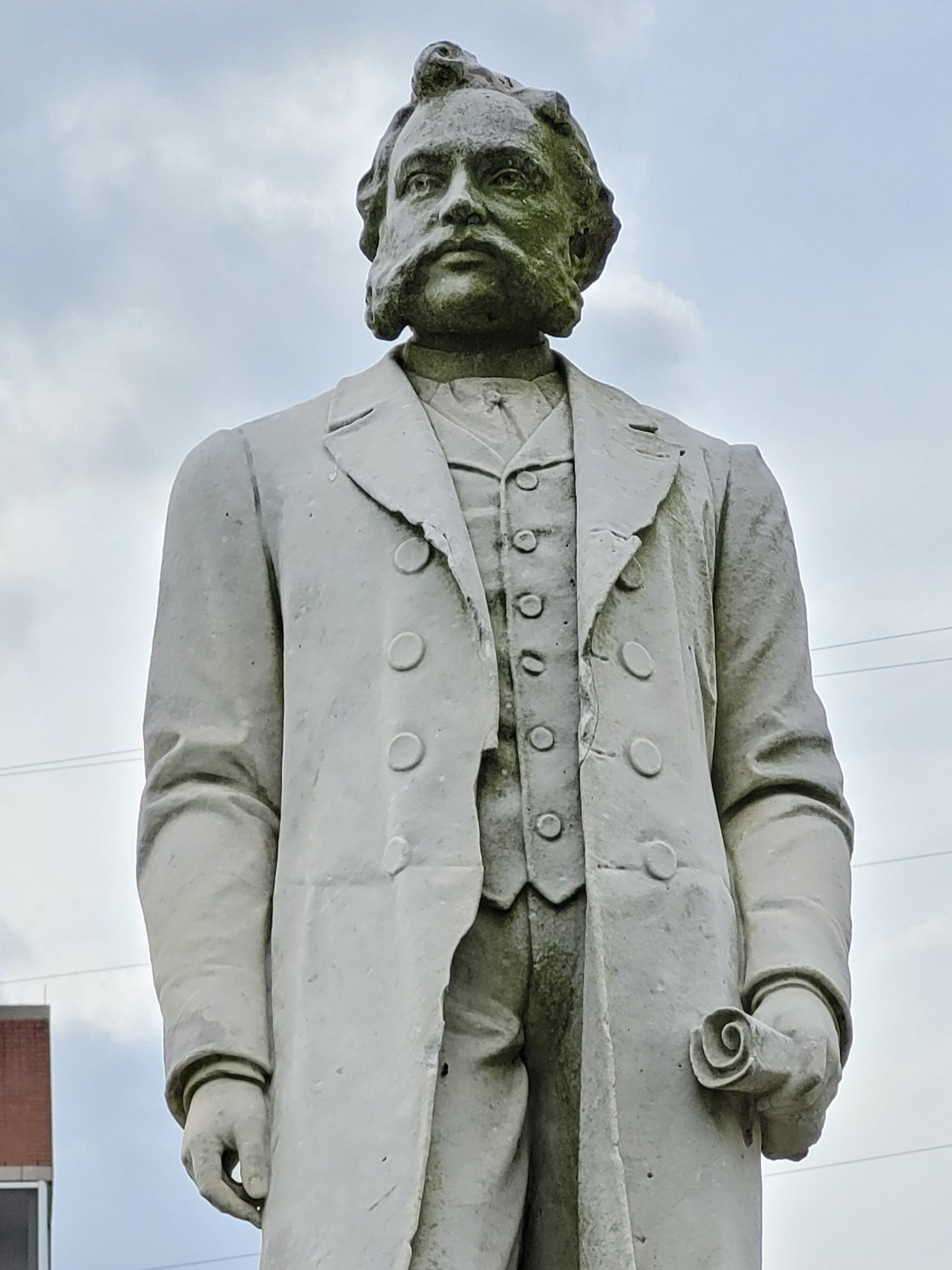
Statue of James Hill in Mount Olive Cemetery, Jackson, Mississippi

== Biography ==
Hill was born in Marshall County, Mississippi, in the late 1830s. Hill was enslaved by James Hill and was described as being a light mulatto. He apprenticed as a machinist and became a "first-class mechanic".

During the Reconstruction era, Hill served as Secretary of State of Mississippi from January 4, 1874, until January 1878. He was the last African American to hold statewide office in Mississippi. He was one of several African Americans who served as Mississippi Secretary of State during the Reconstruction era.

After his service as Secretary of State, Hill served as postmaster and collector of internal revenues for the city of Vicksburg; he also campaigned for a congressional seat.

Later in life, he worked as president of the Mississippi Cotton Manufacturing Company based in Jackson, and as of 1900, he was serving in the United States General Land Office in Jackson, having been appointed to the office by President William McKinley.

Around February 1903 he started a weekly paper called the Mississippi State Register aimed at both Black and white readers and intended to serve as an "olive branch of peace" amid racial conflict.

Hill died suddenly June 12, 1903 from heart disease aged 65. He never married.

== Legacy ==
A statue of Hill is located at Mount Olive Cemetery in Jackson, Mississippi. An elementary school was named for him and later became Jim Hill High School.
