= C. A. Brougher =

American politician (1824–1891)

14th and 16th Secretary of State of Mississippi
- In office August 1865 – September 10, 1869
- Preceded by: Alexander Warner
- Succeeded by: Henry Musgrove
- In office January or April 16, 1860 – June 1865
- Governor: John J. Pettus; Charles Clark
- Preceded by: B. R. Webb
- Succeeded by: Alexander Warner

Personal details
- Born: Charles Albert Brougher; June 19, 1824 Morgan County, Alabamam US
- Died: November 25, 1891 (aged 67) Jackson, Mississippi, US
- Relations: Frederick Brougher (father); William E. Brougher (grandson)

Charles Albert Brougher (June 19, 1824 – November 25, 1891) was an American politician. He was the 14th and 16th Secretary of State of Mississippi, serving from 1860 to 1865 and 1865 to 1869.

== Biography ==
Brougher was born on June 19, 1824, in Morgan County, Alabama. He was the son of politician Frederick Brougher and Mary Ann Brougher. He graduated from Gettysburg College (then Pennsylvania College) in 1846, then worked as an educator from 1846 to 1849. He read law in Ripley, Mississippi and was admitted to the bar in 1852.

Brougher was appointed to the office of Secretary of State of Mississippi on January or April 16, 1860, to fill in the vacancy left by the death of B. R. Webb, who died on January 16, six days after he was appointed. Brougher was re-elected in October 1863. His tenure in office ended when Union Army colonel Alexander Warner was appointed Secretary of State by the military, in June 1865. After Warner's removal from the office in August 1865, Brougher was re-elected to the office in October of the same year. He served until September 1869 and was succeeded by Henry Musgrove.

Brougher married Marie Louisa Earle on May 23, 1857. He died of an unknown disease on November 25, 1891, aged 67, at his home in Jackson, Mississippi. He was the paternal grandfather of military officer William E. Brougher.
