= B. R. Webb =

American politician

14th Secretary of State of Mississippi
- In office January 10, 1860 – January 16, 1860
- Governor: John J. Pettus
- Preceded by: A. B. Dilworth
- Succeeded by: C. A. Brougher

Member of the Mississippi State Senate from the Pontotoc County district
- In office 1854–1857
- Preceded by: John Bell
- Succeeded by: Jefferson Wilson

Member of the Mississippi House of Representatives from the Pontotoc County district
- In office 1850 Serving with J. Barden, W. H. Baker
- Preceded by: J. Barden, William Melton, Henry Duke
- Succeeded by: J. C. Jones, J. Barden, Jefferson Wilson

Personal details
- Born: c.1811 or 1812
- Died: January 16, 1860 Jackson, Mississippi

Britton R. Webb (died January 16, 1860) was an American politician. He was the 14th Secretary of State of Mississippi, serving from January 10, 1860, to his death six days later.

== Biography ==
Webb represented Pontotoc County in the Mississippi House of Representatives in 1850. He then represented the same county in the Mississippi State Senate from 1854 to 1857 (inclusive). Webb was appointed as the Secretary of State of Mississippi on January 10, 1860, succeeding A. B. Dilworth. However, Webb died in office, in Jackson, Mississippi, on January 16, 1860, six days after being appointment. He was about 48 years old. Charles Albert Brougher was appointed to replace him as Secretary.
