= Alexander Warner =

American politician (1827–1914)

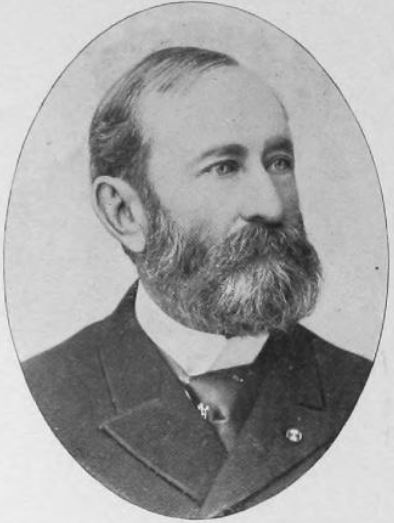

15th Secretary of State of Mississippi
- In office June 1865 – August 12, 1865
- Governor: William L. Sharkey
- Preceded by: C. A. Brougher
- Succeeded by: C. A. Brougher

44th State Treasurer of Connecticut
- In office 1887–1889
- Preceded by: V. B. Chamberlain
- Succeeded by: E. Stevens Henry

Member of the Mississippi Senate from the 12th district
- In office January 1870 – January 1876

Member of the Kansas House of Representatives from the 25th district
- In office January 20, 1893 – January 1897

Personal details
- Born: January 10, 1827 Smithfield, Rhode Island, U.S.
- Died: September 6, 1914 (aged 87) Point Pleasant, New Jersey, U.S.
- Party: Republican
- Children: 2

Military service
- Allegiance: United States
- Branch/service: Army
- Years of service: 1861–1863
- Rank: Colonel
- Commands: 3rd Connecut Volunteer Infantry Regiment; 13th Connecticut Infantry Regiment; 5th Louisiana Infantry Regiment
- Battles/wars: Civil War: First Battle of Bull Run; Battle of Georgia Landing; Battle of Irish Bend; Siege of Port Hudson

Alexander Warner (January 10, 1827 – September 6, 1914) was an American Union Army officer, banker, planter, and Republican politician. He was the 15th Secretary of State of Mississippi, the 44th State Treasurer of Connecticut, and a member of the Kansas House of Representatives.

== Biography ==
Alexander Warner was born on January 10, 1827, in Smithfield, Rhode Island. He was the son of Thomas Warner and Amy (Collins) Warner. His family moved to Woodstock, Connecticut, in 1834. He attended Woodstock Academy in Woodstock and Wesleyan Academy in Wilbraham, Massachusetts. He then worked as a cotton twine manufacturer, owning and managing a cotton twine manufacturing factory.

== Military career ==
Warner was one of the first people to enlist in the American Civil War. He was appointed major of the 3rd Infantry of Connecticut Volunteers on May 14, 1861. On July 21 of that year, he and his unit fought in the 1st Battle of Bull Run. The 3rd Infantry was mustered out on August 12, 1861. On January 15, 1862, Warner was appointed lieutenant colonel of the 13th Connecticut Infantry Regiment and sent to Louisiana. After the Union capture of New Orleans, the unit's colonel, Henry Birge, was made a brigadier general and Warner was promoted to colonel of the unit. He then fought in the Battle of Georgia Landing, the Battle of Irish Bend, and the Siege of Port Hudson. He then temporarily resigned due to ill health. After returning to service, he raised the 5th Louisiana Infantry Regiment for defending the Union-controlled New Orleans. He did this until resigning due to ill health on August 12, 1863. After the war, he bought a large plantation in Madison County, Mississippi, where he employed freedmen and gave them monetary wages.

== Political career ==
=== Mississippi ===
In June 1865, he was appointed Secretary of State of Mississippi by the military. He served in this position until his removal on August 12, 1865. From 1870 to 1876, he represented the state's 12th district (Madison County) in the Mississippi Senate. For part of that time, he was also its President Pro Tempore. In 1876, he was a commissioner from Mississippi to the Centennial Exposition.

=== Connecticut ===
Warner moved to Pomfret, Connecticut, in 1877, buying a farm there called "Woodlawn". He was elected to be the 44th State Treasurer of Connecticut, serving from 1887 to 1889. In Connecticut, he was also a member of its State Board of Agriculture. During this time, he was a commissioner from Connecticut to the Centennial celebration in Philadelphia (1887), Ohio Centennial (1888), and the New York Centennial (1889).

=== Kansas ===
In 1890, Warner moved to Baxter Springs, Kansas. While there, he was the president of the Baxter Bank. In 1892, he was elected to the Kansas House of Representatives, representing the state's 25th district. He assumed the position on January 20, 1893. He was re-elected and also served from 1895 to 1897. In 1896, he ran as a Republican for the position of Lieutenant Governor of Kansas.

== Later life ==
After his wife died in 1902, Warner moved to his son's house in Point Pleasant, New Jersey, where he spent the rest of his life. Warner died after a two-week illness in Point Pleasant, New Jersey, on September 6, 1914. He was buried at Woodstock Hill Cemetery in Woodstock, Connecticut.

== Personal life ==
Warner married Mary Trumbull Mathewson (1834–1902) on September 27, 1855. Mathewson was the great-granddaughter of Declaration of Independence signer William Williams. Together, they had two children: Benjamin Silliman Warner, born September 24, 1856, and Arthur McClellan Warner, who was born on April 13, 1860, and died in his childhood.
