= James O'Gwynn =

American country singer-songwriter (1928–2011)

- Born: James Leroy O'Gwynn; January 26, 1928; Winchester, Mississippi
- Origin: Winchester, Mississippi, U.S.
- Died: January 19, 2011 (aged 82) Hattiesburg, Mississippi, U.S.
- Genres: Country
- Occupation: Singer
- Instrument: Vocals
- Years active: 1958–1962
- Labels: D, Mercury, United Artists, Plantation

James Leroy O'Gwynn (January 26, 1928 – January 19, 2011) was an American country music singer. Between 1958 and 1962, he recorded for the D Records and Mercury labels, charting six times on the Hot Country Songs charts. His work on the D Records label was produced by Pappy Daily, best known for producing George Jones.

O'Gwynn's highest-peaking single came during his Mercury career, when he reached No. 7 with "My Name Is Mud." None of his other singles afterward made the charts, and he moved among several labels, including United Artists Records and Plantation Records.

== Singles ==
Year	Single	Chart Positions
Year	Single	US Country
1956	"Losing Game"	—
1958	"Talk to Me Lonesome Heart"	16
1958	"Blue Memories"	28
1959	"How Can I Think of Tomorrow"	13
1959	"Easy Money"	26
1961	"House of Blue Lovers"	21
1962	"My Name Is Mud"	7
