= Holly Springs Township, Wake County, North Carolina =

Township in Wake County, North Carolina, U.S.

Coordinates: 35.6369883°N 78.8609122°W

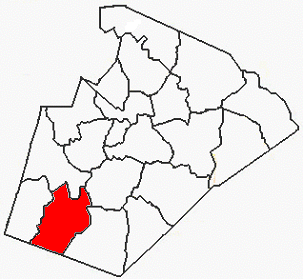

Holly Springs Township (also designated Township 6) is one of twenty townships within Wake County, North Carolina, United States. As of the 2010 United States census, Holly Springs Township had a population of 33,071, a 102.8% increase over 2000.

Holly Springs Township, occupying 48.0 square miles (124.2 km^{2}) in southwestern Wake County, includes most of the town of Holly Springs and portions of the towns of Apex and Fuquay-Varina.
