= 18th Mississippi Infantry Regiment =

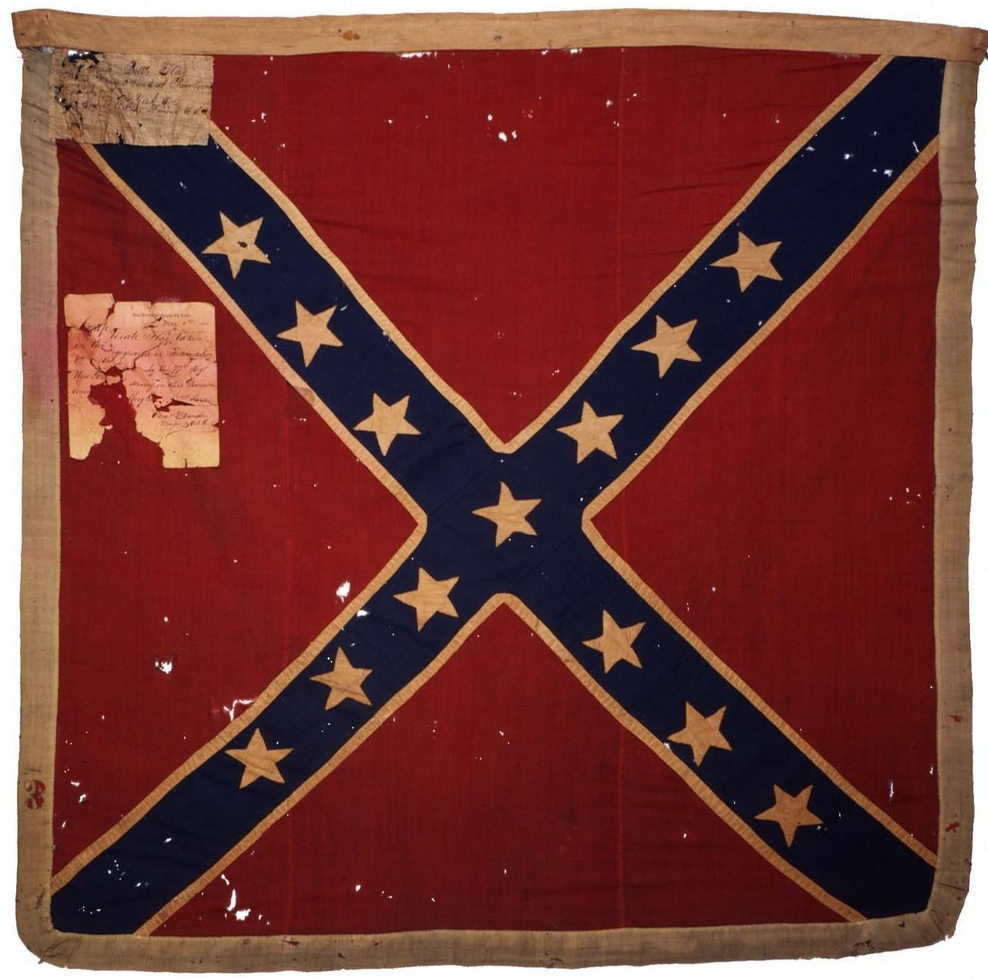
- Battle flag of the 18th Mississippi Infantry
- Active: 1861–1865
- Disbanded: April 9, 1865
- Country: Confederate States
- Allegiance: Mississippi
- Branch: Confederate States Army
- Type: Infantry
- Size: Regiment
- Battles: American Civil War: First Battle of Bull Run; Battle of Ball's Bluff; Seven Days Battles; Battle of Harper's Ferry; Battle of Antietam; Battle of Fredericksburg; Second Battle of Fredericksburg; Battle of Gettysburg; Battle of Chickamauga; Battle of the Wilderness; Overland Campaign; Valley Campaigns of 1864

Commanders
- Notable commanders: Erasmus Burt

The 18th Mississippi Infantry Regiment was a unit of the Confederate States Army that took part in many battles of the Eastern Theater of the American Civil War.

== History ==
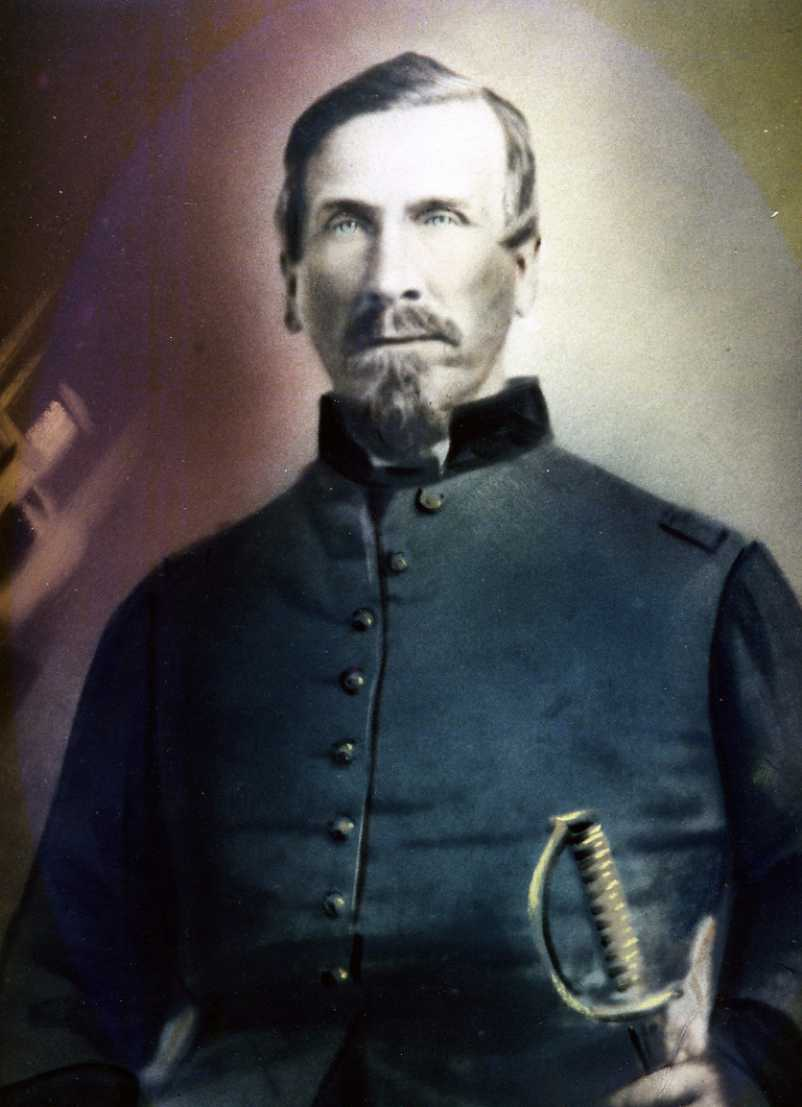
Erasmus Burt, first colonel of the regiment, died of wounds received at Ball's Bluff, 1861.

The companies of the 18th Mississippi were organized in June 1861 with an initial strength of 1,100 men under the command of Mississippi general James L. Alcorn. Company E of the regiment was formed of teenage volunteers, mainly students at Mississippi College at Clinton. Erasmus Burt, formerly the state auditor, was made colonel of the regiment. The troops immediately proceeded via rail to Virginia, where the 18th took part in the First Battle of Bull Run in July. At the Battle of Ball's Bluff in October, the regiment took heavy casualties. Col. Burt was mortally wounded and command passed to Thomas M. Griffin. One of the soldiers of the 18th killed at Ball's Bluff was John Pettus, the son of Mississippi governor John J. Pettus. In his after-action report of the battle, Col. Featherston of the 17th Mississippi reported: "I cannot refrain from expressing my admiration for the gallantry displayed by the officers and men of the Eighteenth Regiment while under my observation."

In late 1861 the regiment was attached to the brigade of Mississippi general Richard Griffith. The following summer, the 18th took part in the Seven Days Battles, fighting at Malvern Hill and once again taking heavy casualties. Col. Thomas Griffin was wounded at Malvern Hill, and General Griffith was killed during the Seven Days battles. The 18th fought at the Battle of Harpers Ferry, the Battle of Antietam, and the Battle of Fredericksburg where the regiment led by Lt. Col. William H. Luse opposed federal attempts to build a pontoon bridge across the Rappahannock.

In 1863, the regiment fought at the Second Battle of Fredericksburg during the Chancellorsville Campaign, with the 18th posted at the stone wall on Marye's Height where Confederate defenders took major casualties. Most of the regiment, including commanding officer William H. Luse, was captured following Union assaults on their position. After being exchanged, the 18th took part in the Battle of Gettysburg as part of General Barksdale's brigade. During Barksdale's charge against The Peach Orchard, his brigade took heavy casualties and Barksdale himself was mortally wounded.

Following the retreat from Pennsylvania, the 18th was sent south to assist Confederate forces in Georgia. The regiment fought at the Battle of Chickamauga and the subsequent Knoxville campaign. The 18th then returned to Virginia and fought at the Battle of the Wilderness and other battles in Grant's Overland Campaign. By January 1864 the 18th Mississippi had been reduced to a strength of 220 men, and by the summer the regiment had been so decimated by losses that it had no serving field officers, as noted in a letter from Confederate President Jefferson Davis to General Robert E. Lee. The regiment assisted the forces of General Jubal A. Early in the Valley campaigns of 1864. Following Early's defeat, the 18th was moved to defend Richmond, and the remnants of the regiment surrendered at Appomattox Court House on April 9, 1865.

== Commanders ==
Commanders of the 18th Mississippi Infantry:

- Col. Erasmus Burt, died of wounds after Battle of Ball's Bluff, 1861.
- Col. Thomas M. Griffin, retired 1864.
- Lt. Col. Walter G. Kearny, resigned 1862.
- Lt. Col. William H. Luse

== Organization ==
Companies of the 18th Mississippi Infantry:

- Company A, "Confederate Rifles"
- Company B, "Benton Rifles" of Yazoo County.
- Company C, "Confederates"
- Company D, "Hamer Rifles", of Yazoo City.
- Company E, "Mississippi College Rifles"
- Company F, "McClung Rifles", of Yazoo County.
- Company G, "Camden Rifles", of Madison County.
- Company H, "Brown Rebels" of Hinds County.
- Company I, "Beauregard Rifles of Madison County.
- Company K, "Burt Rifles"

== See also ==
- List of Mississippi Civil War Confederate units
