= Erasmus Burt =

American politician

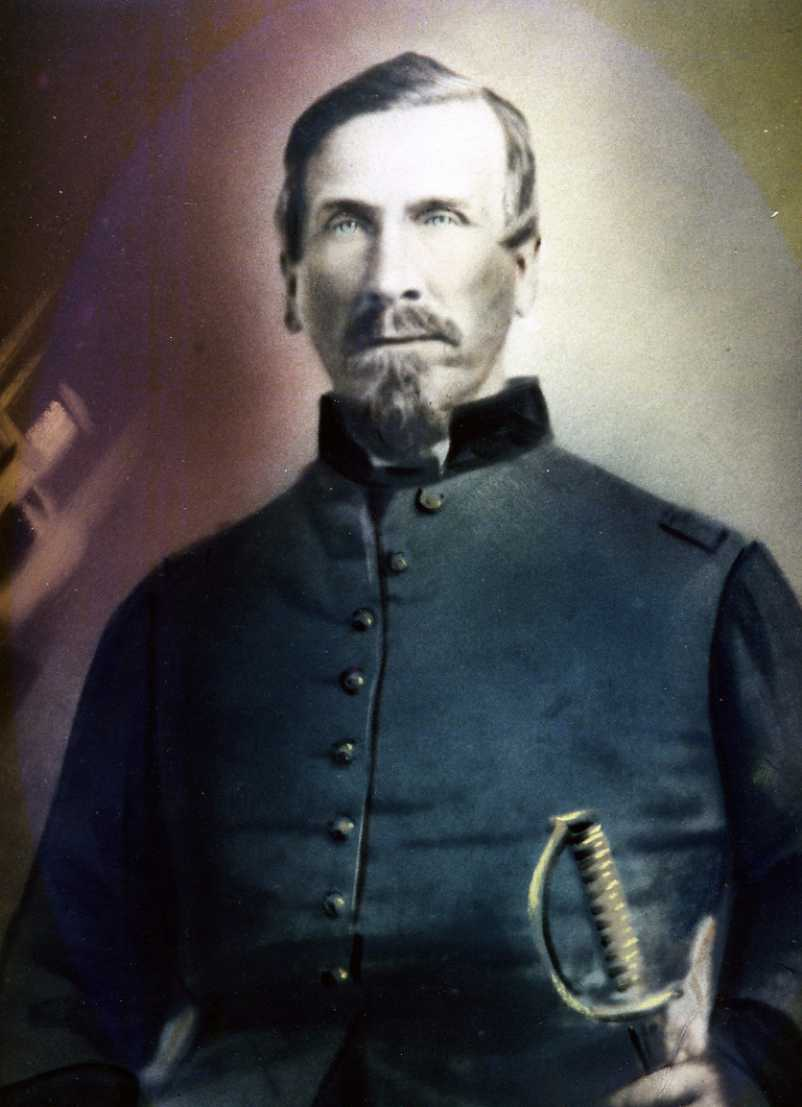
- Erasmus R. Burt
- Born: 1820; Edgefield County, South Carolina, US
- Died: October 26, 1861 (aged 40–41); Leesburg, Virginia
- Burial place: Jackson, Mississippi
- Spouse: Lucy Ann Morgan
- Relatives: Eight children
- Military career
- Allegiance: Confederate States of America
- Branch: Confederate States Army
- Service years: 1861
- Rank: Colonel
- Commands: 18th Mississippi Infantry Regiment
- Conflicts: American Civil War: First Battle of Manassas; Battle of Ball's Bluff †
Erasmus Burt
11th State Auditor of Mississippi
- In office 1859–1861
- Preceded by: Madison McAfee
- Succeeded by: A. B. Dilworth

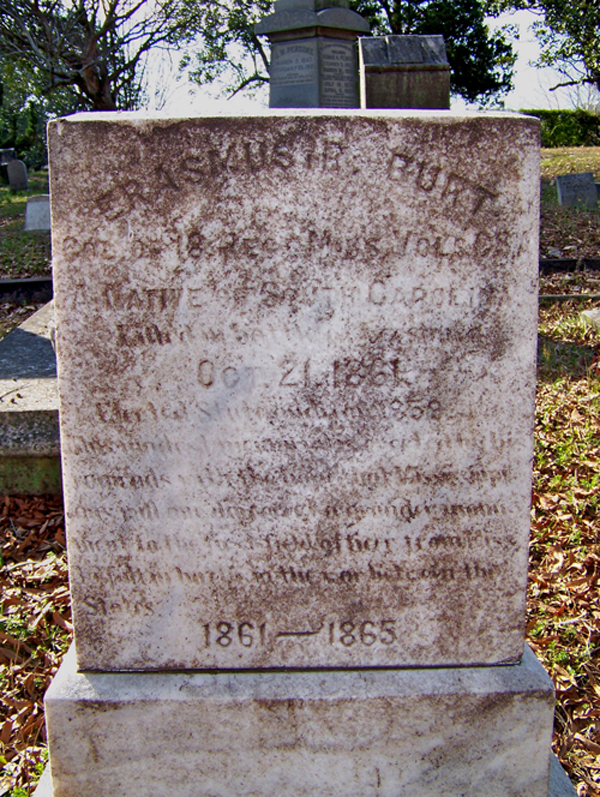
The grave of Erasmus Burt

Erasmus R. Burt (c. 1820 – October 26, 1861) was an American medical doctor, politician, and soldier. He served as the State Auditor of Mississippi, and was then a member of the Mississippi House of Representatives. During the American Civil War, he was a colonel in the Confederate States Army and was killed in action at the Battle of Ball's Bluff in Northern Virginia. He was known as “the Father of the Deaf and Dumb Institute of Mississippi”.

Burt owned four slaves.

== Early life and career ==
Erasmus Burt was born around 1820 in Edgefield County, South Carolina. He was one of ten children of Francis Burt, a member of South Carolina House of Representatives from 1798 to 1800, and Catherine Miles. His brothers included Armistead Burt, who was elected to Congress in 1843 for South Carolina and served until 1853 and who was married to the niece of John C. Calhoun, and Francis Burt, who served in Washington, D.C. as the Third Auditor of the Treasury, and in 1854 was appointed the first Territorial Governor of Nebraska.

Erasmus and two other brothers, Matthew and Oswell, studied medicine in Alabama. Dr. Matthew Burt practiced medicine in Jacksonville, Alabama, where he died in 1839. Oswell E. Burt moved to Alabama where he founded the town of Alexandria, and then moved to Texas. Erasmus Burt first practiced medicine in Calhoun County, Alabama and then moved to Mississippi.

On September 16, 1840, in Jacksonville, Alabama, Erasmus married Lucy Ann Morgan, the daughter of George Washington Morgan and Mary Frances Irby. By 1845 he was practicing medicine in Oktibbeha County, Mississippi, and became a member of the House of Representatives representing Oktibbeha County, and State Auditor. While chairman of the Committee on Claims and a member of the Committee of Education he was instrumental in founding the Mississippi Institution for the Education of the Deaf and Dumb in 1854.

== Civil War service ==
When the war broke out, Burt raised a unit for the Confederate side known as the "Burt Rifles," which became Company K of the 18th Mississippi Infantry Regiment on April 22, 1861, starting with the rank of captain. He was made a colonel on June 7, 1861. They first saw action at the First Battle of Manassas on July 21, 1861.

At the Battle of Ball's Bluff near Leesburg, Virginia, he led his men in an attack on a Union artillery battery, but his regiment was caught in a crossfire by nearby enemy infantry. Burt was shot through his hip by a bullet which entered his stomach. His men were so enraged by his loss that they helped drive the Federals into the Potomac River where a number of them drowned. He was taken into Harrison Hall in Leesburg, Virginia. Burt was promoted to general for his bravery, but died before the promotion was received. His body was taken back to Jackson, Mississippi, where he was buried. He had eight children, and after his death his wife and younger children were moved back to Alabama by his widow's family.

== Honors ==
There is an Erasmus Burt Award presented by the Mississippi Association of the Deaf.
