= Holly Springs, South Carolina =

Unincorporated community in South Carolina, US

Coordinates: 35°00′15″N 82°10′34″W

Holly Springs is an unincorporated community in Spartanburg County, in the U.S. state of South Carolina.

== History ==
The community derives its name from a nearby spring lined with holly.
