= Secretary of State of Mississippi =

Political position in Mississippi, United States

Mississippi Secretary of State
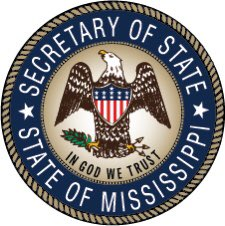
- Seal of the secretary of state

- Incumbent; Michael Watson since January 14, 2020
- Seat: Jackson, Mississippi
- Term length: Four years, unlimited renewal
- Precursor: Secretary of the Mississippi Territory
- Formation: December 11, 1817 (208 years ago)
- First holder: Daniel Williams
- Salary: $90,000
- Website: sos.ms.gov

The Mississippi secretary of state is an officer of Mississippi originally established under the Article IV, §14 of Mississippi Constitution of 1817, and was reestablished under Article V, §133 of the Mississippi Constitution of 1890.

Several African Americans served in the office during the Reconstruction era. The current secretary of state is Michael Watson.

== History ==
The Office of Secretary of State of Mississippi was initially created by the state's original 1817 constitution, which stipulated in Article IV, Section 14, "A Secretary of State shall be appointed, who shall continue in office during the term of two years. He shall keep a fair register of all the official acts and proceedings of the Governor, and shall, when required, lay the same, and all papers, minutes, and vouchers relative thereto, before the General Assembly, and shall perform such other duties as may be required by law." From its inception, the office was also responsible for receiving election results. The Mississippi Legislature initially elected the holders of the office, with the first secretary of state, Daniel Williams, being chosen on December 11, 1817. The 1832 constitution stipulated that the secretary was to be popularly elected to serve a two-year term. The 1869 constitution extended the term to four years. During the Reconstruction era from 1869 to 1878, the office was continuously held by black men.

The state's 1890 constitution modified the position in Article V, Section 133, stipulating, "There shall be a Secretary of State, who shall be elected as herein provided. He shall be at least twenty-five years of age, a citizen of the state five years preceding the day of his election, and he shall continue in office during the term of four years, and shall be keeper of the capitol; he shall keep a correct register of all official acts and proceedings of the Governor; and shall, when required, lay the same, and all papers, minutes, and vouchers relative thereto, before the Legislature, and he shall perform such other duties as may be required of him by law. He shall receive such compensation as shall be prescribed." The document also made the officer an ex officio member of the State Board of Education. In 1982 the constitution was amended, removing the secretary from the board effective July 1, 1984. In 1978 the legislature voted abolish the office of state land commissioner—which supervised public lands—and assign its responsibilities to the secretary of state effective January 1980. The secretary has been responsible for the publishing of the Mississippi Official and Statistical Register since 1931.

== Duties and responsibilities ==
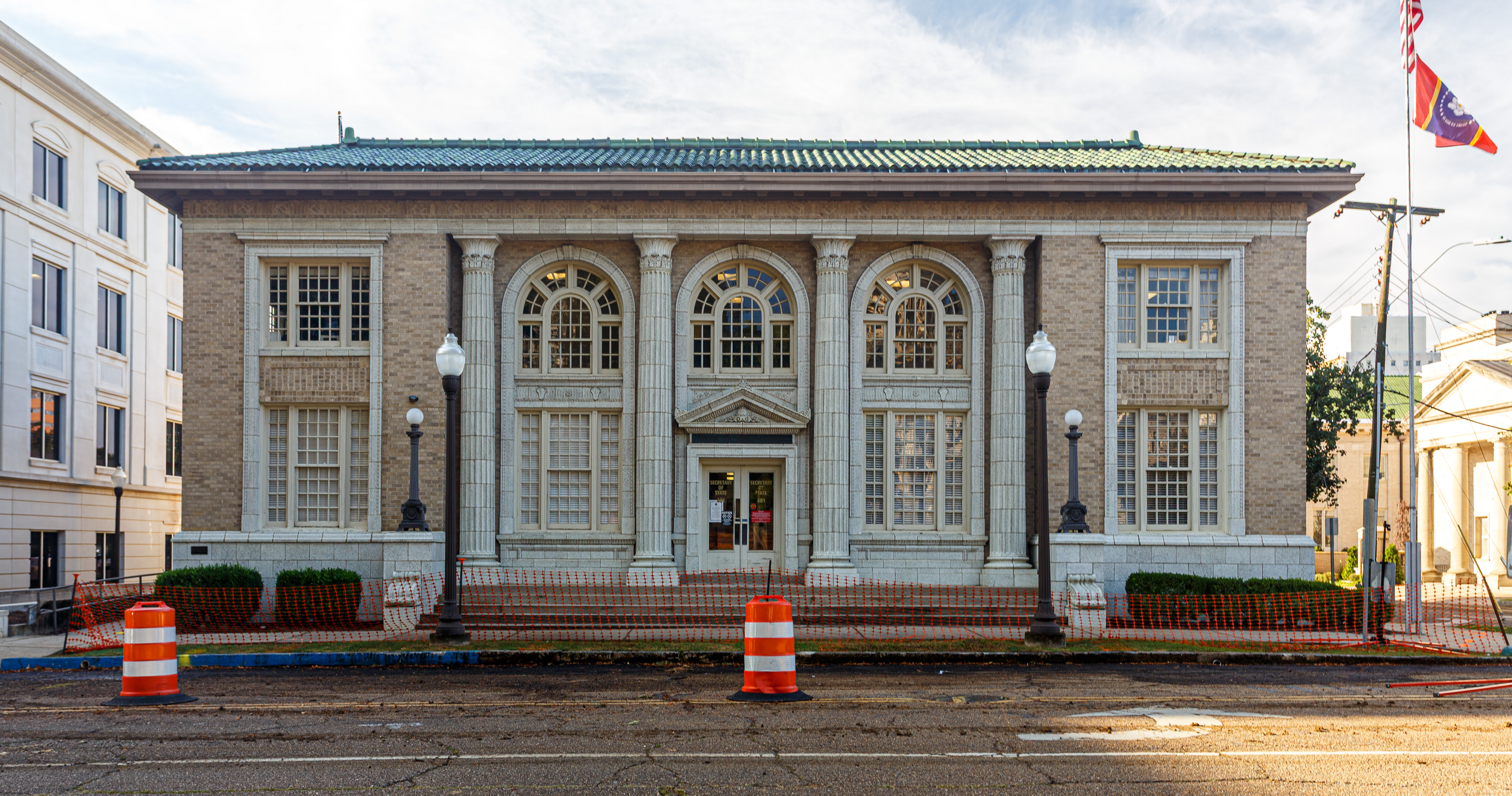
Heber Ladner Building, Jackson

The secretary of state is elected to serve a four-year term without term limits. The constitution designates the secretary as the "Keeper of the Capitol" and stipulates that they receive and maintain all election results. It also requires all state commissions to be "attested" by the secretary. Most of the specific duties of the office are determined by the State Legislature, including enforcing regulations for certain businesses, managing public lands, and publishing state documents.

The Office of the Secretary of State is composed of eight divisions:

- The Business Services & Regulation Division is responsible for chartering corporations and other business entities, registering liens under the Uniform Commercial Code, issuing apostilles, and regulating notaries public. This division also publishes the Mississippi Administrative Bulletin, which is the official gazette for all regulations made by state agencies.
- The Public Lands Division administers all public lands, including land forfeited in tax foreclosures, lands reserved for school use, tidelands held under the public trust doctrine, and lands held by state agencies.
- The Elections Division administers elections, and monitors campaign finance and lobbying activities.
- The Charities Division regulates charities and investigates charity fraud.
- The External Affairs Division oversees the office's relations with the state legislature and businesses in the state.
- The Policy and Research Division is responsible for reviewing and suggesting revisions to laws and policies administered by the secretary of state.
- The Publications Division oversees the office's educational outreach programs, manages its public relations, and issues state documents, such as the Official and Statistical Register.
- The Securities Division enforces the state's Uniform Securities Laws and investigates securities fraud.

The secretary's salary is $90,000 per year, but is set to increase to $120,000 annually in 2024. They maintain an office on the first floor of the Mississippi State Capitol. Additional offices are maintained at the Capital Towers and Ladner Building in Jackson, and in Biloxi, Southaven, and Tupelo.

== Secretaries of state ==
Secretary of State
No.	Secretary of State	Term in office	Party	Ref.
1	Daniel Williams	1817–1821		
2	John A. Grimball	1821–1833		
3	D. C. Dickson	1833–1835		
4	Barry W. Benson	1835–1839		
5	Thomas B. Woodward	1839–1841		
6	L. G. Galloway	1841–1843		
7	Wilson Hemingway	1843–1847		
8	Samuel Stamps	1847–1850		
9	Joseph Bell	1850–1852		
10	James A. Horne	1852–1854		
11	William H. Muse	1854–1855		
12	A. B. Dilworth	1855–1860		
13	B. R. Webb	1860		
14	Charles A. Brougher	1860–1865		
15	Alexander Warner	1865–1869	Republican	
16	Henry Musgrove	1869		
17	James D. Lynch	1869–1872	Republican	
18	Hiram Rhodes Revels	1872–1873	Republican	
19	H. C. Carter	1873	Republican	
20	M. M. McLeod	1873	Republican	
21	H. C. Carter	1873–1874	Republican	
22	James Hill	1874–1878	Republican	
23	Kinloch Falconer	1878	Democratic	
24	D. P. Porter	1878	Democratic	
25	Henry C. Myers	1878–1886	Democratic	
26	George M. Govan	1886–1896	Democratic	
27	John Logan Power	1896–1901	Democratic	
28	Joseph Withers Power	1901–1926	Democratic	
29	Walker Wood	1926–1948	Democratic	
30	Heber Austin Ladner	1948–1980	Democratic	
31	Ed Pittman	1980–1984	Democratic	
32	Dick Molpus	1984–1996	Democratic	
33	Eric Clark	1996–2008	Democratic	
34	Delbert Hosemann	2008–2020	Republican	
35	Michael Watson	2020–present	Republican	

== Works cited ==
- Busbee, Westley F. Jr. (2014). Mississippi: A History (second ed.). John Wiley & Sons. ISBN 9781118755921.
- Mississippi Official and Statistical Register 2016–2020. Jackson: Mississippi Secretary of State. 2017. OCLC 1045214160.
- Rowland, Dunbar, ed. (1904). The Official and Statistical Register of the State of Mississippi. Jackson: Mississippi Department of Archives and History. OCLC 777030828.
- Winkle, John W. III (2014). The Mississippi State Constitution (second ed.). Oxford University Press. ISBN 9780199300631.
