= List of first ladies of Mississippi =

List of wives of Mississippi Governors

The First Lady of the U.S. state of Mississippi is a role held by the wife of the Governor of Mississippi. Mississippi has never had a female governor.

The Musgroves announced they were divorcing and she was leaving the governor's mansion with their children.

The Mabuses also divorced.

	Picture	Name	When	Spouse of
1				David Holmes
2		Agatha Ball Chinn Poindexter	1820–1822	George Poindexter
3				Walter Leake
4		Betsy Stanton Chambers (second wife after Margaret Chambers Brandon)		Gerard Brandon
5				David Holmes
6				Gerard Brandon
7				Abram M. Scott
8				Charles Lynch
9				Hiram Runnels
10		Eliza Turner Quitman		John A. Quitman
11				Charles Lynch
12		Elizabeth Lewis Cameron McNutt, widow of his law partner		Alexander G. McNutt
13				Tilghman Tucker
14		Roberta Y. Brown (Roberta Eugenia Young Brown)		Albert G. Brown, his second wife after first died
15				Joseph W. Matthews
16				John A. Quitman
17				John Isaac Guion
18				James Whitfield
19				Henry S. Foote
20		Susan Hewell Pettus		John J. Pettus
21				John J. McRae
22				William McWillie
23				John J. Pettus
24				Charles Clark
25				William L. Sharkey
26				Benjamin G. Humphreys
27		Blanche Butler Ames	1868-1870	Adelbert Ames
28		Amelia Walton (Glover) Alcorn		James L. Alcorn
29				Ridgley C. Powers
30			1874–1876	Adelbert Ames
31		Mary G. Coman Stone		John Marshall Stone
32				Robert Lowry
33				John Marshall Stone
34				Anselm J. McLaurin
35		Marion Buckley Longino		Andrew H. Longino
36				James K. Vardaman
37		Alice Josephine Tye Noel	1908–1912	Edmond Noel
38				Earl L. Brewer
39		Linda Gaddy Bedgood Bilbo		Theodore G. Bilbo
40				Lee M. Russell
41				Henry L. Whitfield
42				Dennis Murphree
43				Theodore G. Bilbo
44				Martin Sennet Conner
45				Hugh L. White
46				Paul B. Johnson Sr.
47				Dennis Murphree
48				Thomas L. Bailey
49				Fielding L. Wright
48				Hugh L. White
49				James P. Coleman
50				Ross Barnett
51				Paul B. Johnson Jr.
52		Nellah Massey Bailey	1944 - 1946	Thomas L. Bailey
52		Nan Kelley Wright		Fielding L. Wright
51		Judith Wier Sugg White		Hugh L. White
52		Margaret Coleman		James P. Coleman
53		Mary Pearl Crawford Barnett		Ross Barnett
54		Dorothy Power Johnson		Paul B. Johnson Jr.
55				John Bell Williams
56		Ava Carroll Waller	1972 - 1976	Bill Waller
57		Zelma Finch		Cliff Finch
58		Elise Varner Winter	1980 - 1984	William F. Winter
59		Divorced		William Allain
60		Julie Hines Mabus		Ray Mabus
61		Pat Fordice	1992 - 1999	Kirk Fordice
62		Melanie Musgrove		Ronnie Musgrove
63		Marsha Barbour	2004 - 2012	Haley Barbour
64		Deborah (Hays) Bryant		Phil Bryant
65		Elee Williams Reeves		Tate Reeves

== See also ==
- List of governors of Mississippi
