= 1903 Mississippi gubernatorial election =

1903 Mississippi Democratic Party gubernatorial runoff
- August 27, 1903
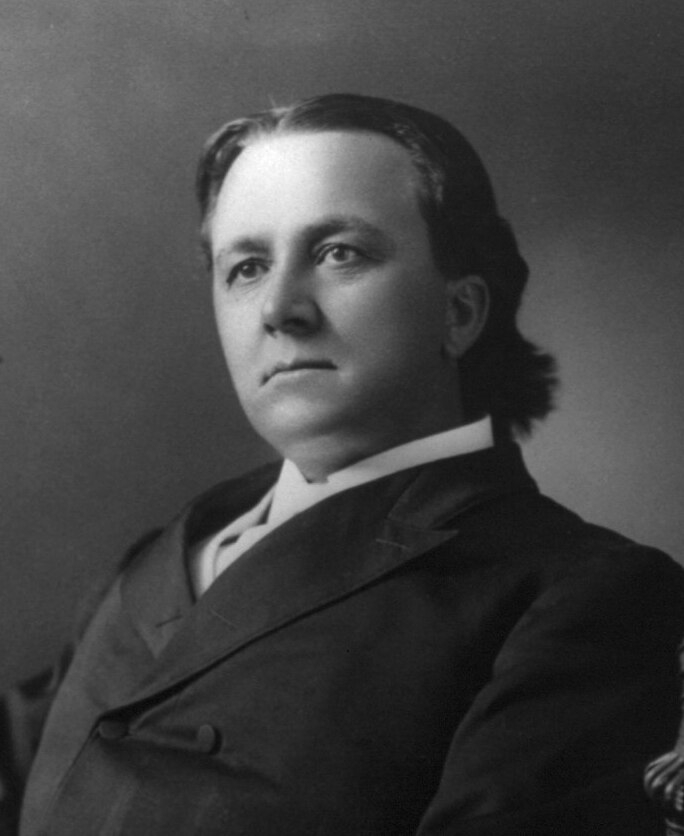

Nominee	James K. Vardaman	Frank A. Critz
Party	Democratic	Democratic
Popular vote	53,032	46,249
Percentage	53.42%	46.58%
County results
Vardaman
50–60%
60–70%
70–80%
80–90%
Critz
50–60%
60–70%
70–80%
80–90%
Governor before election
Andrew H. Longino
Democratic
Elected Governor
James K. Vardaman
Democratic

The 1903 Mississippi gubernatorial election took place on November 3, 1903, in order to elect the Governor of Mississippi. Incumbent Democrat Andrew H. Longino was term-limited, and could not run for reelection to a second term.

== Democratic primary ==
The Democratic primary election was held on August 6, 1903, with the runoff held on August 27, 1903.

=== Results ===
Mississippi Democratic gubernatorial primary, 1903
Party	Candidate	Votes	%
Democratic	James K. Vardaman	39,679	40.19%
Democratic	Frank A. Critz	34,813	35.26%
Democratic	Edmond Noel	24,233	24.55%
Total votes		98,725	100.00%

Mississippi Democratic gubernatorial primary runoff, 1903
Party	Candidate	Votes	%
Democratic	James K. Vardaman	53,032	53.42%
Democratic	Frank A. Critz	46,249	46.58%
Total votes		99,281	100.00%

== General election ==
In the general election, Democratic candidate James K. Vardaman, a former state senator, ran unopposed.

=== Results ===
Mississippi gubernatorial election, 1903
Party	Candidate	Votes	%
Democratic	James K. Vardaman	32,191	100.00
Total votes		32,191	100.00
Democratic hold			
