= Vardaman =

Vardaman can refer to:

- James K. Vardaman (1861–1930), American politician from the U.S. state of Mississippi
- James K. Vardaman Jr. (1894–1972), American lawyer from Mississippi who served as the governor of the Federal Reserve System from 1946 to 1958
- Vardaman, Mississippi, a town in the Southern United States
- Vardaman Bundren, a character in As I Lay Dying (1930), a novel by William Faulkner
- Ipomoea batatas cv. Vardaman, a variety of sweet potato cultivated in the United States
