= Luther Manship =

American politician

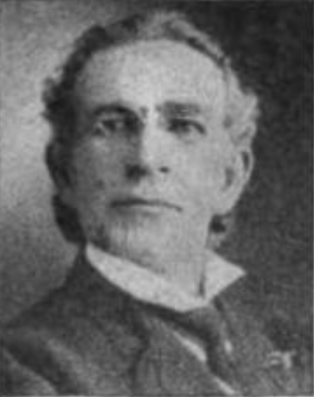

Lieutenant Governor of Mississippi
- In office 1908–1912
- Governor: Edmond Noel

Member of the Mississippi House of Representatives
- In office 1896

Personal details
- Born: April 16, 1853 Jackson, Mississippi
- Died: April 22, 1915 (aged 62) Jackson, Mississippi
- Resting place: Greenwood Cemetery
- Party: Democratic
- Spouse: Mary Belmont Phelps (m. 1881)
- Education: University of North Carolina at Chapel Hill
- Occupation: Lawyer, politician

Luther Manship (April 16, 1853 - April 22, 1915) was an American politician. He served as the Lieutenant-Governor of Mississippi under Governor Edmond Noel.

== Biography ==
Luther Manship was born on April 16, 1853, in Jackson, Mississippi. He was the son of Charles Henry Manship, mayor of Jackson, and Adaline Dailey. He attended Jackson's public schools. He was an apprentice for the Illinois Central Railroad in McComb, and served as an engineer. He was a City Council member of Macon from 1880 to 1881. He married Mary Belmont Phelps in 1881. He was a member of Jackson's City Council from 1885 to 1895.

He was elected to the Mississippi House of Representatives in 1895 and served from 1896 to 1900. He reached his highest political office when he served as the state's lieutenant governor under Edmond Noel from 1908 to 1912.

He died at his home in Jackson on April 22, 1915, and was buried in Greenwood Cemetery.

Political offices
Preceded by John P. Carter	Lieutenant Governor of Mississippi; 1908–1912	Succeeded by Theodore G. Bilbo
