= 1907 Mississippi gubernatorial election =

1907 Mississippi Democratic Party gubernatorial runoff
- November 5, 1907
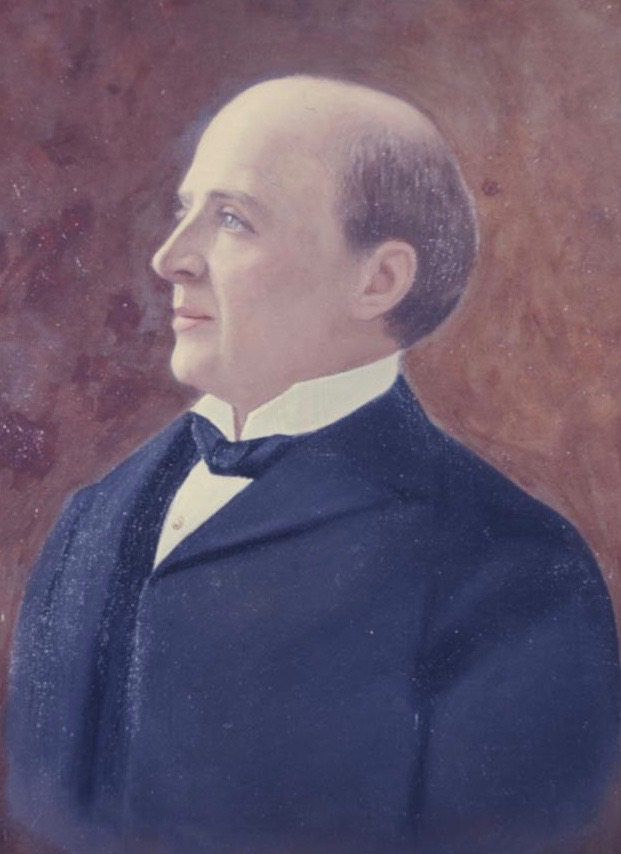

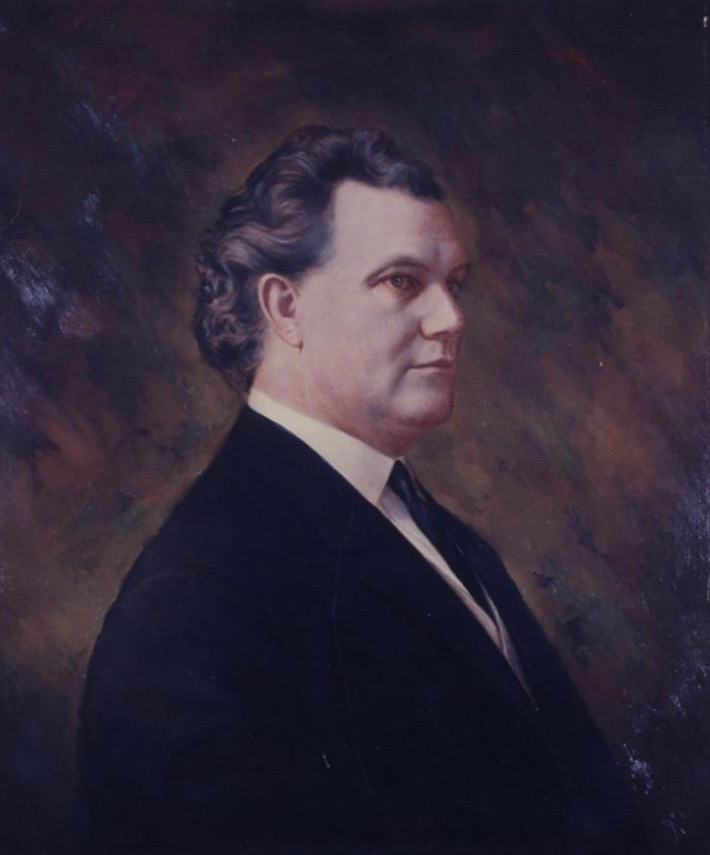
Nominee	Edmond Noel	Earl L. Brewer
Party	Democratic	Democratic
Popular vote	58,407	56,405
Percentage	50.87%	49.13%
- County results Noel: 50–60% 60–70% 70–80% Brewer: 50–60% 60–70% 70–80%
Governor before election
James K. Vardaman
Democratic
Elected Governor
Edmond Noel
Democratic

The 1907 Mississippi gubernatorial election took place on November 5, 1907, in order to elect the Governor of Mississippi. Incumbent Democrat James K. Vardaman was term-limited, and could not run for reelection to a second term.

== Democratic primary ==
The Democratic primary election was held on August 1, 1907, with the runoff held on August 22, 1907.

=== Results ===
Mississippi Democratic gubernatorial primary, 1907
Party	Candidate	Votes	%
Democratic	Edmond Noel	29,380	24.16
Democratic	Earl L. Brewer	28,111	23.11
Democratic	Charles Scott	26,941	22.15
Democratic	Thomas U. Sisson	20,107	16.53
Democratic	Jeff Truly	15,687	12.90
Democratic	Emmet N. Thomas	1,394	1.15
Total votes		121,620	100.00

Mississippi Democratic gubernatorial primary runoff, 1907
Party	Candidate	Votes	%
Democratic	Edmond Noel	58,407	50.87
Democratic	Earl L. Brewer	56,405	49.13
Total votes		114,812	100.00

== General election ==
In the general election, Democratic candidate Edmond Noel, a former state senator, ran unopposed.

=== Results ===
Mississippi gubernatorial election, 1907
Party	Candidate	Votes	%
Democratic	Edmond Noel	29,528	100.00
Total votes		29,528	100.00
Democratic hold			
