= Governor Brewer =

Governor Brewer may refer to:

- Albert Brewer (1928–2017), 47th Governor of Alabama
- Earl L. Brewer (1869–1942), 38th Governor of Mississippi
- Jan Brewer (born 1944), 22nd Governor of Arizona
