= Herman Hines =

American banker and soldier (1914 – 2010)

J. Herman Hines
- Born: James Herman Hines; September 8, 1914; Jackson, Mississippi, U.S.
- Died: May 10, 2010 (aged 95)
- Education: Central High School; Louisiana University School of Banking; Jackson School of Law; Harvard Advanced Management Program
- Occupations: Banker and civic leader
- Years active: 1936–1942; 1946–1979
- Employer: Deposit Guaranty Bank & Trust Company
- Title: Chairman and chief executive officer of Deposit Guaranty National Bank
- Spouses: Martha Hamilton Hines; Bess Shirley Hines
- Children: 3, including Julie Hines Mabus
- Relatives: Ray Mabus (former son-in-law)
- Military career
- Allegiance: United States
- Branch: United States Army
- Service years: 1942–1946
- Rank: Lieutenant colonel
- Unit: Quartermaster Corps
- Conflict: World War II

James Herman Hines (September 8, 1914 – May 10, 2010), commonly known as J. Herman Hines, was an American banker, United States Army officer, and civic leader based in Jackson, Mississippi. He spent nearly four decades with Deposit Guaranty Bank & Trust Company, later Deposit Guaranty National Bank, beginning as a clerk and part-time runner in 1936 and retiring in 1979 as chairman of the board and chief executive officer.

Hines served in the Pacific theater during World War II and was honorably discharged with the rank of lieutenant colonel. He also helped establish the Mississippi Higher Education Assistance Corporation and the Education Services Foundation, organizations created to expand access to postsecondary education in Mississippi. The Education Services Foundation was later renamed the Woodward Hines Education Foundation in recognition of Hines and Millsaps College administrator Jack Woodward.

== Early life and education ==
Hines was born in Jackson on September 8, 1914, one of eight children of Hulon Hunter Hines and Ione Odom Hines. He graduated from Central High School in 1932. After graduation, he worked for the Morris Ice Company before joining Deposit Guaranty Bank & Trust Company in 1936 as a clerk and part-time runner.

During his banking career, Hines attended the Louisiana University School of Banking, the Jackson School of Law, now associated with the Mississippi College School of Law, and the Advanced Management Program at Harvard Business School. After retiring from Deposit Guaranty, he attended courses at Millsaps College and the University of Oxford.

== Military service ==
Hines entered the United States Army in 1942 and attended Officer Candidate School at Camp Lee, Virginia.

In 1943, he was stationed at Schofield Barracks in the Territory of Hawaii, where he was assigned to Company B of the 256th Quartermaster Battalion and served as company commander. In December 1943, he was reassigned to the 3260th Quartermaster Service Company at Lower Kalihi on Oahu.

Hines was promoted to captain on May 22, 1944, pursuant to paragraph 27 of Special Orders No. 143. By September 1945, he was serving as commanding officer of the 545th Quartermaster Depot Company. On September 5, 1945, he was listed aboard the high-speed transport USS Lloyd (APD-63) during his return to the United States.

He was honorably discharged with the rank of lieutenant colonel and returned to Jackson in 1946, when he resumed his career with Deposit Guaranty.

== Banking career ==
Hines worked for Deposit Guaranty from 1936 until entering military service in 1942 and again from 1946 until his retirement in 1979. In 1950, he was elected assistant vice president and appointed manager of the bank's newly opened State Street branch in Jackson.

In 1973, Hines was elected president and chief operating officer of Deposit Guaranty National Bank. He later became chairman and chief executive officer of the bank. He retired in 1979. After retirement, he continued to maintain an office at the bank and assist employees and customers until 2010.

== Educational and civic activities ==
Hines and Jack Woodward were instrumental in creating the nonprofit Mississippi Higher Education Assistance Corporation and later the Education Services Foundation. The organizations were formed to improve access to higher education and financial assistance for Mississippi students. In 2017, the Education Services Foundation was renamed the Woodward Hines Education Foundation in honor of Hines and Woodward.

Hines served on the Millsaps College Board of Trustees from 1974 until his death in 2010 and was named a life trustee in 2001. He also served as president of the Jackson Symphony Board. In a 1982 oral-history interview, conductor Lewis Dalvit recalled that the orchestra reached its goal of a $100,000 annual budget during Hines's presidency, placing it among the nation's 100 largest orchestras at the time.

His other civic roles included chairman of the United Way, president of the Mississippi chapter of the American Heart Association, vice chairman of the Mississippi Ballet International Board of Trustees, and service with St. Dominic Hospital, Piney Woods Country Life School, Jackson State University, the Jackson Chamber of Commerce, and Entergy.

The Mississippi Legislature stated that Hines served on the Jackson Bi-Racial Committee during the desegregation of Jackson's public schools and supported organizations including the United Negro College Fund, the American Red Cross, the American Cancer Society, the YMCA, the YWCA, and the Mississippi Foundation of Independent Colleges.

Hines was a founding member of St. James' Episcopal Church in Jackson. He served as treasurer of the Episcopal Diocese of Mississippi for 42 years and sang in the church choir for 52 years.

== Honors ==
Hines received an honorary Master of Laws degree from the Mississippi College School of Law and honorary Doctor of Laws degrees from Tougaloo College and Millsaps College. Millsaps awarded him its Doctor of Laws degree during the 1978–1979 academic year. His other honors included the Exchange Club's Golden Deed Award and the Episcopal Foundation's Mississippi Humanitarian Award.

== Personal life and death ==
Hines was first married to Martha Hamilton Hines. They had three daughters: Martha Hines Botts, Linda Hines Broadus, and Julie Hines Mabus. Following Martha Hines's death, he married Bess Shirley Hines, who also predeceased him.

Julie Hines Mabus married Ray Mabus and served as first lady of Mississippi during his term as governor from 1988 to 1992. She was also his spouse during his service as United States ambassador to Saudi Arabia from 1994 to 1996.

Hines died from cancer on May 10, 2010, at the home of his daughter Martha Hines Botts in College Station, Texas. He was 95. His funeral was held at St. James' Episcopal Church, and his remains were placed in the church's columbarium.

== Legacy ==
Following Hines's death, the Mississippi Legislature adopted Senate Concurrent Resolution 506, commemorating his banking career, military service, philanthropy, and civic activities.

The Woodward Hines Education Foundation continues to bear the names of Hines and Woodward. In 2020, the foundation gave Millsaps College $100,000 to establish an endowed scholarship for students transferring from Mississippi community colleges. A 1980 portrait of Hines by Mississippi journalist and photographer Wilson F. Minor is held by the Mississippi State University Libraries' Archives and Special Collections Division.
