= Edmond Noel =

37th Governor of Mississippi (1856–1927)

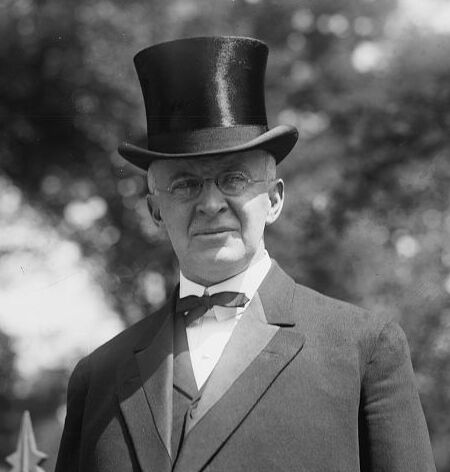
- Noel c. 1908

37th Governor of Mississippi
- In office January 21, 1908 – January 16, 1912
- Lieutenant: Luther Manship
- Preceded by: James K. Vardaman
- Succeeded by: Earl L. Brewer

Member of the Mississippi Senate
- In office 1895-1899; 1920

Member of the Mississippi House of Representatives

Personal details
- Born: Edmond Favor Noel; March 4, 1856 near Lexington, Mississippi, U.S.
- Died: July 30, 1927 (aged 71) Lexington, Mississippi, U.S.
- Party: Democratic
- Spouse(s): Loula Hoskins (m. 1890); Alice Tye Neilson (m. 1905)
- Profession: Lawyer

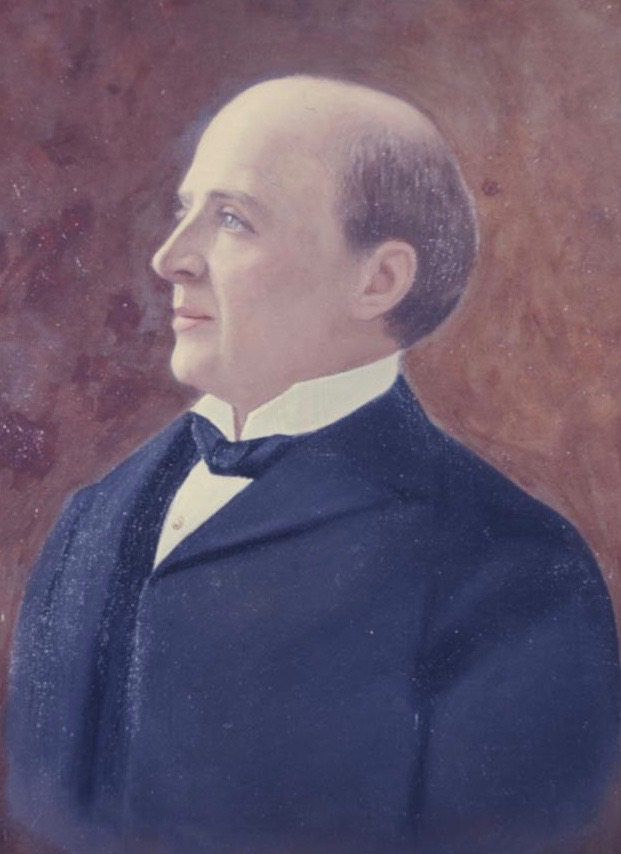
Noel's Governors portrait

Edmund Favor Noel (March 4, 1856 – July 30, 1927) was an American attorney and progressive politician who served as governor of Mississippi from 1908 to 1912. The son of an early planter family in Mississippi, he became a member of the Democratic Party.

Noel was elected to the state house, as a district attorney, and to the state senate before winning an election as governor in 1907. As governor, he achieved gains in support for farmers, labor legislation, and public education, while also establishing a state charity hospital. After his tenure, he was re-elected to the state senate.

== Early life, family and education ==
Edmond Favor Noel was born on March 4, 1856, on his family's farm in Holmes County, Mississippi. Edmond was named after his paternal grandfather, Edmund Faver Noel. (Note: There is a lack of consistency in how Noel's first name is spelled in both records and media during his lifetime and in posthumous commemorative displays, with some sources styling it as "Edmund"—like his grandfather—or as "Edmond".)Edmond is the correct spelling. I think history has confused him on accounts for his grandfather.

During the American Civil War, Noel's father served in the Confederate States Army and was eventually imprisoned. After the war, Noel moved to Louisville, Kentucky, to live with his maternal uncle, attorney David Sanders. After finishing high school, Noel read law under Sanders before returning to Mississippi in 1877. He passed the state bar and opened law practice in Lexington.

== Political career ==
In 1881, Noel was elected to a seat in the Mississippi House of Representatives. In 1887, he was elected as a district attorney.

In 1890 the Democratic-dominated legislature passed a new constitution with provisions that disenfranchised most African Americans by raising barriers to voter registration. White Democrats maintained this exclusion of blacks from politics through much of the 1960s in the state. These actions crippled the Republican Party in the state, whose members had been primarily made up of newly enfranchised African-American freedmen after the Civil War.

In 1895 Noel was elected to the Mississippi State Senate. He served in the U.S. Army in the Spanish–American War (1898). He was re-elected to the state senate in 1899. By the turn of the 20th century, Mississippi was a de facto one-party state under the firm control of the Democratic Party. With no meaningful opposition in general elections from the Republican Party, who held public office was effectively determined by who was nominated by the Democratic Party. Such nominations were decided in party conventions, which tended to be dominated by wealthy planters, bankers, and traders. Upon joining the State Senate, Noel began advocating for a law requiring party's to employ primary elections to select their candidates, as such a reform would ensure more popular participation in the political process. He also later stated that he feared public discontent with the convention system would destabilize white supremacy in Mississippi's political system.

In 1899, Andrew H. Longino was elected governor of Mississippi. He advocated for the adoption of a primary law in 1900, and while a bill to that effect passed the Senate, it did not succeed in the House. At the beginning of the 1902 legislative session, Noel introduced a bill which required all party nominations to be determined by primary elections, and called for a run-off contest to be held in the instance of no contender garnering a majority of the votes on the first ballot. The bill was successful and signed into law in March. The law also allowed a party's leadership to determine who was eligible to vote in their primaries, and in 1903, the Mississippi Democratic Party's Executive Committee voted to restrict eligibility to include only white voters. Accordingly, the law led to the exclusion of blacks from meaningful input in Mississippi's politics while also driving future candidates to appeal more to regular white voters.

In 1903, Noel retired from the State Senate and launched a campaign for the office of governor. In the Democratic primary he faced F. A. Critz, a Civil War veteran, and James K. Vardaman, a newspaper editor. Vardaman and Critz advanced to the primary run-off, which the former won.

In 1907, Noel won the Democratic primary and was elected Governor of Mississippi. He achieved numerous progressive reforms, including in education. These reforms included consolidation of the state's rural school districts, the establishment of agricultural high schools for whites, and the founding of a teacher's college in Hattiesburg (restricted to white students). Noel's administration also gained passage of laws regulating child labor, establishing statewide prohibition of alcohol, founding of a state charity hospital, and establishing pure food laws. The first session of the legislature in 1908, according to one study, “resulted in the largest number of progressive laws that one session had enacted up to that time, and marked the beginning of a new epoch in legislation.”

The business community in Jackson had recommended that both the 66-year-old Governor's Mansion and the Old Capitol be demolished and the sites redeveloped for commercial use. Noel and his wife Alice worked together to promote the preservation and renovation of the mansion. Through their efforts, it received its first major renovation and was updated for continued use.

After the end of his term, Noel continued to be active in state politics. In 1918, he was unsuccessful in his run for the United States Senate, which was newly based on popular voting. Since the adoption of the 17th Amendment in 1913, U.S. senators were elected for the first time that year by popular vote rather than by state legislatures. Noel ranked third; both he and the incumbent, populist U.S. Senator James K. Vardaman, lost to Pat Harrison. Blacks were still effectively disenfranchised and excluded from voting.

In 1920, Noel was elected again to the Mississippi State Senate, serving until he died in 1927.

== Personal life and death ==
Noel married Loula Hoskins in 1890. They had children together, including sons, before her death.

He married again in 1905 to Alice Josephine Tye Neilson, who had two sons from a previous marriage. She served as First Lady when Noel was governor. She aided him in working to preserve and renovate the Governor's Mansion.

After his death in July 1927, Noel was buried at Odd Fellows Cemetery in Lexington, Mississippi. His wife, Alice Noel, was buried there after her death in 1933.

== Works cited ==
- Nash, Jere (2019). "Edmund Favor Noel (1908–1912) and the Rise of James K. Vardaman and Theodore G. Bilbo" (PDF). The Journal of Mississippi History. LXXXI (1–2): 3–22. ISSN 0022-2771.

Party political offices
Preceded by James K. Vardaman	Democratic nominee for Governor of Mississippi; 1907	Succeeded by Earl L. Brewer
Political offices
Preceded by James K. Vardaman	Governor of Mississippi; 1908–1912	Succeeded by Earl L. Brewer
