= 1918 United States Senate election in Mississippi =

1918 U.S. Senate Democratic primary in Mississippi
- August 20, 1918
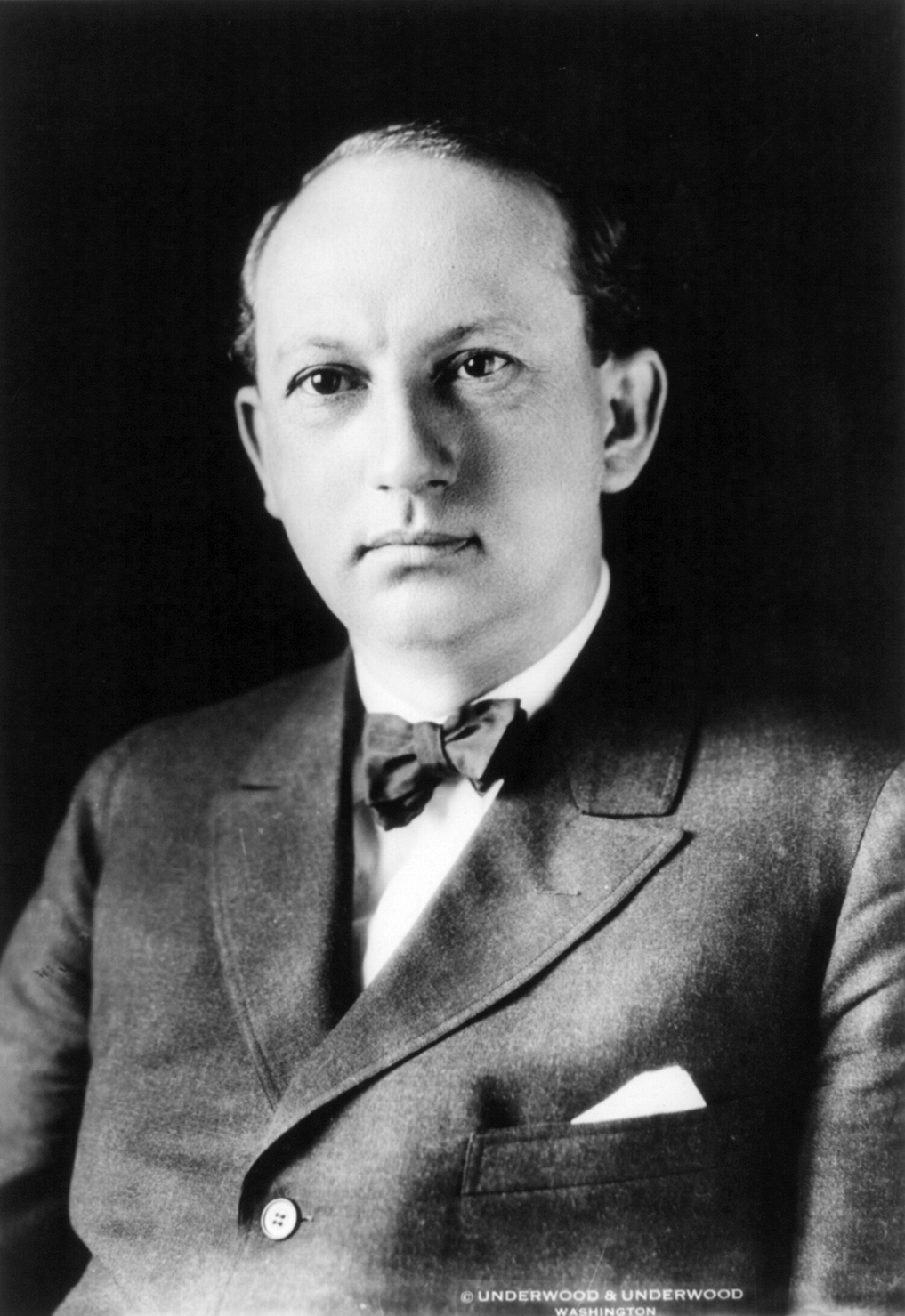

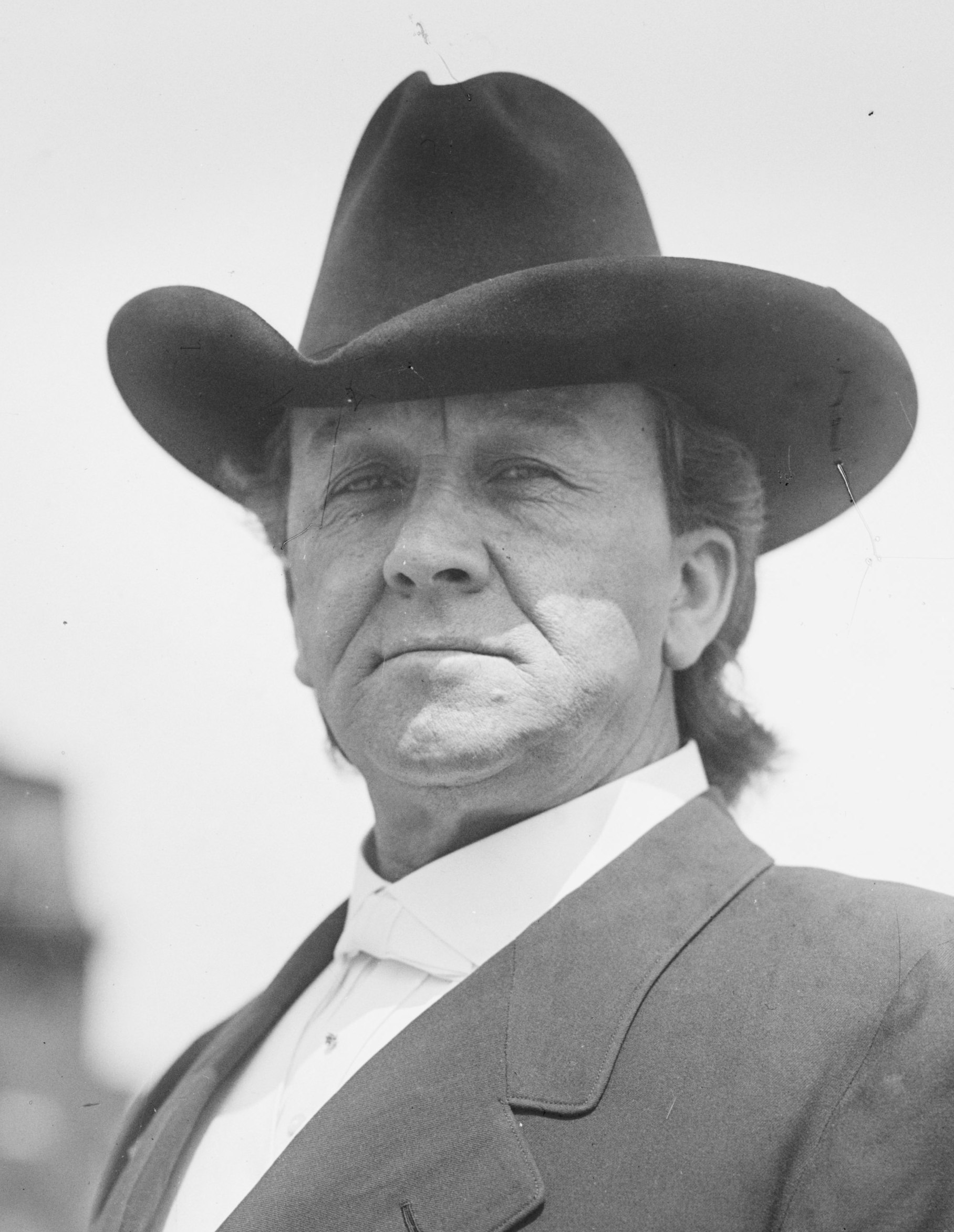

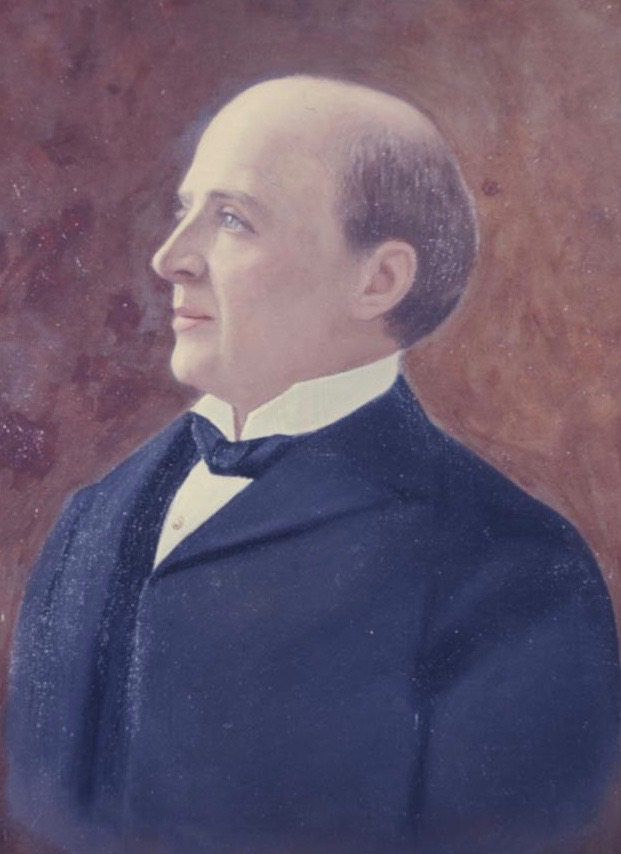
Nominee	Pat Harrison	James K. Vardaman	Edmond Noel
Party	Democratic	Democratic	Democratic
Popular vote	56,715	44,154	6,730
Percentage	52.71%	41.04%	6.26%
- County results Harrison: 40–50% 50–60% 60–70% 70–80% 80–90% Vardaman: 40–50% 50–60% 60–70% 70–80% Noel: 50–60%
U.S. senator before election
James K. Vardaman
Democratic
Elected U.S. Senator
Pat Harrison
Democratic

The 1918 United States Senate election in Mississippi was held on November 3, 1918. Incumbent Democratic U.S. Senator James K. Vardaman ran for re-election to a second term in office, but was defeated in the Democratic primary by U.S. Representative Pat Harrison.

Because Harrison faced only nominal opposition in the general election, his victory in the August 20 primary was tantamount to election.

== Background ==
In 1911, former Governor of Mississippi James K. Vardaman challenged and defeated Senator LeRoy Percy in the Democratic Party primary election, the first in state history. The victory established Vardaman and Theodore Bilbo as the uncontested leaders of the state Democratic Party. Vardaman established a reputation as a populist opponent of the state's planter elite and a white supremacist critic of the Theodore Roosevelt administration on racial issues.

In 1917, Vardaman stirred controversy by voting with the six-person minority against the United States declaration of war on Germany, defying President Woodrow Wilson and the vast majority of Southern sentiment.

== Democratic primary ==
=== Candidates ===
- Pat Harrison, U.S. Representative from Gulfport
- Edmond Noel, former Governor of Mississippi (1908–12)
- James K. Vardaman, incumbent U.S. Senator since 1913

=== Campaign ===
Harrison ran with the public support of President Wilson, who opposed Vardaman over his vote against the war.

=== Results ===
1918 Democratic U.S. Senate primary
Party	Candidate	Votes	%
Democratic	Pat Harrison	56,715	52.71%
Democratic	James K. Vardaman (incumbent)	44,154	41.04%
Democratic	Edmond Noel	6,730	6.26%
Total votes		107,599	100.00%

== General election ==
=== Results ===
1918 U.S. Senate election in Mississippi
Party	Candidate	Votes	%	±%
Democratic	Pat Harrison	30,055	95.04%	▼4.96
Socialist	Sumner W. Rose	1,569	4.96%	N/A
Total votes		31,624	100.00%	

== See also ==
- 1918 United States Senate elections
