= Potsdam Conference =

1945 Allied meeting on the postwar world

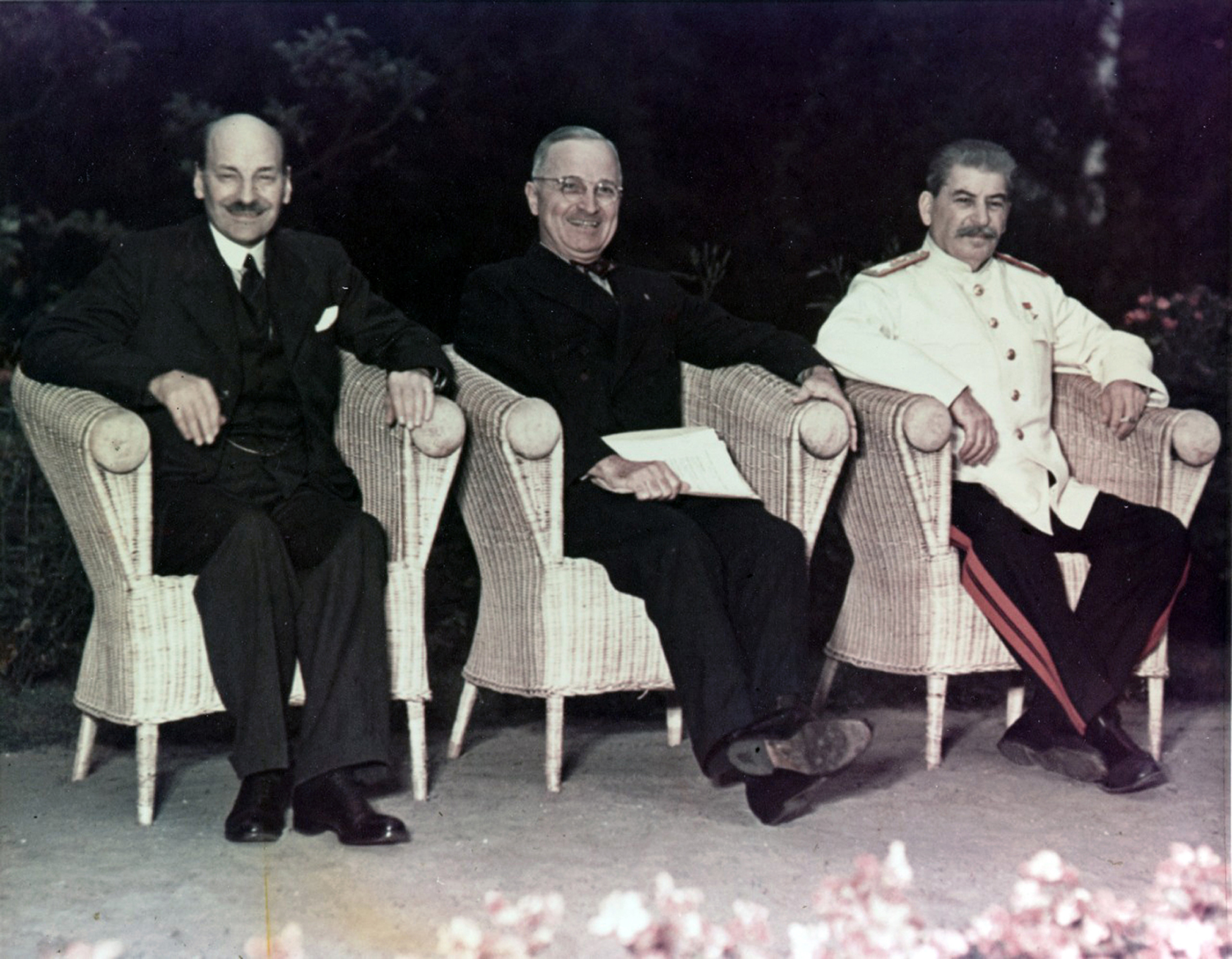
- The "Big Three" at the Potsdam Conference, Clement Attlee, Harry S. Truman, and Joseph Stalin
- Host country: Germany
- Date: 17 July – 2 August 1945
- Cities: Potsdam
- Venues: Cecilienhof
- Participants: (Soviet Union) Joseph Stalin (United Kingdom) Winston Churchill (United Kingdom) Clement Attlee (United States) Harry S. Truman
- Follows: Yalta Conference

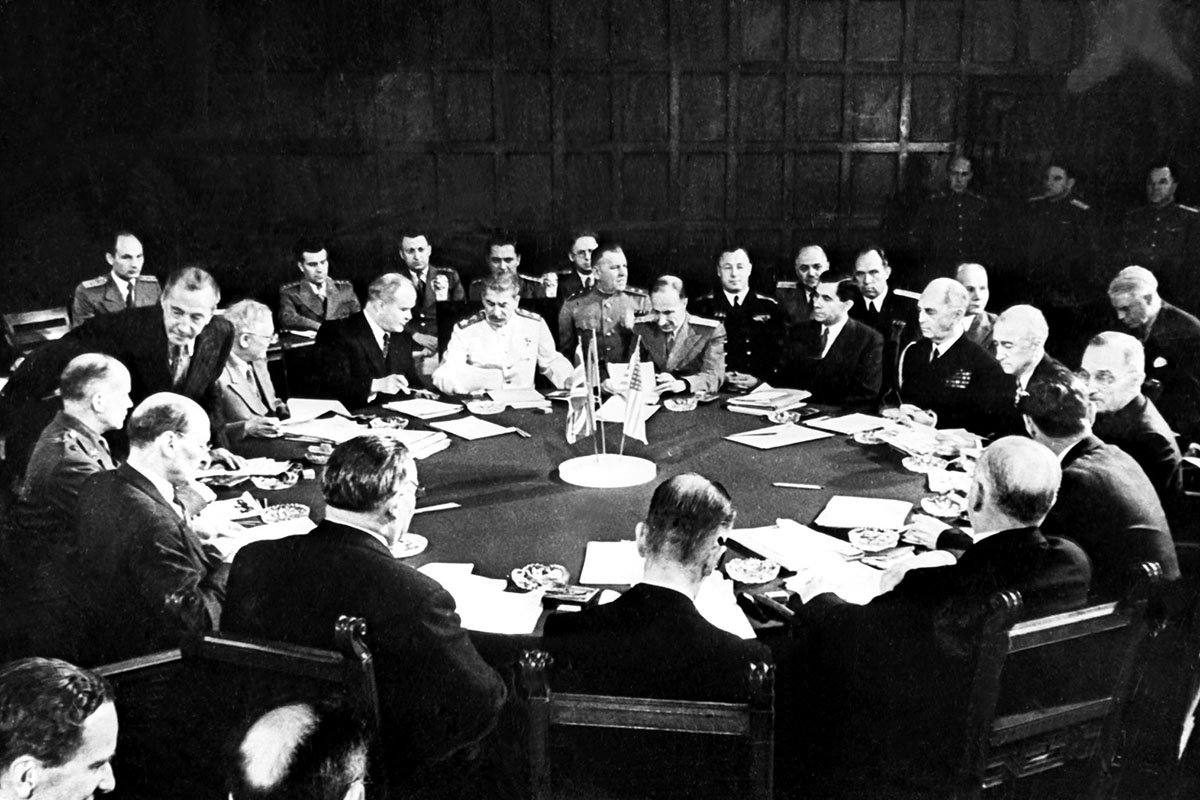
A conference session including Clement Attlee, Ernest Bevin, Joseph Stalin, Vyacheslav Molotov, William D. Leahy, Joseph E. Davies, James F. Byrnes, and Harry S. Truman

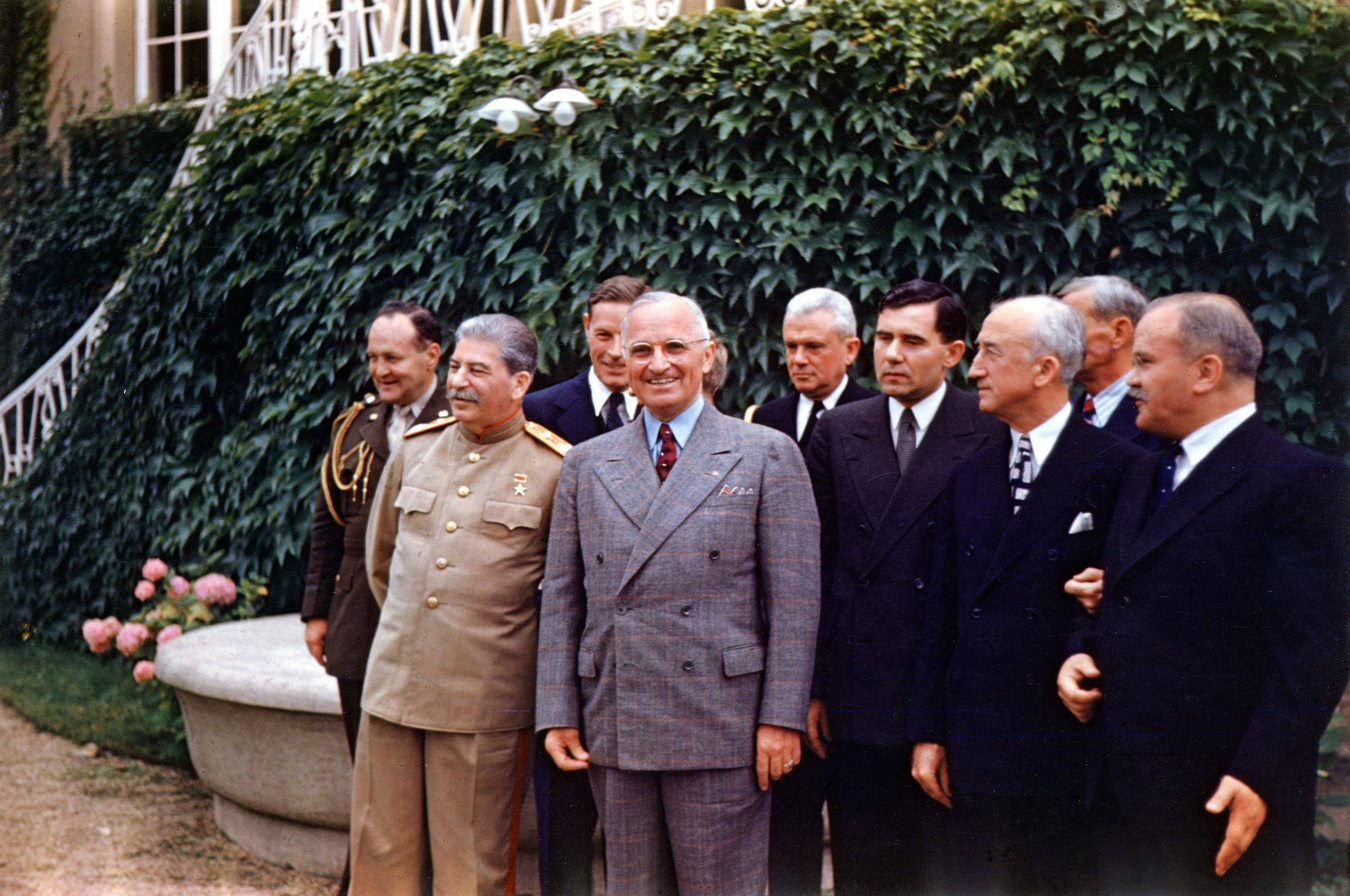
From left to right, first row: General Secretary Joseph Stalin; President Harry Truman, Soviet Ambassador to the United States Andrei Gromyko, Secretary of State James F. Byrnes, and Soviet Foreign Minister Vyacheslav Molotov. Second row: Brigadier General Harry H. Vaughan, Truman's confidant and military aide, Russian interpreter Charles Bohlen, Truman naval aide James K. Vardaman Jr., and (partially obscured) Charles Griffith Ross

Sitting (from left): Clement Attlee, Harry S. Truman, Joseph Stalin, and behind: Fleet Admiral William Daniel Leahy, Foreign Secretary Ernest Bevin, Secretary of State James F. Byrnes, and Foreign Minister Vyacheslav Molotov

The Potsdam Conference (German: Potsdamer Konferenz) was held at Potsdam in the Soviet occupation zone from 17 July to 2 August 1945, to allow the three leading Allies to plan the postwar peace, while avoiding the mistakes of the Paris Peace Conference of 1919. The participants were the Soviet Union, the United Kingdom, and the United States. They were represented respectively by General Secretary Joseph Stalin, prime ministers Winston Churchill and Clement Attlee, and President Harry S. Truman. They gathered to decide how to administer Germany, which had agreed to an unconditional surrender nine weeks earlier. The goals of the conference also included establishing the postwar order, solving issues on the peace treaty, and countering the effects of the war.

The foreign ministers and aides played key roles: Vyacheslav Molotov, Anthony Eden and Ernest Bevin, and James F. Byrnes. From 17 July to 25 July, nine meetings were held, when the Conference was interrupted for two days, as the results of the British general election were announced. By 28 July, Attlee had defeated Churchill and replaced him as Britain's representative, with Britain's new Secretary of State for Foreign Affairs, Ernest Bevin, replacing Anthony Eden. Four days of further discussion followed. During the conference, there were meetings of the three heads of government with their foreign secretaries, as well as meetings of only the foreign secretaries. Committees that were appointed by the latter for precursory consideration of questions before the conference also met daily. During the Conference, Truman was secretly informed that the Trinity test of the first atomic bomb on 16 July had been successful. He hinted to Stalin that the U.S. was about to use a new kind of weapon against the Japanese. Though this was the first time the Soviets had been officially given information about the atomic bomb, Stalin was already aware of the bomb project, having learned about it through espionage long before.

Key final decisions included the following: Germany would be divided into the four occupation zones (among the three powers and France) that had been agreed to earlier; Germany's eastern border was to be shifted west to the Oder–Neisse line; a Soviet-backed group was recognized as the legitimate government of Poland; and Vietnam was to be partitioned at the 16th parallel. The Soviets also reaffirmed their Yalta promise to promptly launch an invasion of Japanese-held areas.

Views were also exchanged on a plethora of other questions. However, consideration of those matters was postponed into the Council of Foreign Ministers, which the conference established. The conference ended with a stronger relationship among the three governments as a consequence of their collaboration, which renewed confidence that together with the other United Nations, they would ensure the creation of a just and enduring peace. Nevertheless, within 18 months relations had deteriorated and the Cold War had emerged.

== Preparation ==
In May 1945, Churchill wrote to Truman hoping to arrange a meeting of the three governments to occur in June. Truman hoped for Stalin to propose the meeting so as to avoid the appearance that the Americans and British were ganging up on the Soviets. With some prompting from Truman's aide Harry Hopkins, Stalin proposed a meeting in the Berlin area. Informed of this by the US, Churchill sent a letter agreeing that he'd be happy to meet in "what is left of Berlin".

Some sources suggest Truman delayed the conference in order for it to meet after the results of the first atomic bomb test were known. The conference was eventually set to begin on 16 July at Cecilienhof in Potsdam, near Berlin.

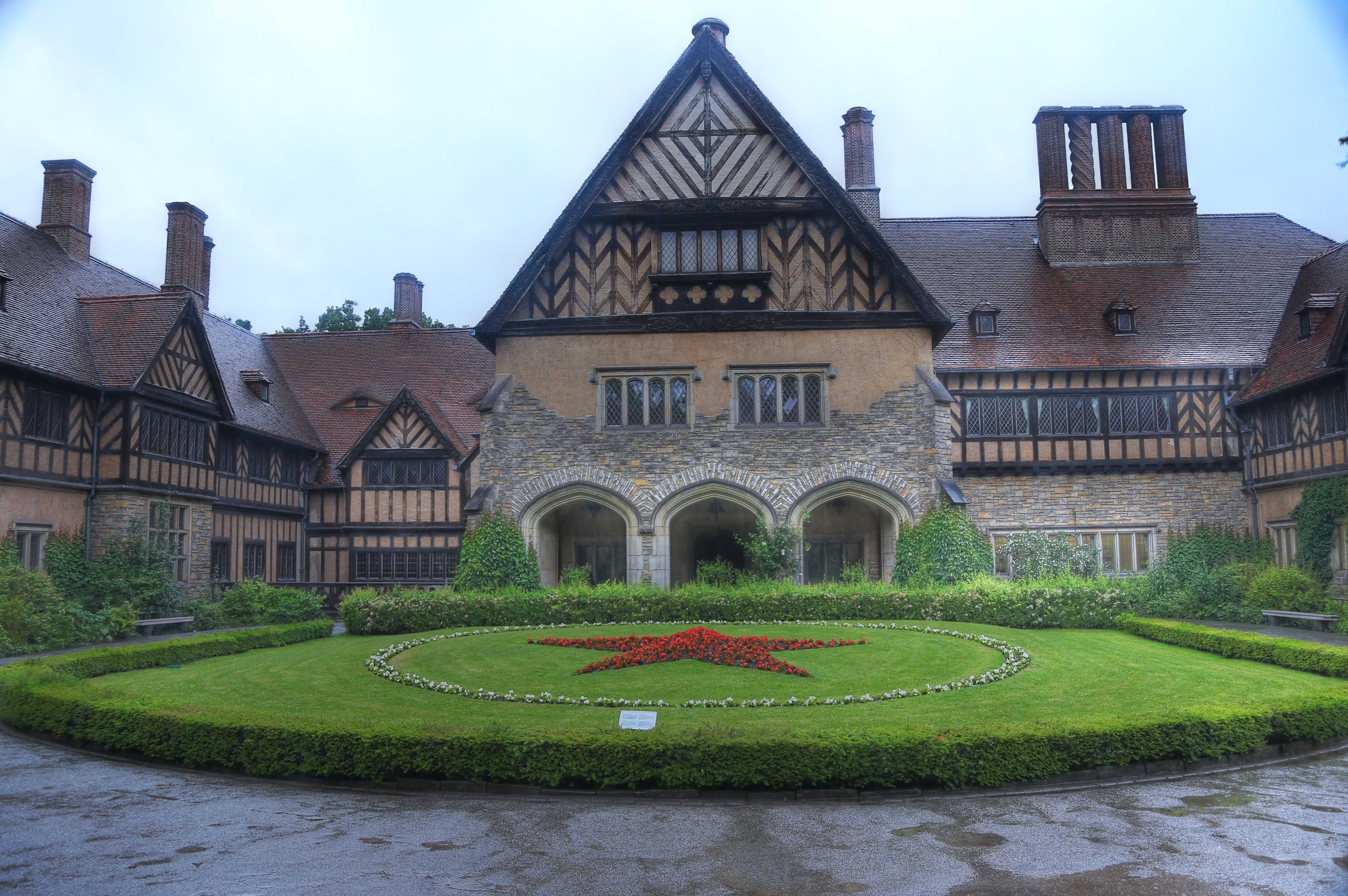
Cecilienhof, site of the Potsdam Conference, pictured in 2014

== Relationships among leaders ==
A number of changes had taken place in the five months since the Yalta Conference and greatly affected the relationships among the leaders. The Soviets occupied Central and Eastern Europe. The Baltic states were forcibly reincorporated into the USSR, while the Red Army also occupied Poland, Czechoslovakia, Hungary, Bulgaria, and Romania. Refugees fled from those countries. Stalin had set up a puppet communist government in Poland, insisted that his control of Eastern Europe was a defensive measure against possible future attacks, and claimed that it was a legitimate sphere of Soviet influence.

Winston Churchill, who had served for most of the war as British prime minister in a coalition government, was replaced during the conference by Clement Attlee. Churchill's government had a Soviet policy since the early 1940s that differed considerably from Franklin D. Roosevelt's and believed Stalin to be a "devil"-like tyrant, who led a vile system. A general election had been held in the United Kingdom on 5 July 1945, but its results were delayed to allow the votes of armed forces personnel serving overseas to be counted in their home constituencies. The outcome became known on 26 July during the conference, when Attlee became the new prime minister.

Roosevelt had died on 12 April 1945, and US Vice–President Harry Truman assumed the presidency, which saw VE Day (Victory in Europe) within a month and VJ Day (Victory in Japan) on the horizon.

William Bullitt had been ambassador to the Soviet Union until 1936, and ambassador to France until 1940, until having a falling out with Roosevelt and a demotion in the State Department. He later claimed Roosevelt told him in January 1943 with regards to potential Soviet domination over eastern Europe—"I just have a hunch that Stalin is not that kind of a man. ... I think that if I give him everything I possibly can and ask for nothing from him in return, 'noblesse oblige', he won't try to annex anything and will work with me for a world of democracy and peace." Bullitt wrote a memo criticizing FDR and his focus on Europe over Asia, which was published in the press in May 1943.

While a United States Senator and later as Vice President, Truman had closely followed the Allied progress of the war. George Lenczowski noted that "despite the contrast between his relatively modest background and the international glamour of his aristocratic predecessor, [Truman] had the courage and resolution to reverse the policy that appeared to him naive and dangerous," which was "in contrast to the immediate, often ad hoc moves and solutions dictated by the demands of the war." With the end of the war, the priority of Allied unity was replaced by the challenge of the relationship between the two emerging superpowers. Both leading powers continued to portray a cordial relationship to the public, but suspicion and distrust lingered between them. Despite this, on 17 July, the first day of the conference, Truman noted "I can deal with Stalin. He is honest—but smart as hell."

Truman was much more suspicious of the Soviets than Roosevelt had been and became increasingly suspicious of Stalin's intentions. Truman and his advisers saw Soviet actions in Eastern Europe as aggressive expansionism, which was incompatible with the agreements committed to by Stalin at Yalta in February. In addition, Truman became aware of possible complications elsewhere after Stalin had objected to Churchill's proposal for an Allied withdrawal from Iran ahead of the schedule that had been agreed at the Tehran Conference. The Potsdam Conference was the only time that Truman met Stalin in person.

At the Yalta Conference, France was granted an occupation zone within Germany. France was a participant in the Berlin Declaration and was to be an equal member of the Allied Control Council. Nevertheless, at the insistence of the Americans, Charles de Gaulle was not invited to Potsdam—just as he had been denied representation at Yalta—for fear that he would reopen the Yalta decisions. De Gaulle thus felt a diplomatic slight, which became a cause of deep and lasting resentment for him. Other reasons for the omission included the longstanding personal mutual antagonism between Roosevelt and de Gaulle, ongoing disputes over the French and American occupation zones, and the anticipated conflicts of interest over French Indochina. It also reflected the judgement of the British and the Americans that French aims, with respect to many items on the conference's agenda, were likely to contradict agreed-upon Anglo-American objectives.

== Agreements ==
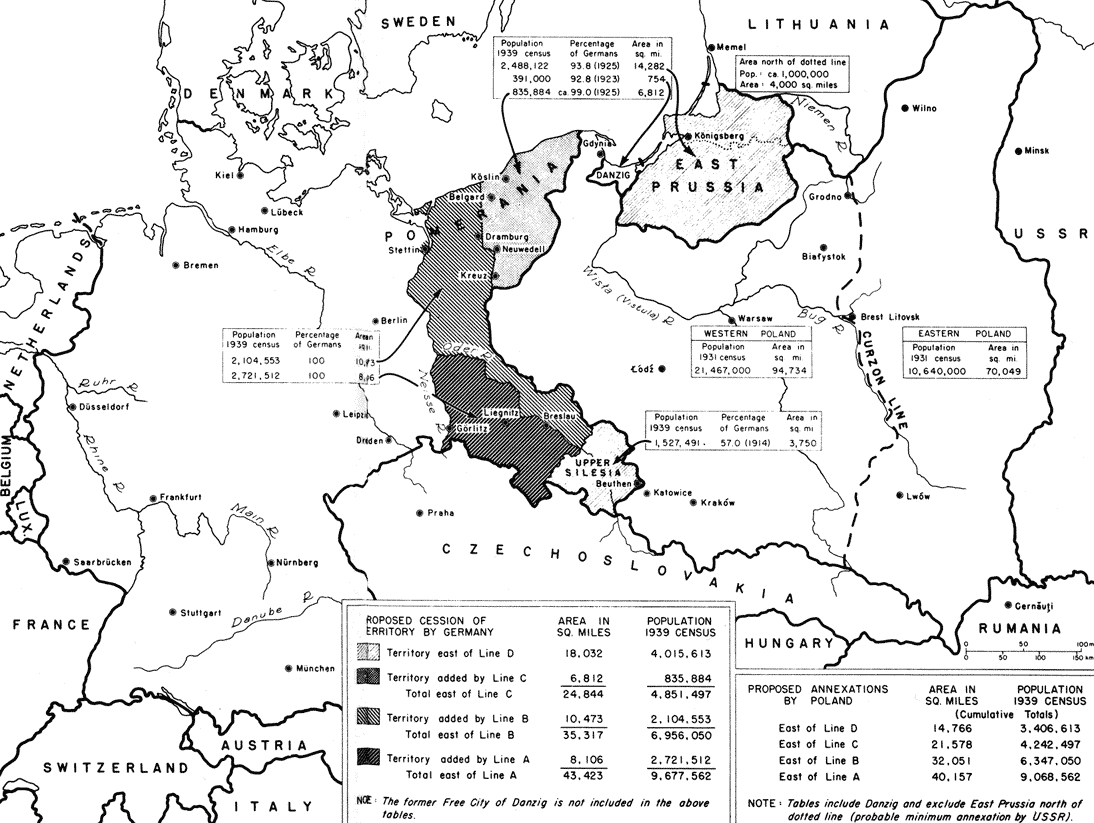
Demographics map used for the border discussions at the conference

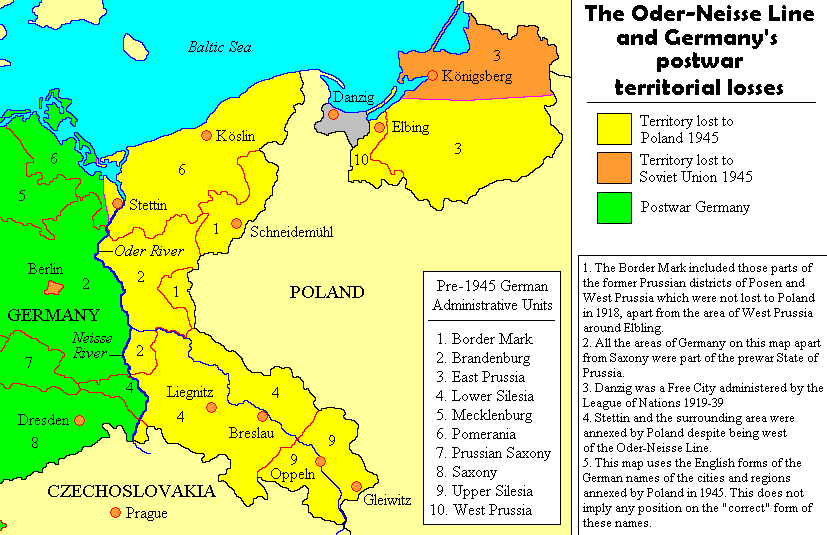
The Oder–Neisse line (click to enlarge)

At the end of the conference, the three heads of government agreed on the following actions. All other issues were to be resolved by the final peace conference, which was to be called as soon as possible.

=== Germany ===
- The Allies issued a statement of aims for their occupation of Germany: demilitarization, denazification, democratization, decentralization, dismantling, and decartelization. More specifically, as for the demilitarization and disarmament of Germany, the Allies decided to abolish the SS; the SA; the SD, the Gestapo; the air, land, and naval forces; and organizations, staffs, and institutions that were in charge of keeping alive the military tradition in Germany. Concerning the democratization of Germany, the "Big Three" thought it to be of great importance for the Nazi Party and its affiliated organizations to be destroyed. Thus, the Allies would prevent all Nazi activity and prepare for the reconstruction of German political life in a democratic state.
- All Nazi laws would be abolished, which established discrimination on grounds of race, creed, and political opinion and as a result could not be accepted in a democratic country.
- Both Germany and Austria were to be divided into four occupation zones, as had been agreed in principle at Yalta, and similarly, each capital (Berlin and Vienna) would be divided into four zones.
- Nazi war criminals were to be put on trial. Specifically, at the Potsdam Conference, the three governments tried to reach an agreement on trial methods for war criminals whose crimes under the Moscow Declaration of October 1943 had no geographical restriction. Meanwhile, the leaders were aware of ongoing weeks-long discussions in London between the representatives of the United States, the United Kingdom, France, and the Soviet Union. Their purpose was to bring the war criminals to trial as soon as possible and eventually to justice. The first list of defendants would be published before September 1. The leaders' objective was that the London negotiations would have a positive result validated by an agreement, which was signed in London on 8 August 1945.
- All German annexations in Europe were to be reversed, including the Sudetenland, Alsace-Lorraine, Austria, and the westernmost parts of Poland. This was an important policy in order to moderate the geopolitical ambitions of Germany in the post-war scenario.
- Germany's eastern border was to be shifted westwards to the Oder–Neisse line, which effectively reduced Germany in size by approximately 25% from its 1937 borders (and approximately 34% from its 1913 borders). The territories east of the new border were East Prussia, almost all of Silesia, West Prussia, and two thirds of Pomerania. The areas were mainly agricultural, with the exception of Upper Silesia, which was the second-largest centre of German heavy industry.
- expulsions of the German populations remaining beyond the new eastern borders of Germany were to be carried out from Poland, Czechoslovakia, and Hungary but not Yugoslavia.
- Nazi Party members who held public positions and who opposed postwar Allied aims were to be removed from office. They were to be replaced by those who, based on their political and moral beliefs, were in support of a democratic system.
- The German judicial system was to be reorganized based on democratic ideals of equality and justice under law.
- The German educational system was to be controlled to eliminate fascist doctrines and to develop democratic ideas.
- The Allies encouraged the existence of democratic parties in Germany with right of assembly and of public discussion.
- Freedoms of speech, press, religion, and religious institutions were to be respected. The formation of free trade unions was to be permitted as well.
- War reparations to the Soviet Union from its zone of occupation in Germany were agreed upon. In addition to the reparations, the Soviet Union would also receive reparations from the western zones of occupation, but it had to give up all claims on German industries in the western zones. Specifically, 15% of usable industrial capital equipment, consisting of metallurgical, chemical, and machine manufacturing industries, was to be removed from the western zones in exchange for food, coal, potash, zinc, timber, clay, and petroleum products from the eastern zones. The Soviet Union bore the responsibility of transferring the products from the eastern zone within five years. Moreover, 10% of the industrial capacity of the western zones unnecessary for the German peace economy were to be transferred to the Soviet Union within two years, without any obligation of further payment of any kind in return. The Soviet Union promised to settle the reparation claims of Poland from its own share of reparations. Stalin successfully proposed for Poland to be excluded from the division of German compensation and to be later granted 15% of the compensation given to the Soviet Union. The Soviet Union did not make any claims on gold captured by Allied troops in Germany.
- The conference concluded that it was necessary to set limits regarding the disposition and future use of the defeated German navy and of merchant ships. The American, British, and Soviet governments decided that they would assign experts to co-operate, which would soon lead to principles to be agreed upon and announced by the three governments.
- War reparations to the United States, the United Kingdom, and other countries would be received from their own zones of occupation, with the amounts to be determined within six months. The United States and the United Kingdom would give up all claims on German industries located in the eastern zone of occupation, as well as on German foreign assets in Bulgaria, Finland, Hungary, Romania, and eastern Austria. The removal of industrial equipment from the western zones to satisfy reparations was to be completed within two years from the determination of reparations. The Allied Control Council was to make the determination of the equipment following policies set by the Allied Commission and with the participation of France.
- The German standard of living was to be prevented from exceeding the European average. The types and amounts of industry to be dismantled to achieve that was to be determined later (see Allied plans for German industry after World War II).
- The German industrial war potential was to be destroyed by the destruction or control of all industries with military potential. To that end, all civilian shipyards and aircraft factories were to be dismantled or otherwise destroyed. All production capacity associated with war potential, such as metal, chemicals, or machinery factories, were to be reduced to a minimum level, which would later be determined by the Allied Control Commission. The manufacturing capacity thus made "surplus" was to be dismantled as reparations or otherwise destroyed. All research and international trade were to be controlled. The economy was to be decentralised by decartelisation and reorganised, with the primary emphasis on agriculture and peaceful domestic industries. In early 1946, an agreement was reached on the details of the latter in which Germany was to be converted into having an agricultural and light industrial economy. German exports were to be coal, beer, toys, textiles, etc., which would take the place of the heavy industrial products that had been most of Germany's prewar exports.

France, having been excluded from the conference, resisted implementing the Potsdam agreements within its occupation zone. In particular, the French refused to resettle any Germans expelled from the east. Moreover, the French did not accept any obligation to abide by the Potsdam agreements in the proceedings of the Allied Control Council. In particular, it reserved the right to block any proposals to establish common policies and institutions across Germany as a whole and anything that could lead to the eventual emergence of a unified German government.

=== Austria ===
The Soviet Union proposed for the authority of Karl Renner's provisional government to be extended to all of Austria. The Allies agreed to examine the proposal after British and American forces entered Vienna.

=== Poland ===
Poland's old and new borders, 1945. The territory previously part of Germany is identified in pink.

- A Provisional Government of National Unity, created by the Soviets and known as the Lublin Poles, was to be recognized by all three powers. The Big Three's recognition of the Soviet-controlled government effectively meant the end of recognition of the London-based Polish government-in-exile.
- The British and the Americans governments took measures for the Polish Provisional Government to own property in the territories of Poland and to have all the legal rights to the property so that no other government could have it.
- Poles serving in the British Army would be free to return to Communist Poland but with no guarantee of their security upon their return.
- All Poles who returned to Poland would be accorded personal and property rights.
- The Polish Provisional Government agreed to hold, as soon as possible, free elections with widespread suffrage and secret ballots. Democratic and anti-Nazi parties would have the right to take part, and representatives of the Allied press would have full freedom to report on developments during the elections.
- The Soviet Union declared that it would settle the reparation claims of Poland from its own share of the overall reparation payments.
- The provisional western border would be the Oder–Neisse line, defined by the Oder and Neisse Rivers. Silesia, Pomerania, the southern part of East Prussia, and the former Free City of Danzig would be under Polish administration. However, the final delimitation of the western frontier of Poland would await the peace settlement, which would only take place 45 years later, in 1990, during the Treaty on the Final Settlement with Respect to Germany.

The Soviet Union proposed to the Conference for the territorial questions to be resolved permanently after peace was established in those regions. More specifically, the proposal referred to the section of the western Soviet border near the Baltic Sea. The area would pass from the eastern shore of the Bay of Danzig to the east, north of Braunsberg and Goldap, to the meeting point of the frontiers of Lithuania, the Polish Republic, and East Prussia.

After the conference considered the Soviet recommendation, it agreed for the city of Königsberg and the area next to it to be transferred to the Soviet Union.

Truman and Winston Churchill guaranteed that they would support the proposals of the conference when peace was eventually ensured.

=== Italy ===
The Soviet Union made a proposal to the conference concerning the mandated territories and conformed with what had been decided at the Yalta Conference and the Charter of the United Nations.

After various opinions on the question had been discussed, the foreign prime ministers agreed that it was essential to decide at once the preparation of a peace treaty for Italy, combined with the disposition of any former Italian territories. In September, the Council of Ministers of Foreign Affairs would examine the question of the Italian territory.

=== Orderly transfers of German populations ===
At the conference, the Allied leaders confirmed their previous commitment to the removal of German populations from Poland, Czechoslovakia, and Hungary, which the provisional governments of those countries had already begun to put into effect. The three allied leaders agreed that transfers of German civilians should proceed in an orderly and humane manner, but according to modern estimates, between 600,000 and 2.2 million Germans died during the flight and expulsions.

The leaders decided that the Allied Control Council in Germany would deal with the matter, giving priority to the equal distribution of Germans among the various zones of occupation. Representatives on the Control Council were to report to their governments and to each zonal administration the number of people who had already entered Germany from the eastern countries. The representatives would also form an estimate of the future pace of transfers and focus on the German occupied government's capacity to process new arrivals. The provisional governments of Poland, Hungary, and Czechoslovakia were instructed to temporarily suspend expulsions of German civilians until their respective Control Council representatives had reported these results and estimates.

=== Revised Allied Control Commission procedures in Romania, Bulgaria, and Hungary ===
The Big Three took notice that the Soviet representatives on the Allied Control Commissions in Romania, Bulgaria, and Hungary had communicated to their British and Americans colleagues proposals for refining the work of the Control Commission since the war in Europe had ended. The three leaders agreed on the revision of the procedures of the commissions in these countries and took into consideration the interests and responsibilities of their own governments, which together presented the terms of the armistice to the occupied countries.

=== Council of Foreign Ministers ===
The Conference agreed on the establishment of a Council of Foreign Ministers to represent the five principal powers, continue the essential preliminary work for the peace settlements, and assume other matters that could occasionally be committed to the council by agreement of the governments participating it. The establishment of the Council in question did not contradict the agreement of the Yalta Conference that there should be periodic meetings among the foreign secretaries of the three governments. According to the text of the agreement for the establishment of the council, this was decided:

1. A Council composed of the Foreign Ministers of the United Kingdom, the Union of the Soviet Socialist Republics, China, France and the United States should be established.
2. (I) The council should meet in London and form the Joint Secretariat. Each of the foreign ministers would be accompanied by a high-ranking deputy, properly authorized to continue the work of the Council in the absence of their foreign minister, and by a small staff of technical advisers. (II) The first meeting of the council should be held in London not later than 1 September 1945. Meetings could also be held by common agreement in other capitals.
3. (I) The council should be authorized to write, with a view to their submission to the United Nations, treaties of peace with Italy, Romania, Bulgaria, Hungary, and Finland, and to propose settlements of territorial issues pending the termination of the war in Europe. The council should also prepare a peace settlement for Germany to be accepted by the government of Germany when a government adequate for the purpose is established. (II) To accomplish the previous tasks, the council would be composed of the members representing those states which were signatories to the terms of surrender imposed upon the enemy state concerned.
4. (I) On any occasion the council would consider a question of direct interest to a state not represented, such state should be requested to send representatives to participate in the discussion of that question. (II) The council would be able to adapt its procedure to the particular problem under consideration. In some cases, it could hold its initial discussions before the participation of other interested states. Following the decision of the Conference, the Big Three have each addressed an invitation to the Governments of China and France, to adopt the text and to join in establishing the council.
5. (I) In accordance with the decision at the Potsdam Conference, the United States, Great Britain, and the Soviet Union agreed that the 1936 Montreux Convention should be revised. The United States subsequently proposed that the Straits be opened to all commercial vessels at all times, and to Black Sea warships at all times, while restricting non-Black Sea warships except with Black Sea powers' consent or under UN authority.

=== Concluding peace treaties and facilitating membership in United Nations ===
The Conference agreed to apply common policies for determining, at the earliest opportunity, the terms of the peace.

In general, the Big Three desired that dispositions of Italy, Bulgaria, Finland, Hungary, and Romania should be resolved by the end of the negotiations. They believed that the other Allies would share their point of view.

As the disposition of Italy was one of the most important issues that required the attention of the new Council of Foreign Ministers, the three governments were especially concerned with concluding a peace treaty with Italy, especially as it had been the first of the Axis powers to break with Germany and to participate in Allied operations against Japan.

Italy was making significant progress in gaining its freedom and rejecting the previous fascist regime, and it had paved the way for the re-establishment of democratic governments. If Italy had a recognized and democratic government, it would be easier for the Americans, the British, and the Soviets to support the membership of Italy in the United Nations.

The Council of Foreign Ministers also had to examine and prepare the peace treaties for Bulgaria, Finland, Hungary, and Romania. The conclusion of peace treaties with recognized and democratic governments in those four countries would allow the Big Three to accept their requests to be members of the United Nations. Moreover, after the termination of peace negotiations, the Big Three agreed to examine in the near future the restoration of the diplomatic relations with Finland, Romania, Bulgaria, and Hungary. The Big Three were sure that the situation in Europe after the end of World War II would allow representatives of the Allied press to enjoy freedom of expression in the four countries.

Article 4 of the Charter of the United Nations read:

1. Membership in the United Nations is open to all other peace-loving States who accept the obligations contained in the present Charter and, in the judgment of the organization, are able and willing to carry out these obligations;

2. The admission of any such state to membership in the United Nations will be effected by a decision of the General Assembly upon the recommendation of the Security Council.

The leaders declared that they were willing to support any request for membership from states that had remained neutral during the war and fulfilled the other requirements. The Big Three felt the need to clarify that they were reluctant to support application for such membership from the Spanish government, which had been established with the support of the Axis powers.

=== Potsdam Declaration ===
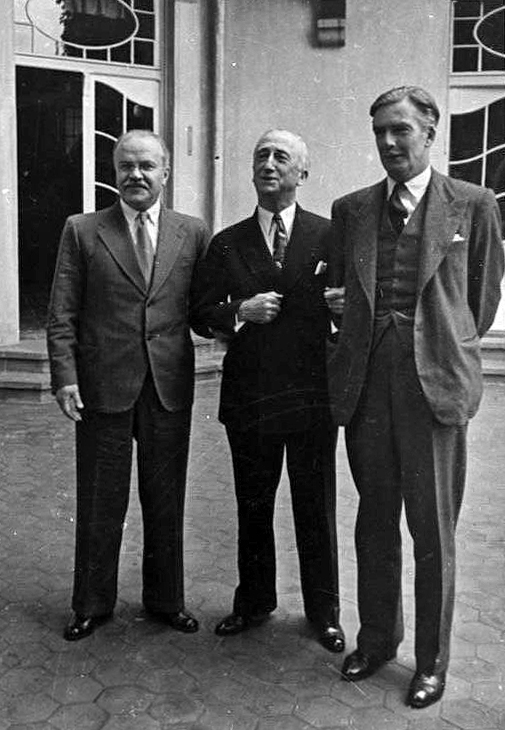
The Foreign Ministers: Vyacheslav Molotov, James F. Byrnes, and Anthony Eden, July 1945

In addition to the Potsdam Agreement, on 26 July, Churchill; Truman; and Chiang Kai-shek, Chairman of the Nationalist Government of China (the Soviet Union was not yet at war against Japan), issued the Potsdam Declaration, which outlined the terms of surrender for Japan during World War II in Asia.

== Aftermath ==
Truman had mentioned an unspecified "powerful new weapon" to Stalin during the conference. Towards the end of the conference, on 26 July, the Potsdam Declaration gave Japan an ultimatum to surrender unconditionally or meet "prompt and utter destruction", which did not mention the new bomb but promised that "it was not intended to enslave Japan". The Soviet Union was not involved in that declaration since it was still neutral in the war against Japan. Japanese Prime Minister Kantarō Suzuki sent negotiators but the United States did not respond, which was interpreted later as a sign that the Japanese had ignored the ultimatum. As a result, the United States dropped atomic bombs on Hiroshima on 6 August and on Nagasaki on 9 August 1945. The justifications used were that both cities were legitimate military targets and that it was necessary to end the war swiftly and preserve American lives.

When Truman informed Stalin of the atomic bomb, he said that the United States "had a new weapon of unusual destructive force", but Stalin had full knowledge of the atomic bomb's development from Soviet spy networks inside the Manhattan Project and told Truman at the conference that he hoped Truman "would make good use of it against the Japanese."

The Soviet Union converted several countries of Eastern Europe into communist satellite states within the Eastern Bloc, such as the People's Republic of Poland, the People's Republic of Bulgaria, the People's Republic of Hungary, the Czechoslovak Socialist Republic, the People's Republic of Romania, and the People's Republic of Albania. Many of those countries had seen failed Socialist revolutions prior to World War II.

Regarding the establishment of the Oder–Neisse line, President Truman reported that Stalin had presented the occupation of Eastern Poland by the Soviet Union and Polish annexation of Silesia and eastern Pomerania as a fait accompli. Taken by surprise, the Western Allies had been forced to abandon the principles of the Atlantic Charter.

== Previous major conferences ==
- Yalta Conference, 4 to 11 February 1945
- Second Quebec Conference, 12 to 16 September 1944
- Tehran Conference, 28 November to 1 December 1943
- Cairo Conference, 22 to 26 November 1943
- Casablanca Conference, 14 to 24 January 1943

== See also ==
- Diplomatic history of World War II
- Foreign policy of the Harry S. Truman administration
- List of Soviet Union–United States summits
- Origins of the Cold War

== Sources ==
- Beschloss, Michael. The Conquerors: Roosevelt, Truman, and the destruction of Hitler's Germany, 1941–1945 (Simon & Schuster, 2002) ISBN 0-6848-1027-1
- Cecil, Robert. "Potsdam and its Legends." International Affairs 46.3 (1970): 455–465. online
- Cook, Bernard A. (2001), Europe Since 1945: An Encyclopedia, Taylor & Francis, ISBN 0-8153-4057-5
- Costigliola, Frank. Roosevelt's Lost Alliances: How Personal Politics Helped Start the Cold War (2013): 359–417.
- Davis, Lynn Etheridge. The Cold War Begins: Soviet-American Conflict Over East Europe (2015) pp 288–334.
- Farquharson, J. E. "Anglo-American Policy on German Reparations from Yalta to Potsdam." English Historical Review 1997 112(448): 904–926. in JSTOR
- Feis, Herbert. Between War and Peace: The Potsdam Conference (Princeton University Press, 1960) OCLC 259319 Pulitzer Prize; online
- Fenby, Jonathan. Alliance: the inside story of how Roosevelt, Stalin and Churchill won one war and began another (Simon and Schuster, 2015). pp 401–420.
- Gimbel, John. "On the Implementation of the Potsdam Agreement: an Essay on U.S. Postwar German Policy." Political Science Quarterly 1972 87(2): 242–269. in JSTOR
- Gormly, James L. From Potsdam to the Cold War: Big Three Diplomacy, 1945–1947. (Scholarly Resources, 1990)
- Grenville, John Ashley Soames (2005), A History of the World from the 20th to the 21st Century, Routledge, ISBN 0-4152-8954-8
- Lewkowicz, Nicolas, The German Question and the International Order, 1943–1948. Palgrave, 2010. ISBN 978-1-3493-2035-6
- Mee, Charles L. Jr. Meeting at Potsdam. M. Evans & Company, 1975. ISBN 0-8713-1167-4
- Miscamble, Wilson D. (2007), From Roosevelt to Truman: Potsdam, Hiroshima, and the Cold War, Cambridge University Press, ISBN 978-0-5218-6244-8
- Naimark, Norman. Fires of Hatred. Ethnic Cleansing in Twentieth-Century Europe (Harvard University Press, 2001) ISBN 0-6740-0313-6
- Neiberg, Michael. Potsdam: the End of World War II and the Remaking of Europe (Basic Books, 2015) ISBN 978-0-4650-7525-6 excerpt
- Thackrah, J. R. "Aspects of American and British Policy Towards Poland from the Yalta to the Potsdam Conferences, 1945." Polish Review 1976 21(4): 3–34. in JSTOR
- Villa, Brian L. "The US Army, unconditional surrender, and the Potsdam Proclamation." Journal of American History 63.1 (1976): 66–92. online
- Wolk, Herman S. Cataclysm: General Hap Arnold and the Defeat of Japan (2012) pp 163–206; the top Air Force general was a Truman advisor.
- Woodward, Sir Llewellyn. British foreign policy in the second world war (HM Stationery Office, 1962) pp 536–575; the summary volume of his multivolume history.
- Zayas, Alfred M. de. Nemesis at Potsdam: The Anglo-Americans and the Expulsion of the Germans, Background, Execution, Consequences. Routledge, 1977. ISBN 0-7100-0458-3

=== Primary sources ===
- Bevans, Charles Irving (1968). Treaties and Other International Agreements of the United States of America, 1776–1949: Multilateral, 1931–1945. Department of State.
- Foreign Relations of the United States: Diplomatic Papers. The Conference of Berlin (Potsdam Conference, 1945) 2 vols. Washington, D.C.: U.S. Government Printing Office, 1960 online
- The Tehran, Yalta & Potsdam Conferences. Documents. Moscow: Progress Publishers. 1969.
- Harriman, W. Averell, and Elie Abel, Special Envoy to Churchill and Stalin, 1941–1946 (1975)
- Leahy, Fleet Adm William D. I Was There: The Personal Story of the Chief of Staff to Presidents Roosevelt and Truman: Based on His Notes and Diaries Made at the Time (1950) OCLC 314294296.
- Mark, Eduard. "'Today Has Been A Historical One': Harry S Truman's Diary of the Potsdam Conference." Diplomatic History 4.3 (1980): 317–326. online
- Paterson, Thomas G. "Potsdam, the Atomic Bomb, and the Cold War: A Discussion with James F. Byrnes." Pacific Historical Review 41.2 (1972): 225–230. online
- United States Department of State Foreign relations of the United States : diplomatic papers : the Conference of Berlin (The Potsdam Conference) 1945 Volume I Washington, D.C.: U.S. Government Printing Office
- United States Department of State Foreign relations of the United States : diplomatic papers : the Conference of Berlin (The Potsdam Conference) 1945 Volume II Washington, D.C.: U.S. Government Printing Office
- European Advisory Commission, Austria, Germany Foreign relations of the United States: diplomatic papers, 1945.
