= Alice Josephine Tye Noel =

First Lady of Mississippi
- In office January 21, 1908 – January 16, 1912
- Governor: Edmund Favor Noel
- Preceded by: Anna Burleson Robinson Vardaman
- Succeeded by: Minnie Marion Block Brewer

Personal details
- Born: Alice Josephine Tye; June 25, 1868 Yazoo, Mississippi, U.S.
- Died: June 24, 1933 (aged 64) Lexington, Mississippi, U.S.
- Resting place: Odd Fellows Cemetery, Lexington, Mississippi, U.S.
- Party: Democratic
- Spouse(s): Halbert Hale Neilson, Sr. (m 1891-1898); Edmund Favor Noel (1905-1927)
- Children: 2 sons with Neilson
- Relatives: Abraham Clark

Alice Josephine Tye Noel (June 25, 1868 – June 24, 1933) was an American suffragist, civic leader, and the wife of Edmund Favor Noel, the 35th Governor of Mississippi. Known for her advocacy of women's rights, particularly her involvement in the women's suffrage movement in the early 20th century, Noel played a key role in organizing significant events such as the 1908 Mississippi Women’s Suffrage Association meeting at the Governor's Mansion and the 1912 Women’s Day at the Mississippi State Fair. A dedicated member of the Daughters of the American Revolution (DAR), she served in various leadership roles, including state regent. In addition to her suffrage work, Noel was influential in preserving the Governor’s mansion and advocating for the creation of a memorial to Mississippi’s World War I soldiers.

== Early life and marriages ==
Alice Josephine Tye was born on June 25, 1868, in Yazoo, Mississippi, the daughter of Colonel John Fletcher Tye, a merchant and Confederate States Army veteran, and Ellen Josephine Clark, a descendant of Abraham Clark, a signer of the United States Declaration of Independence. Alice had two brothers, Hiram and John, and was educated at Ward's Seminary, graduating with high honors in 1886.

In 1891, Alice married Halbert Hale Neilson, Sr., and they had two sons, Albert and Edwin Tye. Halbert Neilson died in 1898, shortly before the birth of their second son. Alice remarried in 1905 to Edmund Favor Noel, a former state legislator and later governor of Mississippi.

== Suffrage movement ==
Alice Noel became a key figure in Mississippi's suffrage movement. She was actively involved in various women's organizations, including the Daughters of the American Revolution (DAR) and the United Daughters of the Confederacy. In 1908, the Noels hosted a major annual meeting of the Mississippi Women's Suffrage Association at the Governor’s mansion, where the group declared its allegiance to the principles of the Declaration of Independence, advocating for women’s rights to vote.

Noel was also instrumental in the 1912 Women’s Day at the Mississippi State Fair, where she delivered a speech in which she addressed the misconception that women in Mississippi were not interested in voting. The event, which involved multiple women’s groups including the Women's Suffrage Association, was heralded as one of the largest and most representative gatherings of women in the state's history.

== Other activism ==
In addition to her suffrage activities, Noel was an active member of the DAR, holding several leadership positions, including state regent in 1918. She was also involved in the state’s efforts to honor its soldiers, advocating for the creation of a memorial for Mississippi's soldiers and sailors who served in World War I.

== Final years and death ==
Her commitment to public service continued even after the death of her second husband E.F. Noel in 1927. Alice Noel died on June 24, 1933, in Lexington, Mississippi, and was buried beside him in Odd Fellows Cemetery.
