= Pat Harrison =

American politician (1881–1941)

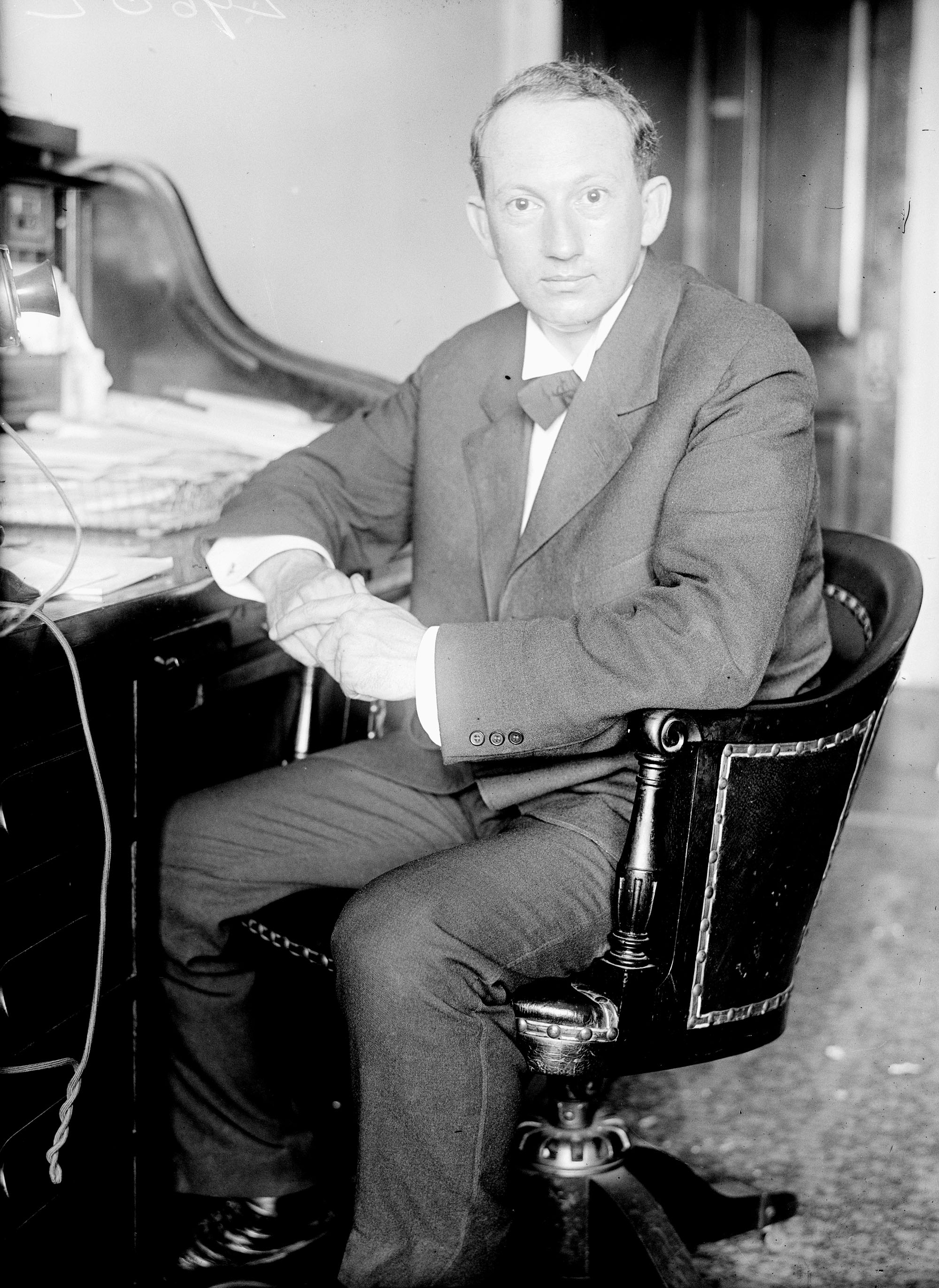

President pro tempore of the United States Senate
- In office January 6, 1941 – June 22, 1941
- Preceded by: William H. King
- Succeeded by: Carter Glass

United States Senator from Mississippi
- In office March 4, 1919 – June 22, 1941
- Preceded by: James K. Vardaman
- Succeeded by: James Eastland
Committee chairmanships
Chair of the Senate Finance Committee
In office March 4, 1933 – June 22, 1941
Preceded by	Reed Smoot
Succeeded by	Walter George

Member of the U.S. House of Representatives from Mississippi's 6th district
- In office March 4, 1911 – March 4, 1919
- Preceded by: Eaton J. Bowers
- Succeeded by: Paul B. Johnson Sr.

Personal details
- Born: Byron Patton Harrison; August 29, 1881 Crystal Springs, Mississippi, U.S.
- Died: June 22, 1941 (aged 59) Washington, D.C., U.S.
- Party: Democratic
- Education: Louisiana State University, Baton Rouge

Byron Patton "Pat" Harrison (August 29, 1881 – June 22, 1941) was a Mississippi politician who served as a Democrat in the United States House of Representatives from 1911 to 1919 and in the United States Senate from 1919 until his death.

== Early life and education ==
Pat Harrison was born at Crystal Springs, Mississippi. His father was a Confederate veteran of the Civil War and died in 1885. As a child, Harrison sold newspapers to supplement his family's income. After graduating as class valedictorian from Crystal Springs High School in 1899, he attended a summer term at the University of Mississippi before transferring to Louisiana State University at Baton Rouge on a baseball scholarship.

He dropped out after two years due to a lack of funds but was brought on to pitch for the Pickens, Mississippi, semi-professional baseball team in the 'Old Tomato League' summer circuit. After his stint in semi-professional baseball, Harrison moved to Leakesville, Mississippi. He taught and later became principal of the local high school. While supporting himself as an educator, Harrison studied law. He passed the Mississippi State Bar and opened a law practice in 1902.

== Legal and political career ==
In 1906, Harrison was elected district attorney to the Second Judicial District, and in 1908, moved to Gulfport, Mississippi. He served as district attorney until being elected to the U.S. House of Representatives in 1910. The 1910 election introduced Harrison as a skilled orator and witty debater, a reputation he maintained throughout his political career. Newspaper editor Clayton Rand described his longtime friend's oratory style as "an eloquence that flowed like a babbling brook through a field of flowers."

=== Political career ===
After four years as district attorney on the Mississippi Gulf Coast, Harrison won a seat in the U.S. House of Representatives in 1911 and was re-elected three times. One of the youngest members of the House, Harrison made his mark as an effective debater against Republican tariff and tax policies and soon became a favored aide to Democratic President Woodrow Wilson. In particular, Harrison supported Wilson's New Freedom policies and those concerning Mexico and Germany at the onset of America's involvement in World War I. In 1918, he ran against incumbent U.S. Senator James K. Vardaman, an enemy of President Wilson. In return for Harrison's past support, President Wilson personally endorsed him for Senator. Already popular among his constituents, Harrison emphasized his differences with Vardaman and won over a majority of Mississippi voters, who were effectively limited to white Democrats, following the state legislature's disenfranchisement of most black voters by a new constitution and discriminatory practices dating from 1890. After winning Vardaman's Senate seat in 1918, Harrison was re-elected for another three terms, as Mississippi was a one-party state dominated by Democrats. He ran unopposed in 1930 for his third term in the U.S. Senate.

A supporter and former law partner of Theodore G. Bilbo, Stewart C. "Sweep Clean" Broom surprisingly aided Harrison's 1936 reelection campaign by giving a well-received speech encouraging "Bilbo folks" to save Bilbo "from his own blunder." Despite having received past help from Harrison, Bilbo actively supported Martin Sennett Conner for Harrison's Senate seat, presumably as a self-serving political maneuver.

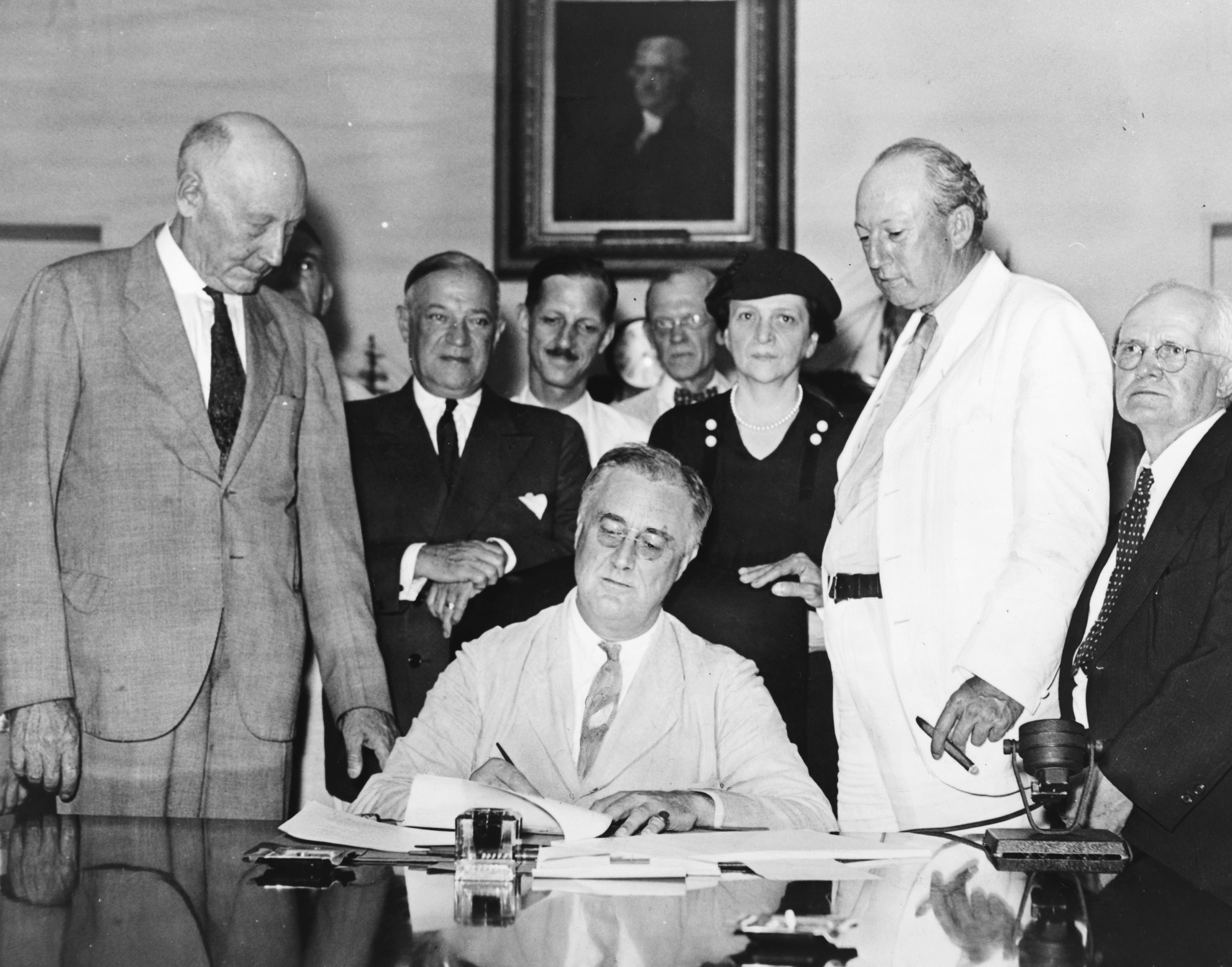
President Roosevelt signs the Social Security Act into law, August 14, 1935. (Harrison second from right)

As chairman of the powerful Senate Finance Committee, Harrison was one of the three or four key people behind the creation of the Social Security system in 1935. He also promoted low tariffs and reciprocal trade agreements. When the Senate majority leader's job opened up in 1937, Harrison was expected to win the position, but nose counts put him in a near tie with Kentucky's Alben Barkley. Harrison's campaign manager asked Bilbo, the junior member from Mississippi, to consider voting for his fellow Mississippian. Bilbo, a race-baiting Democratic demagogue whose base was among tenant farmers, hated the upper-class Harrison, who represented the rich planters. The rivalry between the two had deepened over years of disagreement over aspects of the New Deal and how federal money should be distributed throughout Mississippi. Bilbo said he would vote for Harrison only if he were personally asked. Harrison replied, "Tell the son of a bitch I wouldn't speak to him even if it meant the presidency of the United States." Despite Harrison's support for Roosevelt and his policies, shortly before the vote, the president wrote a letter of support for Barkley. When the ballots were in, Harrison lost by one vote, 37–38.

Like other Southern Senators, he opposed federal action on civil rights, becoming the first senator to use the Senate Journal as a means to filibuster during the 1922 debate on the Dyer Anti-Lynching Bill. The Senate rules state that "the reading of the Journal shall not be suspended unless by unanimous consent", so Harrison's discussion of the Senate Journal was unable to be clotured until the sponsors withdrew the Bill.

Harrison served on the Senate Finance Committee and was chairman of that body from 1933 to 1941 (Seventy-third through Seventy-seventh Congresses), and served as President pro tempore of the Senate during the Seventy-seventh Congress, in 1941 until his death that year.

=== Political reputation ===
Harrison was a highly effective politician and a brilliant orator. He listened to his district and provided information, services, and patronage. Due to his ability to maneuver through the political landscape and because he was well-liked by many of his fellow politicians, Harrison became rather influential in both legislation and political endorsement. In 1928, he supported New York Governor Al Smith for President and campaigned for him across the South, where there was opposition and superstition among white Southerners because of Smith’s Catholicism.

Harrison became known as the "Gadfly of the Senate" due to his oratory rebuking Republican policies.

At the 1932 Democratic National Convention, he swung the Mississippi delegation to Franklin D. Roosevelt on the crucial third ballot and became welcome at the White House.

Senator Tom Connally, who supported Harrison's unsuccessful bid to become Senate majority leader, described him in his autobiography as such:

Pat was especially well liked by the general membership of the Senate, and because of his position as chairman of the powerful Finance Committee, where so much of the recovery program was channeled, he was known as an effective and liberal senator. He had played a large role in passing the NRA, the Social Security Act and the Roosevelt tax program. In addition, on the Senate floor, Pat was a splendid debater.

== Death ==
On 16 June 1941, Harrison underwent surgery for an intestinal obstruction. He died from post-operative complications six days later.

== Bibliography ==
- Coker, William S. "Pat Harrison – Strategy for Victory". Journal of Mississippi History 1966 28(4): 267–285.
- Coker, William Sidney. "Pat Harrison: the Formative Years." Journal of Mississippi History 1963 25(4): 251–278.
- Davis, Polly. "Court Reform and Alben W. Barkley's Election as Majority Leader". Southern Quarterly 1976 15(1): 15-31.
- Edmonson, Ben G. "Pat Harrison and Mississippi in the Presidential Elections of 1924 and 1928". Journal of Mississippi History 1971 33(4): 333–350.
- Grant, Philip A., Jr. "Editorial Reaction to the Harrison-Barkley Senate Leadership Contest, 1937". Journal of Mississippi History 1974 36(2): 127–141.
- Grant, Philip A., Jr. "The Mississippi Congressional Delegation and the Formation of the Conservative Coalition, 1937–1940". Journal of Mississippi History 1988 50(1): 21–28.
- Finley, Keith M. Delaying the Dream: Southern Senators and the Fight Against Civil Rights, 1938–1965 (Baton Rouge, LSU Press, 2008).
- Lord, Lewis. U.S. News & World Report, June 17, 1996, p. 12.
- Swain, Martha H. Pat Harrison: The New Deal Years (Jackson, Miss., 1978), the standard biography
- Swain, Martha. "Pat Harrison and the Social Security Act of 1935". Southern Quarterly 1976 15(1): 1–14.
- Swain, Martha H. "The Lion and the Fox: the Relationship of President Franklin D. Roosevelt and Senator Pat Harrison". Journal of Mississippi History 1976 38(4): 333–359.
- Thomas, Phyllis H. "The Role of Mississippi in the Presidential Election of 1916," Southern Quarterly, 1966 4(2): 207–226.

== See also ==
- List of members of the United States Congress who died in office (1900–1949)

U.S. House of Representatives
Preceded by Eaton J. Bowers	Member of the U.S. House of Representatives from Mississippi's 6th congressional district 1911–1919	Succeeded by Paul B. Johnson Sr.
Party political offices
First	Democratic nominee for U.S. Senator from Mississippi (Class 2); 1918, 1924, 1930, 1936	Succeeded by Wall Doxey
Preceded by Homer Cummings	Keynote Speaker of the Democratic National Convention; 1924	Succeeded by Claude Bowers
U.S. Senate
Preceded by James K. Vardaman	U.S. Senator (Class 2) from Mississippi; 1919–1941; Served alongside: John Sharp Williams, Hubert D. Stephens, Theodore Bilbo	Succeeded by James Eastland
Preceded by Reed Smoot	Chair of the Senate Finance Committee; 1933–1941	Succeeded by Walter F. George
Political offices
Preceded by William H. King	President pro tempore of the U.S. Senate; 1941	Succeeded by Carter Glass
