= James K. Vardaman Jr. =

American lawyer and political advisor (1894–1972)

Jake Vardaman
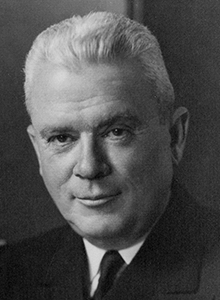

Member of the Federal Reserve Board of Governors
- In office April 4, 1946 – November 30, 1958
- President: Harry S. Truman; Dwight D. Eisenhower
- Preceded by: John McKee
- Succeeded by: George King

Personal details
- Born: James Kimble Vardaman Jr. August 28, 1894; Greenwood, Mississippi, U.S.
- Died: July 28, 1972 (aged 77)
- Political party: Democratic
- Relatives: James K. Vardaman (Father)
- Education: United States Naval Academy; University of Mississippi, Oxford; Millsaps College (LLB)

James Kimble Vardaman Jr. (1894–1972) was an American lawyer who served as a member of the Federal Reserve Board of Governors from 1946 to 1958 . He was a US Navy captain during World War II, and political aide to President Harry S. Truman. Before the war, he had worked as bank counselor in Missouri.

== Early life ==
James Kimble Vardaman Jr. was born in 1894 in Greenwood, Mississippi. His father, James K. Vardaman, was later Governor of Mississippi and a United States Senator.

Vardaman attended the United States Naval Academy in Annapolis, Maryland and the University of Mississippi in Oxford, Mississippi. He earned a law degree from Millsaps College in Jackson, Mississippi in 1914. He served in the United States Army from 1917 to 1919 during World War I, retiring as a Captain.

== Career ==
In the early 1920s, Vardaman worked as a lawyer to banks in Missouri. He worked for the Liberty-Central Trust Company in 1926. He later worked for the Tower Grove National Bank and Trust in Saint Louis.

During World War II, he joined the United States Navy and served in Algeria. By the end of the war in 1945, he was assigned as a naval aide to President Harry S. Truman.

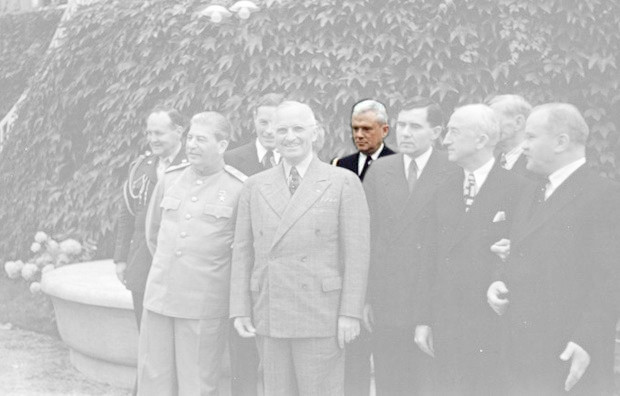
Vardaman in second row at Potsdam Conference

In that role, Vardaman attended the Potsdam Conference from July to August 1945. He continued to assist Truman after the war.

Vardaman chose Clark Clifford as his assistant, who would soon bypass him and be appointed as Truman's special counsel in 1946. According to Truman's daughter Margaret Truman, the President thought that Vardaman had an "acute case of Potomac fever," which did not align with his own feelings.

Vardaman gained an appointment as a Governor of the Federal Reserve, serving from 1946 to 1958. During his tenure, he was "a proponent of price and wage controls." Shortly after, he worked in the financial sector in Albany, Georgia.

== Honors ==
For his World War II service in the Navy, Vardaman received the Legion of Merit and the Silver Star.

== Death ==
He died in 1972.

Government offices
Preceded by John McKee	Member of the Federal Reserve Board of Governors; 1946–1958	Succeeded by George King
