= James K. Vardaman =

American politician (1861–1930)

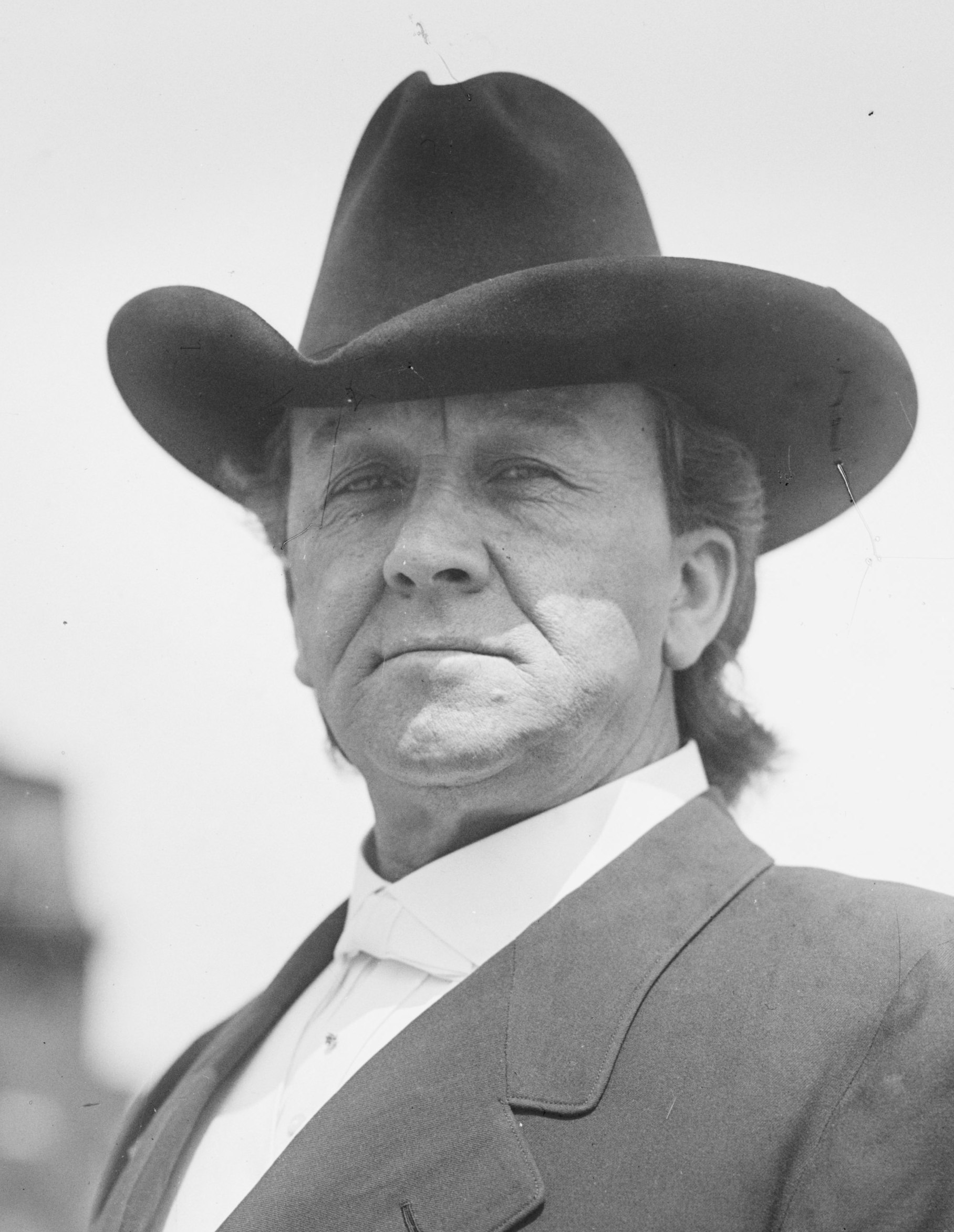
- Vardaman in 1910

United States Senator from Mississippi
- In office March 4, 1913 – March 3, 1919
- Preceded by: LeRoy Percy
- Succeeded by: Byron P. Harrison

36th Governor of Mississippi
- In office January 19, 1904 – January 21, 1908
- Lieutenant: John Prentiss Carter
- Preceded by: Andrew H. Longino
- Succeeded by: Edmond Favor Noel

Speaker of the Mississippi House of Representatives
- In office 1894–1896
- Preceded by: Hugh McQueen Street
- Succeeded by: James F. McCool

Member of the Mississippi House of Representatives from the Leflore County district
- In office January 1890 – January 1896

Personal details
- Born: James Kimble Vardaman; July 26, 1861 Jackson County, Texas, C.S.
- Died: June 25, 1930 (aged 68) Birmingham, Alabama, U.S.
- Resting place: Lakewood Memorial Park, Jackson, Mississippi, U.S.
- Party: Democratic
- Spouse: Anna Burleson Robinson
- Nickname: "The Great White Chief"

Military service
- Allegiance: United States of America
- Branch/service: United States Army
- Rank: Major
- Battles/wars: Spanish–American War

James Kimble Vardaman (July 26, 1861 – June 25, 1930) was an American politician from the U.S. state of Mississippi. A Democrat, he served as the Governor of Mississippi from 1904 to 1908 and then represented Mississippi in the United States Senate from 1913 to 1919.

Known as "The Great White Chief", Vardaman had gained electoral support for his advocacy of populism and white supremacy, saying: "If it is necessary every Negro in the state will be lynched; it will be done to maintain white supremacy." Aligning with economically left-wing populists and favoring progressive reforms in railing against banks, railroads, and tariffs, he appealed to the poorer whites, yeomen farmers, and factory workers.

Vardaman's tenure as Governor of Mississippi was marked by his advocacy of regulating corporations, enacting child labor laws, segregating streetcars, ending educational opportunities for African Americans, and defending lynching. After finishing his term, he defeated Democratic incumbent LeRoy Percy, a member of the planter elite, in the primary for the 1912 U.S. Senate election, and was then elected unopposed in the general election.

== Early life, education, and early career ==
Vardaman was born in July 1861 in Jackson County, Texas, while it was under the control of the Confederate States of America, a fact he often remembered. He moved to Mississippi, where he studied law and passed the bar. Hernando Money was a cousin and political ally.

Vardaman settled in Greenwood, Mississippi, becoming editor of The Greenwood Commonwealth. Vardaman was commissioned as a major in the U.S. Army during the Spanish–American War (1898) and served in Puerto Rico after the U.S. took possession of that island.

== Political career ==
=== Early political career ===
As a Democrat, Vardaman served in the Mississippi House of Representatives from 1890 to 1896 and was elected as its speaker in 1894. He was known for his appeal to rural white men.

After having gained control of the legislature by suppressing the black vote, Mississippi Democrats passed a new constitution in 1890 with provisions, such as a poll tax and literacy test, that raised barriers to voter registration and disenfranchised most blacks.

Referring to the 1890 Mississippi state constitution, Vardaman said:

There is no use to equivocate or lie about the matter.... Mississippi's constitutional convention of 1890 was held for no other purpose than to eliminate the nigger from politics. Not the 'ignorant and vicious', as some of the apologists would have you believe, but the nigger.... Let the world know it just as it is.... In Mississippi we have in our constitution legislated against the racial peculiarities of the Negro.... When that device fails, we will resort to something else.

=== Governor of Mississippi ===
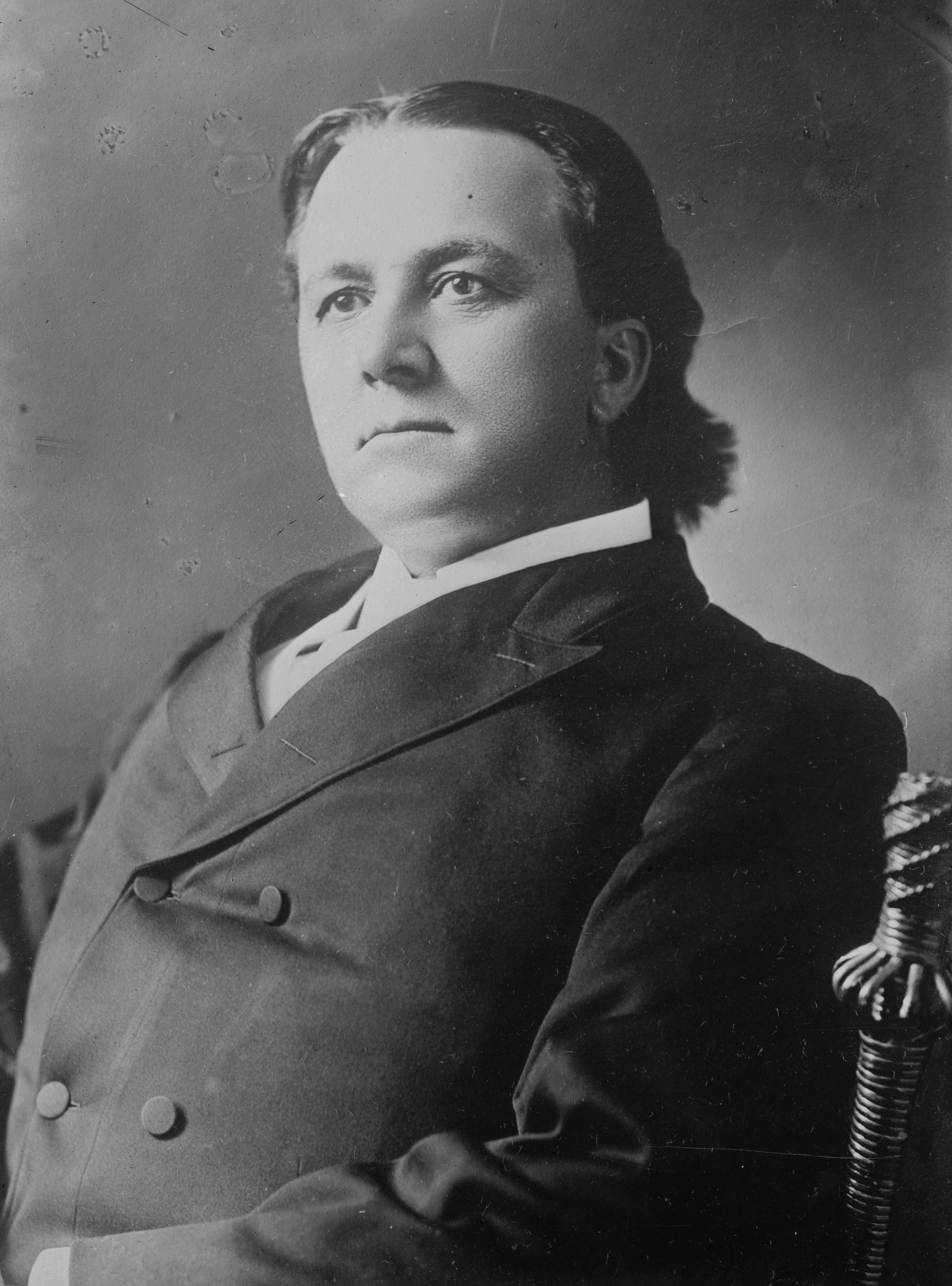
Vardaman c. 1900s

Vardaman ran twice in Democratic primaries for governor, in 1895 and 1899, but was unsuccessful. The state was virtually one-party, and winning the Democratic primary was tantamount to victory in the general election for any office.

In 1903 Vardaman won the primary and the general elections for governor, serving one four-year term (1904–1908). In the election, he said that "a vote for Vardaman is a vote for white supremacy, a vote for the quelling of the arrogant spirit that has been aroused in the blacks by Roosevelt and his henchmen, ...a vote for the safety of the home and the protection of our women and children."

In late December 1906, he went to Scooba, in rural Kemper County, with the Mississippi National Guard, to ensure that civil control was reestablished. Whites had rioted against blacks there and in Wahalak and feared retaliation; in total, two white men were killed and 13 blacks. The events were covered by the Associated Press and the New York Times, among other newspapers. During his term as governor, he called out the National Guard eleven times to prevent lynchings.

By 1910, his political coalition of chiefly poor white farmers and industrial workers began to identify proudly as "rednecks." They began to wear red neckerchiefs to political rallies and picnics. Vardaman advocated a policy of state-sponsored racism against blacks and said that he supported lynching to maintain white supremacy.

From 1877 to 1950, Mississippi had the highest number of lynchings in the nation. He was known as the "Great White Chief." Several reforms were also carried out during his time as governor.

=== U.S. Senate ===
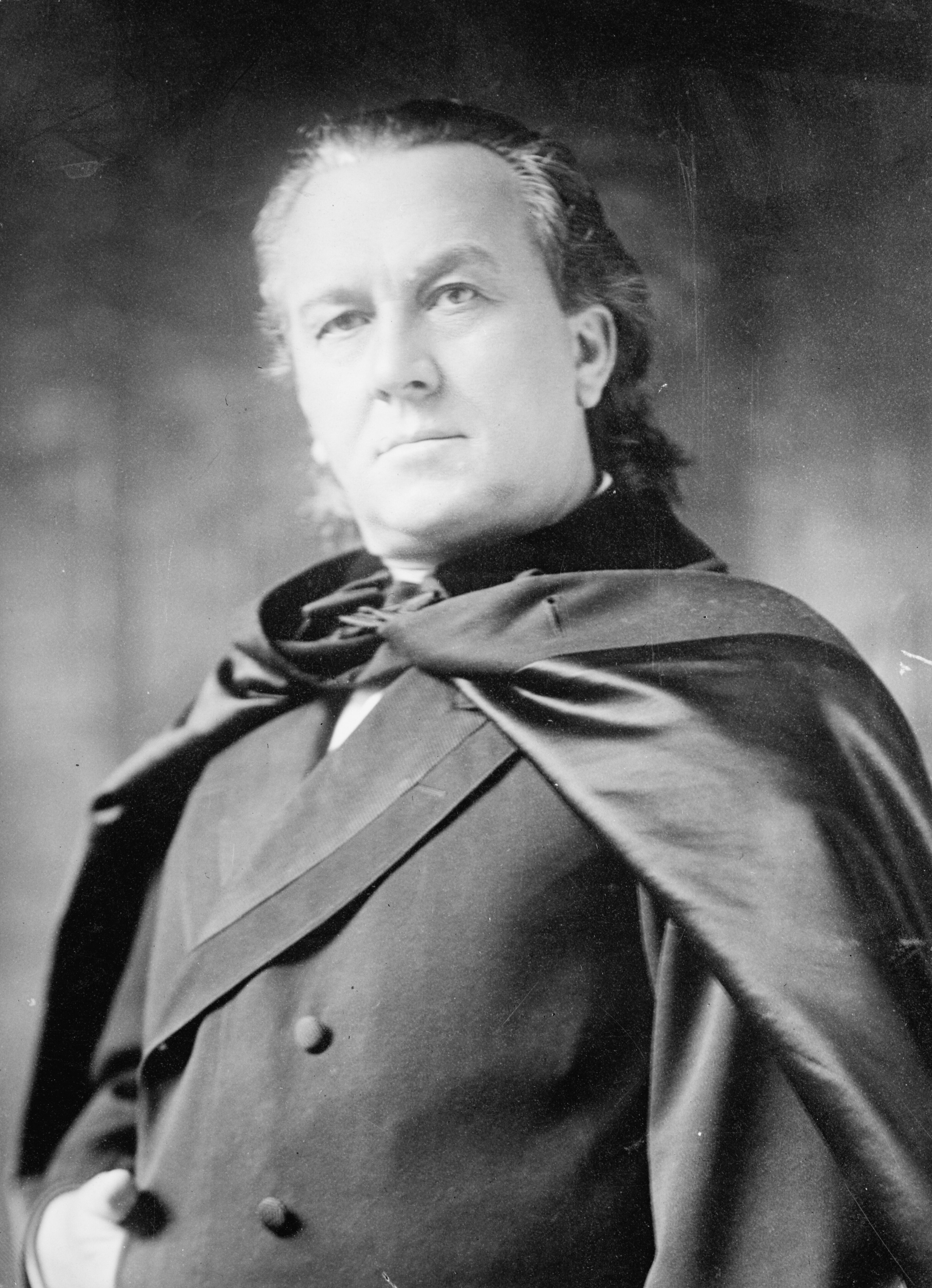
Vardaman as a U.S. Senator

Vardaman was elected to the U.S. Senate in 1912 in the first popular election of the state's senators, defeating the incumbent, LeRoy Percy, a member of the planter elite, in the Democratic primary. He ran on a platform of repealing the Fourteenth and Fifteenth Amendment, which gave blacks the vote and other rights. He was unopposed in the general election.

Vardaman served one term, from 1913 until 1919. He voted against the U.S. declaration of war on Germany and the entry into World War I, one of only six senators to do so. While serving as senator in Congress, Vardaman supported at the national level many reforms he advocated in Mississippi including higher tax surcharges on high incomes, government ownership of coal mines, shipping companies, telephone lines and railroads, and also long-term credit for farmers. In addition, he advocated guaranteed government pensions for the elderly.

Vardaman was defeated in his primary re-election bid in 1918. He ran in the Democratic primary for the U.S. Senate in 1922 but was defeated in the primary runoff by U.S. Representative Hubert Stephens by 9,000 votes.

=== Rhetoric ===
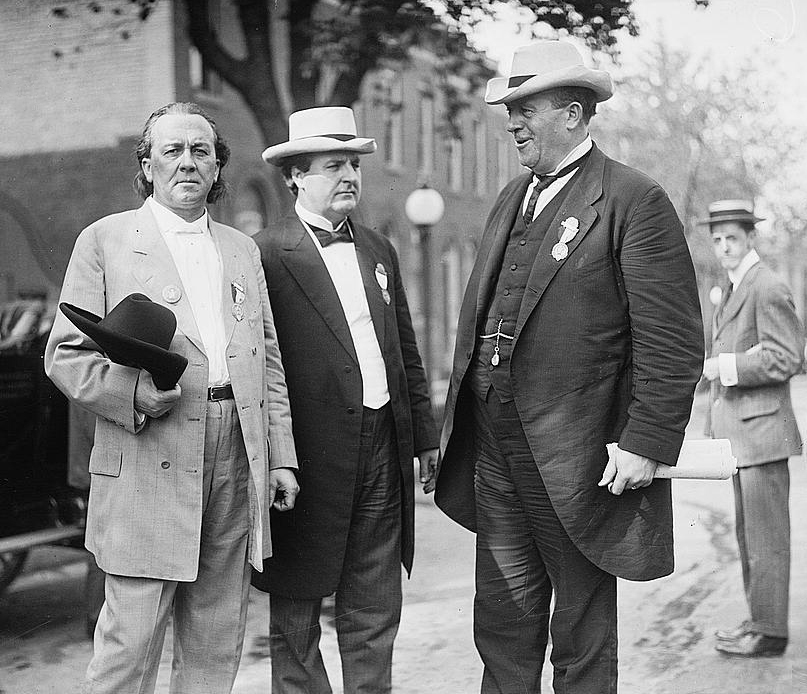
Vardaman with James Thomas Heflin and Ollie Murray James in 1912.

Vardaman was known for his provocative speeches and quotes even by the standards of his time and once called Theodore Roosevelt a "little, mean, coon-flavored miscegenationist." About the education of black children, he remarked, "The only effect of Negro education is to spoil a good field hand and make an insolent cook." "The knowledge of books does not seem to produce any good substantial result with the Negro, but serves to sharpen his cunning, breeds hopes that cannot be fulfilled, creates an inclination to avoid labor, promotes indolence, and in turn leads to crime."

After the president of Tuskegee University, Booker T. Washington, had dined with Roosevelt, Vardaman said that the White House was "so saturated with the odor of the nigger that the rats have taken refuge in the stable." Regarding Washington's role in politics, Vardaman said: "I am opposed to the nigger's voting, it matters not what his advertised moral and mental qualifications may be. I am just as much opposed to Booker Washington, with all his Anglo-Saxon reenforcement, voting, as I am to voting by the coconut-headed, chocolate-colored typical little coon, Andy Dotson, who blacks my shoes every morning. Neither one is fit to perform the supreme functions of citizenship."

== Personal life, death, and legacy ==
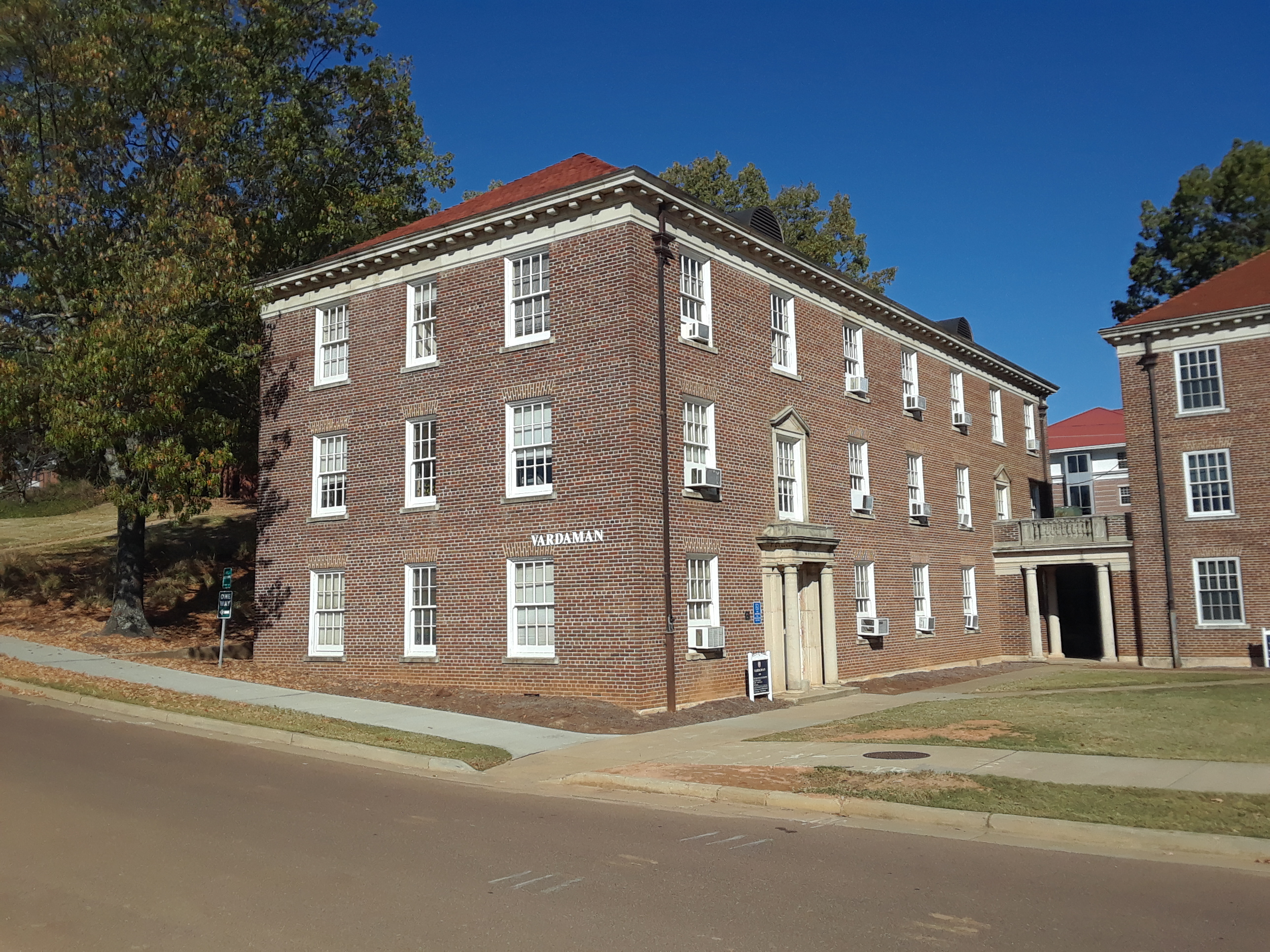
Vardaman Hall at the University of Mississippi

Vardaman married Anna Burleson Robinson. Their son, James K. Vardaman, Jr., later was appointed as a governor of the Federal Reserve System, serving from 1946 to 1958. Vardaman died on June 25, 1930, at the age of 68, at Birmingham Hospital in Birmingham, Alabama.

The town of Vardaman, Mississippi is named after him. There is also a Vardaman Hall at the University of Mississippi, which has borne his name since it was built in 1929. In July 2017, the University of Mississippi announced that Vardaman's name would be removed from the building, but it still has not been removed as of February 2026.

== In popular culture ==
In William Faulkner's novel As I Lay Dying, a character in the Bundren family is named after the governor, presumably because the Bundrens are a family of poor, rural whites, one of Vardaman's key constituencies as governor. In another of Faulkner's novels, Flags in the Dust, Governor Vardaman is mentioned twice; with both characters who mention him expressing admiration for his moral views and politics.

Party political offices
| Preceded by Andrew H. Longino | Democratic nominee for Governor of Mississippi; 1903 | Succeeded by Edmond Noel |
Political offices
| Preceded by Andrew H. Longino | Governor of Mississippi; 1904–1908 | Succeeded by Edmond Noel |
U.S. Senate
| Preceded by Le Roy Percy | U.S. senator (Class 2) from Mississippi; 1913–1919; Served alongside: John Sharp Williams | Succeeded by Pat Harrison |
