= John Prentiss Carter =

American politician (1840–1925)

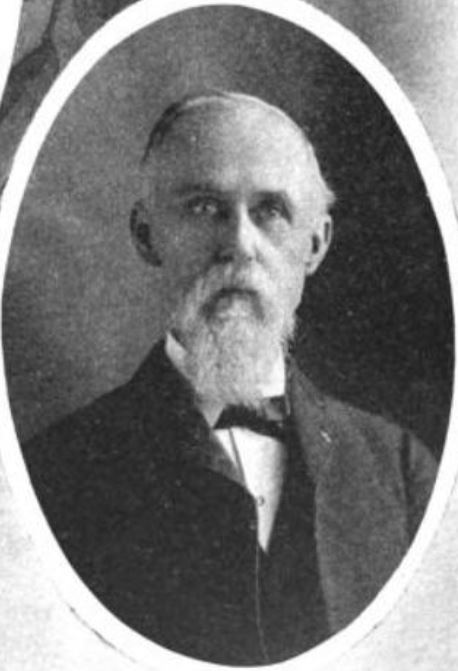
- c. 1904

Lieutenant Governor of Mississippi
- In office January 18, 1904 – January 20, 1908

Member of the Mississippi State Senate from the 1st district
- In office January 1874 – January 1882

Member of the Mississippi House of Representatives from the Perry County district
- In office January 1888 – January 1890
- In office 1865–1867

Personal details
- Born: February 7, 1840 Perry County, Mississippi, U.S.
- Died: July 24, 1925 (aged 85) Hattiesburg, Mississippi, U.S.
- Party: Democratic
- Profession: Lawyer

John Prentiss Carter (February 7, 1840 - July 24, 1925) was an American politician. He served in both houses of the Mississippi Legislature and was the Lieutenant Governor of Mississippi from 1904 to 1908.

== Early life ==
John Prentiss Carter was born February 7, 1840, near Augusta, Perry County, Mississippi. He was the son of Abner Carter, who had served in the Mississippi House of Representatives, and his wife, Isabella (McLeod) Carter. His maternal grandfather, John McLeod, was a member of the first Mississippi Constitutional Convention in 1817. Abner died in 1847. Carter attended the Salem high school, which was located in Greene County, Mississippi, from 1849 to 1857. In 1857, Carter enrolled in Centenary College as a sophomore, and graduated with second honors in 1860, receiving a Bachelor of Arts degree.

== Civil War ==
In 1861, after the American Civil War began, Carter enlisted in the Confederate Army as a private in Company G of Mississippi's 27th Infantry. He was soon afterwards promoted to the rank of sergeant major. In 1862, he was promoted to the rank of second lieutenant, and became a first lieutenant in 1863. In the war, Carter fought in the battles of Stones River, Chickamauga, and Lookout Mountain. During the battle of Lookout Mountain, Carter was captured and imprisoned in Johnson's Island until the end of the war.

== Career ==
After the war ended, Carter returned to Mississippi, where he read law and was admitted to the bar in 1866 or 1867. He practiced law in Hattiesburg until 1896. In 1865, Carter was Perry County's delegate to the Mississippi State Constitutional Convention. Carter was also elected to represent Perry County as a Democrat in the Mississippi House of Representatives for the 1865-1867 sessions. From 1867 to 1869, Carter served as Perry County's County Attorney. In 1873, Carter was elected to represent the First District in the Mississippi State Senate for a four-year term, and served in the sessions of 1874, 1875, 1876, and 1877. He was re-elected to the Senate in 1877, and served in the 1878 and 1880 sessions. Carter refused to run for re-election in 1881. In 1887, Carter was once again elected to the State House, and served in the 1888 session. In 1890, Carter was a delegate to Mississippi's 1890 Constitutional Convention. On November 3, 1903, Carter was elected to the office of Lieutenant Governor of Mississippi, and served from January 18, 1904, to January 20, 1908.

== Personal life and death ==
Carter was a member of the Methodist Episcopal Church. He was a member of the United Confederate Veterans, the Masonic Order, the Knights Templar, the Nobles of the Mystic Shrine, and the Mystical Seven. He married Margaret C. McCallum in 1868. They had six children, named John McCallum, Prentiss Abner, George Henry, Annie Isabella, Charles Galloway, and Martha Ruth.

Carter died shortly after 6 AM on July 24, 1925, in Hattiesburg, Mississippi.
