= Earl L. Brewer =

American politician

Earl Leroy Brewer
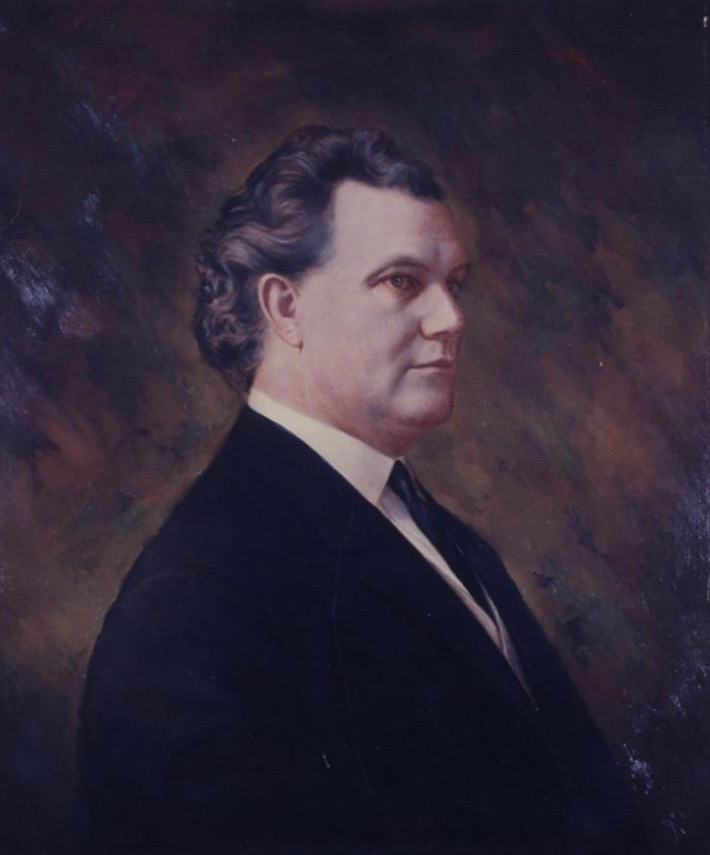

38th Governor of Mississippi
- In office January 16, 1912 – January 18, 1916
- Lieutenant: Theodore G. Bilbo
- Preceded by: Edmond Noel
- Succeeded by: Theodore G. Bilbo

Member of the Mississippi Senate
- In office January 1896 – January 1900

Personal details
- Born: August 11, 1869 near Vaiden, Mississippi, U.S.
- Died: March 10, 1942 (aged 72) Jackson, Mississippi, U.S.
- Resting place: Oakridge Cemetery
- Party: Democratic
- Spouse: Minnie Marion Block
- Relations: Susan Brownell (great-granddaughter)
- Profession: Lawyer

Earl Leroy Brewer (August 11, 1869 – March 10, 1942) was the Governor of Mississippi from 1912 to 1916. Elected as a Democrat, he was unopposed in the primary and won the governorship without ever making a single public campaign speech.

== Biography ==
Brewer was born in Carroll County, Mississippi, near the town of Vaiden. His father, Ratliff Rodney Brewer, had been a farmer, plantation manager and overseer, and a captain in the Confederate Army during the Civil War. His middle name came from his grandfather, Leroy Brewer (1793–1851), a Mississippi Delta pioneer who migrated from Elbert County, Georgia during the Treaty of Dancing Rabbit Creek. His uncle Leroy Jasper Brewer (1833–1911), who was mayor of Holcomb at the time of Earl's gubernatorial election, died just weeks before his nephew's inauguration.

Brewer attended the University of Mississippi and, after less than one year of study, obtained a Bachelor of Law degree in 1892. He immediately began practicing law (among his notable clients was Janie Jones, the widow of famed railroader Casey Jones, for whom he obtained a $2,650 settlement after Jones' death) and then was elected to the Mississippi State Senate in 1895. In 1902 he was appointed district attorney for the 11th District.

In 1907 he resigned as district attorney to run for governor. Brewer was narrowly defeated in his first attempt but won handily in the next campaign. As governor, Brewer promoted progressive reforms in several areas. Various laws affecting working conditions were passed, the constitution was changed to create an elective judiciary, banking laws were established to limit interest rates, and a Bureau of Vital Statistics was created.

During his term, there was a severe epidemic of pellagra in the state and other portions of the South. When the federal government sent Joseph Goldberger to study the disease and find a cure, Brewer offered full pardons to convicts who would participate in Goldberger's experiments. As a result of these studies, it was determined that a vitamin deficiency caused pellagra. Brewer also began a tradition of commuting the sentences of the convicted prisoners who served as servants at the Mississippi Governor's Mansion after his daughter appealed to him to free a convict who had acted as her bodyguard.

After his term, Brewer returned to legal practice in Bolivar County. In 1924, after an unsuccessful Senate run, he took the case of Martha Lum, a local Chinese American girl who had been denied admission to the Rosedale schools since she was not white. He was able to win a judgment in her favor at trial that was then reversed by the state Supreme Court because the state's school-segregation laws were meant to favor white children over all other races, not just Blacks. Brewer appealed to the U.S. Supreme Court but was unable to handle the case at that point, so he handed it off to a younger lawyer, and the Mississippi Supreme Court's decision was upheld, with Chief Justice William Howard Taft writing an opinion that greatly broadened the scope of acceptable school segregation nationwide.

Brewer had left Lum v. Rice to assist in representing the family of a Black man murdered following his acquittal on the charges of murdering the son of a white farmer. In 1936, he would represent three Black defendants accused of murder who had been convicted based on coerced confessions. Brewer argued and won their appeal to the United States Supreme Court in Brown v. Mississippi.

Brewer died in Jackson and is buried at Oakridge Cemetery in Clarksdale.

== Notable relatives ==
- Leroy Brewer I (1793-1851) - Grandfather and namesake of Gov. Brewer. He was an early Mississippi Delta pioneer; traveling from Elbert County, GA, with his brother William Fletcher Brewer.
- Captain Ratliff Rodney Brewer (1831-1881) - Father - Confederate Officer during the Civil War.
- Mayor Leroy Jasper Brewer II (1833-1911) - Uncle - Mayor of Holcomb, MS, Civil War officer, civil engineer, and County Surveyor of Carroll County, MS.
- Mayor John Ratliff Brewer (1853-1913) - 1st Cousin - Mayor of Holcomb, MS.
- Dr. Walter Chew Brewer (1874-1932) - 2nd Cousin - Mississippi's foremost surgeon at his death. He was killed in a pistol battle near the hospital that he owned.
- Rev. Leroy Jasper Brewer Sr. (1936-1987) - 1st Cousin 1R - Former President of the Baptist Convention of New England (called Southern Baptist General Association of New England at the time).
- Susan Brownell, great-granddaughter and cultural anthropologist on sport in China

Party political offices
Preceded by Edmond Noel	Democratic nominee for Governor of Mississippi; 1911	Succeeded by Theodore G. Bilbo
Political offices
Preceded by Edmond Noel	Governor of Mississippi; 1912–1916	Succeeded by Theodore G. Bilbo
