= Andrew H. Longino =

American politician (1854–1942)

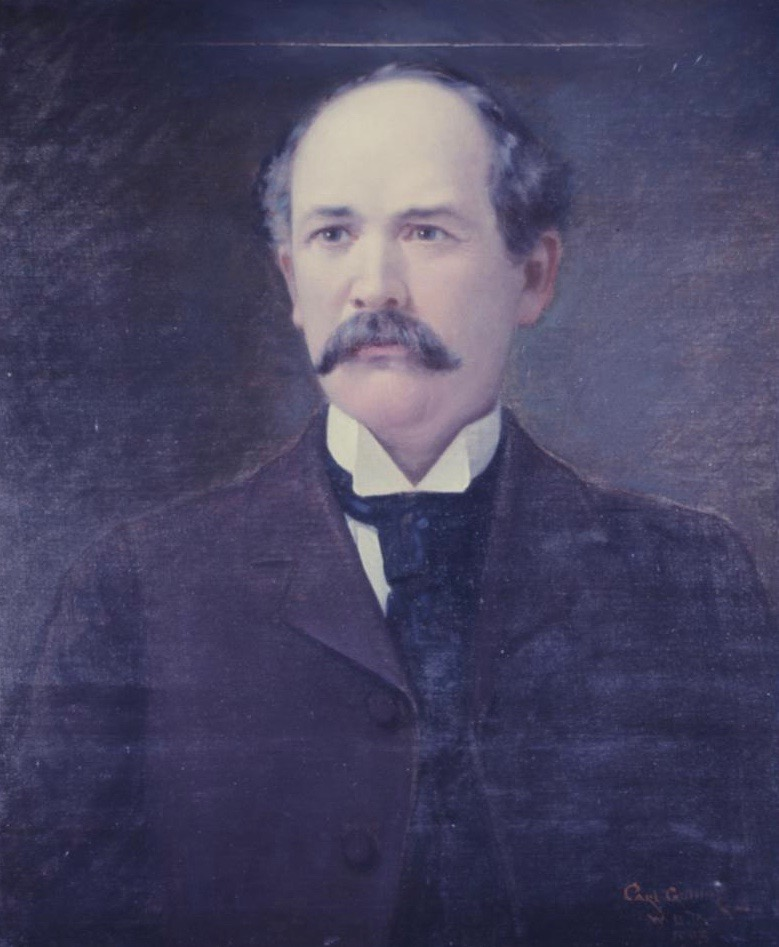

35th Governor of Mississippi
- In office January 16, 1900 – January 19, 1904
- Lieutenant: James T. Harrison
- Preceded by: Anselm J. McLaurin
- Succeeded by: James K. Vardaman

Member of the Mississippi Senate
- In office 1880-1884

Personal details
- Born: May 16, 1854 Lawrence County, Mississippi, U.S.
- Died: February 24, 1942 (aged 87) Jackson, Mississippi, U.S.
- Party: Democratic
- Spouse: Marion Buckley
- Profession: Lawyer

Andrew Houston Longino (May 16, 1854 – February 24, 1942) was an American politician from Mississippi who served as a Democrat in the Mississippi State Senate (1880–1884), the U.S. District Attorney (1888–1890), and Governor's offices (1900–1904).

== Early life and education ==
Longino was born in Lawrence County, Mississippi. He attained education at Mississippi College, where he graduated in 1875, and at the University of Virginia, where he earned a law degree in 1880.

The surname Longino is of Italian origin, although his family had resided in the American South since the eighteenth century. He has been identified as the third U.S. governor of Italian-American descent, after Caesar Rodney and William Paca who held office in the 18th century and had distant Italian ancestry.

== Political career and death ==
During his term as governor, Longino began a campaign to attract new industries to the state. He supervised designing and building a new Mississippi State Capitol still in use today. Also of note, the Mississippi Department of Archives and History was created and a new penitentiary at Parchman Farm was constructed during his administration.

Governor Longino invited president Theodore Roosevelt to a bear hunt in the Mississippi Delta, an event which inspired the creation of the teddy bear.

Longino died at age 87, and was interred at Cedar Lawn Cemetery in Jackson, Mississippi.

Party political offices
Preceded by Anselm J. McLaurin	Democratic nominee for Governor of Mississippi; 1899	Succeeded by James K. Vardaman
Political offices
Preceded by Anselm J. McLaurin	Governor of Mississippi; 1900-1904	Succeeded by James K. Vardaman
