= Coaching inn =

Historical inn serving coach travellers

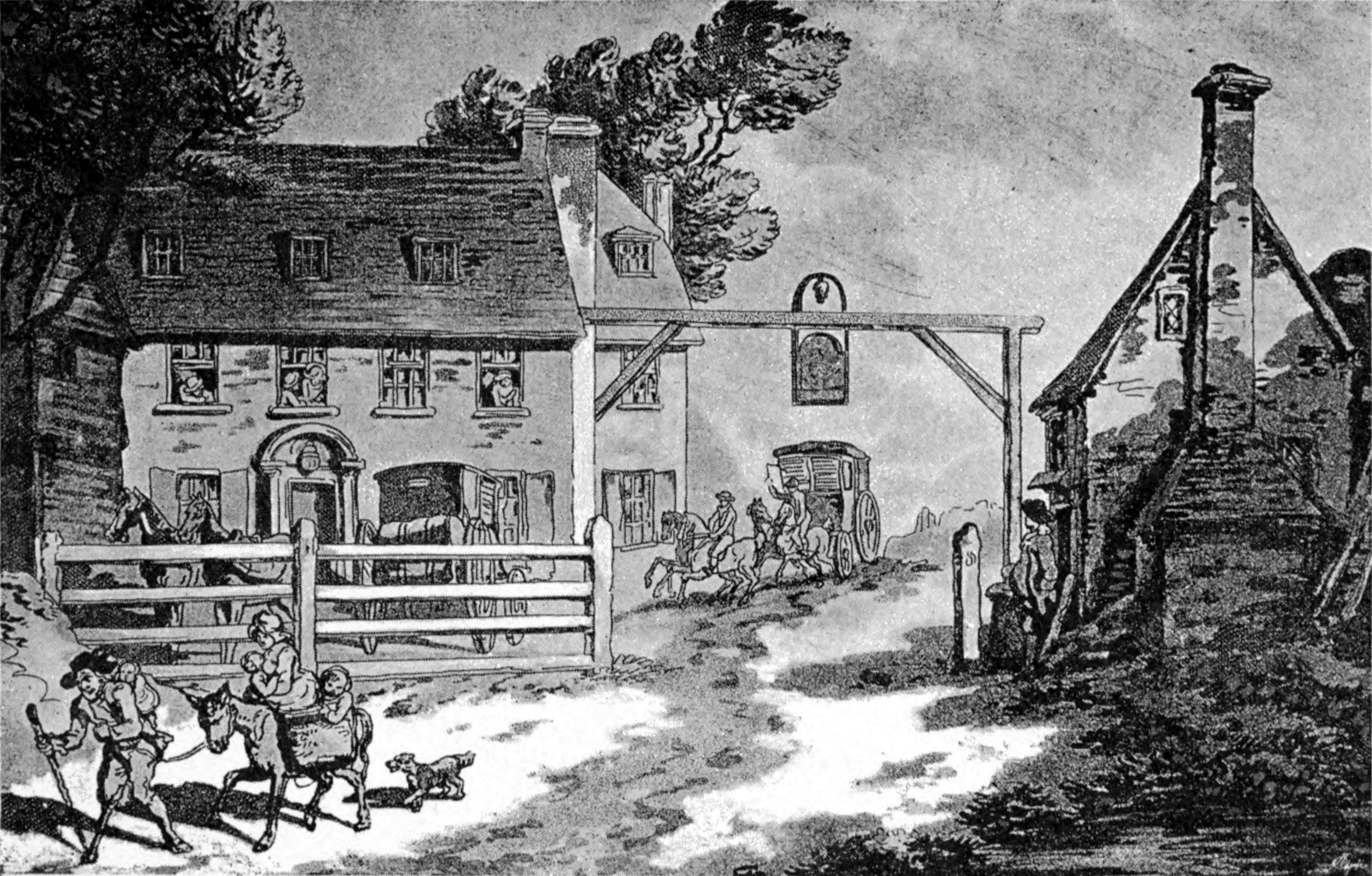
Painting of the first Cock Hotel in Sutton, Surrey by Thomas Rowlandson in 1789.

The coaching inn (also coaching house or staging inn) was a vital part of Europe's inland transport infrastructure until the development of the railway, providing a resting point (layover) for people and horses. The inn served the needs of travellers, for food, drink, and rest. The attached stables, staffed by hostlers, cared for the horses, including changing a tired team for a fresh one. Coaching inns were used by private travellers in their coaches, the public riding stagecoaches between one town and another, and (in England at least) the mail coach. Just as with roadhouses and caravanserais in other countries, although many survive, and some still offer overnight accommodation, in general coaching inns have lost their original function and now operate as ordinary pubs.

Coaching inns stabled teams of horses for stagecoaches and mail coaches and replaced tired teams with fresh teams. In America, stage stations performed these functions. Traditionally English coaching inns were seven miles (11 km) apart but this depended very much on the terrain. Some English towns had as many as ten such inns and rivalry between them was intense, not only for the income from the stagecoach operators but for the revenue for food and drink supplied to the passengers. Barnet, Hertfordshire still has an unusually high number of historic pubs along its high street due to its former position on the Great North Road from London to Scotland.

== Historic coaching inns ==
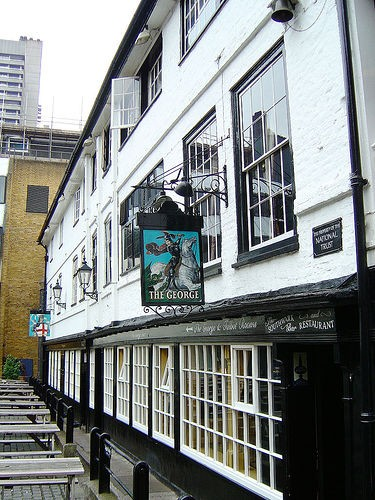
The George Inn, Southwark is the only galleried coaching inn to survive in London

The Black Lion in Cardigan (established 1105) is probably the oldest Welsh coaching inn. Other historic inns in Wales include the Black Boy Inn (built 1522) and the Groes Inn (1573).

The Bear, Oxford, was founded in 1774 as 'The Jolly Trooper' from the house of the stableman to the coaching inn 'The Bear Inn', on High Street. It acquired the name The Bear, and the history of the coaching inn, when The Bear Inn was converted into a private house in 1801.

There were many coaching inns in what is now central London. The only remaining one with the galleries to the bedrooms above is The George Inn, Southwark, owned by the National Trust and still run as a pub. Many have been demolished and plaques mark their location. A plaque on St. Martin's Le Grand commemorates the "Bull and Mouth" Inn. The Golden Cross House, opposite St Martin's in the Fields recalls the Golden Cross, Charing Cross coaching inn.

Other coaching inns lost their customers when the railway replaced the mail coach routes, and were closed down. Chockerup Inn in Western Australia is one example: it was abandoned when the Great Southern Railway opened in 1889, replacing the coach route between Albany and Perth.

== Cock and Bull ==
A pair of coaching inns along Watling Street in Stony Stratford are claimed to have given rise to the term "cock and bull stories". The claim is that stories by coach passengers would be further embellished as they passed between the two hostelries, "The Cock" and "The Bull", fuelled by ale and an interested audience. Hence any suspiciously elaborate tale would become a cock and bull story. However, there is no evidence to suggest that this is where the phrase originated. The phrase, first recorded in 1621, may instead be an allusion to Aesop's fables, with their incredible talking animals.

== Bibliography ==
- Coaching Era, The: Stage and Mail Coach Travel in and Around Bath, Bristol and Somerset, Roy Gallop, Fiducia (2003), ISBN 1-85026-019-2
- 'The English Urban Inn 1560–1750', Alan Everitt, in Perspectives in English Urban History, ed. By Alan Everitt, Palgrave Macmillan (1973), ISBN 978-1-349-00577-2 I
