= Free State of Jones (film) =

2016 film by Gary Ross

- Theatrical release poster
- Directed by: Gary Ross
- Screenplay by: Gary Ross
- Story by: Leonard Hartman; Gary Ross
- Produced by: Jon Kilik; Gary Ross; Scott Stuber
- Starring: Matthew McConaughey; Gugu Mbatha-Raw; Mahershala Ali; Keri Russell
- Cinematography: Benoît Delhomme
- Edited by: Pamela Martin; Juliette Welfling
- Music by: Nicholas Britell
- Production companies: Route One Entertainment; Vendian Entertainment; Bluegrass Films; Larger Than Life Productions
- Distributed by: STX Entertainment
- Release dates: June 16, 2016 (Atlanta); June 24, 2016 (United States)
- Running time: 139 minutes
- Country: United States
- Language: English
- Budget: $50 million
- Box office: $25 million

Free State of Jones is a 2016 American historical war film inspired by the life of Southern Unionist Newton Knight, who led a successful armed revolt against the Confederacy in Jones County, Mississippi, throughout the American Civil War. Written, co-produced, and directed by Gary Ross based on a story by Ross and Leonard Hartman, the film stars Matthew McConaughey as Knight, alongside Gugu Mbatha-Raw, Mahershala Ali, and Keri Russell. The story is based on the history of Jones County during the Civil War and the period immediately after it. The overall story follows the history of Jones County; some of the events portrayed are true. The film is credited as being "based on the books The Free State of Jones by Victoria E. Bynum and The State of Jones by Sally Jenkins and John Stauffer."

It was released in the United States by STXfilms on June 24, 2016. It received mixed reviews from critics and grossed $25 million against its $50 million production budget.

== Plot ==
Newton Knight, a soldier in the Confederate Army, deserts after learning of the Twenty Negro Law and witnessing the death of his nephew Daniel during the Second Battle of Corinth.

Knight brings Daniel's body home to Ellisville and reconnects with his wife, Serena. He befriends Rachel, a slave at a nearby plantation, who has secretly learned to read, after she treats his infant son's illness.

Newton's disenchantment with the Confederacy grows after he learns that soldiers have been seizing crops, livestock, and supplies from his neighbors, even though most are already struggling to feed their families. Newton threatens a Confederate officer, Lieutenant Barbour, at gunpoint; when Confederate militiamen are ordered to arrest him for treason, Newton is bitten by one of their attack dogs while trying to escape. Abolitionist-oriented Aunt Sally, a sympathetic community leader, has her servant George take him into the swamps, where he is put under the protection of runaway slave Moses Washington and his followers and is nursed back to health.

After the fall of Vicksburg, Confederate deserters flock into Jones County. Newton persuades his neighbors to provide him with weapons and organizes the deserters and slaves into a well-disciplined Southern Unionist militia. When they begin ambushing military convoys to take back their property, Barbour and his commanding officer, Colonel Hood, order their farms to be torched. Serena is forced to flee with her son as Newton cannot protect them. Hood offers a full pardon to any Unionist who agrees to rejoin the Confederate Army, but when some of Newton's men ask to be pardoned, Hood goes back on his word and orders them to be hanged.

The Unionists, appearing to accept defeat, persuade Hood to let them hold a funeral for the deceased under military guard. Suddenly, sharpshooters hidden under the church and in the coffins fire on the Confederates as the mourners take pistols from their coats and join in. The soldiers are killed, and Newton strangles Hood to death with his belt. Barbour escapes, but he and the remaining troops in the county are driven out by the Unionists, who declare the establishment of the "Free State of Jones". Swearing allegiance to the United States Federal Government, the Unionists manage to defend their territory against Confederate reinforcements for the remainder of the war.

Newton continues to fight racial inequality after the war. He helps free Moses' son from an "apprenticeship" to Rachel's former master. After Moses is lynched while registering freedmen to vote, Newton is seen participating in a march of voters to the polls while they sing "John Brown's Body". He eventually reconciles with Serena and has a son with Rachel. Since they are unable to legally marry, Newton arranges for Rachel to be deeded a parcel of his land to farm upon his death.

The film ends with Newton's great-grandson, Davis Knight, being arrested under Mississippi's anti-miscegenation laws in 1948. Since he has one-eighth of black ancestry, the law considers him to be black, and he therefore is ordered to annul his marriage to his white wife, which he refuses to do. He is sentenced to five years in prison for refusing to leave the state, but his conviction is reversed by the Mississippi Supreme Court in 1949, rather than risk the law being declared unconstitutional in light of the emerging civil rights movement.

== Cast ==
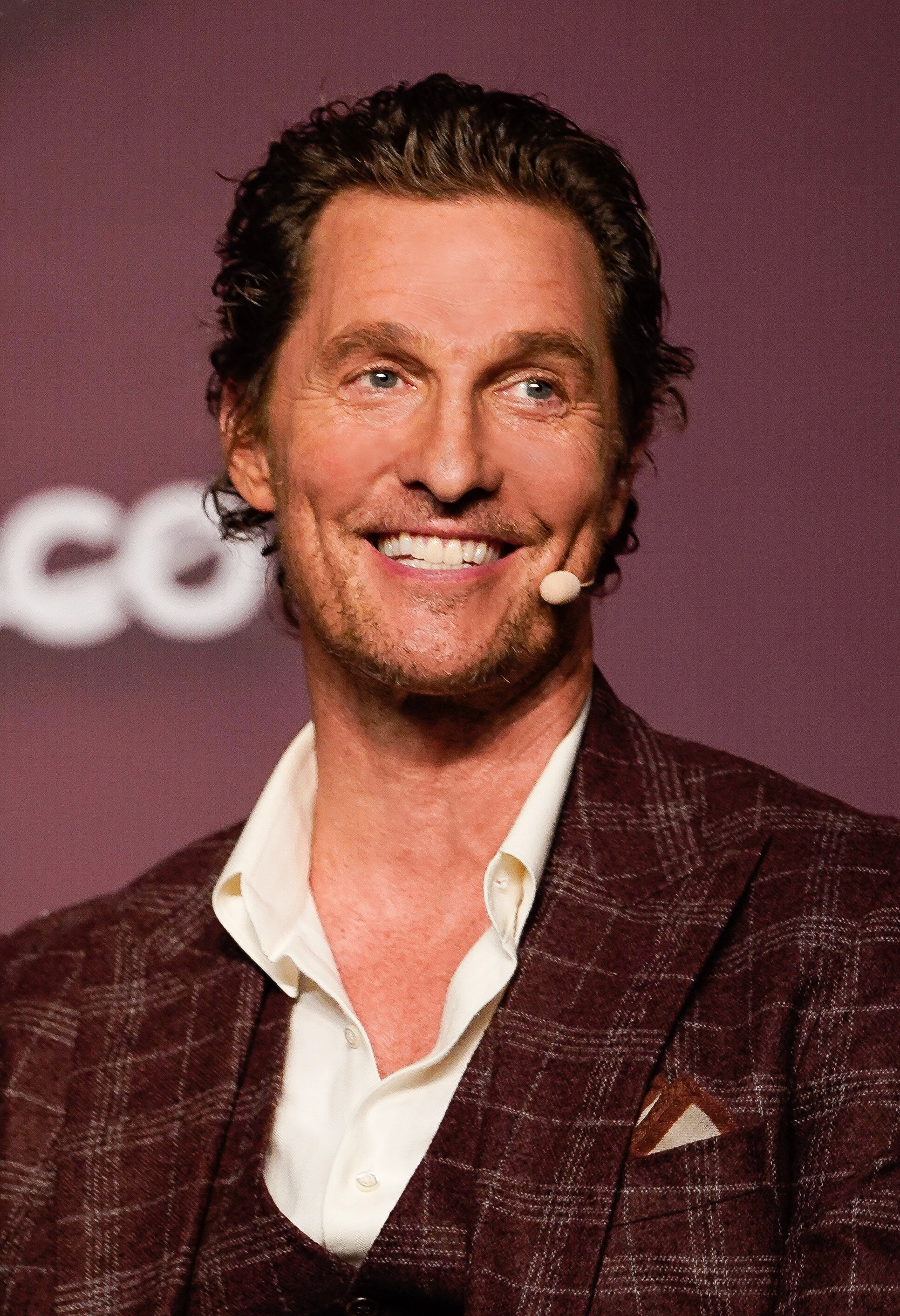
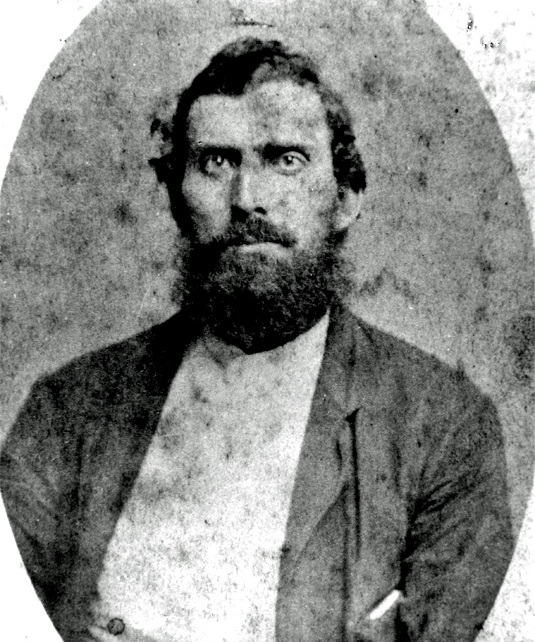
Actor Matthew McConaughey (pictured in 2019) portrays anti-Confederate rebellion leader Newton Knight.
- Matthew McConaughey as Newton Knight
- Gugu Mbatha-Raw as Rachel
- Mahershala Ali as Moses Washington
- Keri Russell as Serena Knight
- Christopher Berry as Jasper Collins
- Sean Bridgers as Will Sumrall
- Jacob Lofland as Daniel Knight
- Thomas Francis Murphy as Colonel Elias Hood
- Bill Tangradi as Lieutenant Barbour
- Brian Lee Franklin as Davis Knight
- Kerry Cahill as Mary
- Joe Chrest as James Eakins
- Jessica Collins as Annie
- Gary Grubbs as the Prosecutor
- Kirk Bovill as Merchant
- Donald Watkins as Wilson
- Artrial Clark as Eli
- Manny Penton as Surgeon
- Wayne Pére as Colonel Robert Lowry

== Production ==
=== Development ===
The film was a passion project for Ross, who spent ten years developing it. He was initially drawn to make the movie out of a desire to examine the Reconstruction era South, an era that, according to him, is poorly represented in film, quoting Gone with the Wind and The Birth of a Nation as examples of "the last movies that did it ... both of which didn't tell the truth." In preparation, Ross did a "tremendous amount of research", studying not only the Civil War but also the historiography of the war, the latter because he wanted "to debunk a lot of the myths" surrounding the events. Speaking to Slash Film about the research for the film, Ross remarked, "I don’t think I did anything but read for a couple of years".

Ross finished writing the film prior to working on The Hunger Games, although he struggled to find much in way of financing: he felt that working on The Hunger Games would help him, and thus declined to work on the sequels. Afterwards he still had trouble getting the movie made, which he attributes to the fact that "we're in a different kind of a popcorn universe now".

McConaughey's casting was announced in November 2014. Other casting was announced in early 2015. Angelo Piazza III of Marksville, Louisiana, and his Jack's Powder Keg Company participated in the production with their cannon and black powder.

=== Filming ===
Principal photography began on February 23, 2015, and was scheduled to end on May 28. On March 9, Adam Fogelson, Chairman of STX Entertainment, announced the start of the production in and around New Orleans, with the release of a first look photo. In May, shooting was scheduled for Clinton, with East Feliciana Parish as a filming set. On May 25, some filming took place at Chicot State Park near Ville Platte.

== Release ==
The film was pushed back from its original release date of March 11, 2016, to May 13 and finally June 24, 2016. The first trailer was released on January 9, 2016.

=== Home media ===
Free State of Jones was released by Universal Studios Home Entertainment on Digital HD on September 6, 2016, and on DVD and Blu-ray on September 20, 2016.

== Reception ==
=== Box office ===
Free State of Jones grossed $20.8 million in North America and $4.2 million in other territories for a worldwide total of $25 million, against a production budget of $50 million.

The film was released in the United States and Canada on June 24, 2016, alongside Independence Day: Resurgence and The Shallows and was projected to gross around $10 million in its opening weekend from 2,815 theaters. The film grossed $365,000 from its Thursday previews and $2.7 million on its first day. In its opening weekend the film grossed $7.6 million, finishing 6th at the box office behind Finding Dory ($73 million), Independence Day: Resurgence ($41 million), Central Intelligence ($18.2 million), The Shallows ($16.8 million) and The Conjuring 2 ($7.7 million).

=== Critical response ===
On Rotten Tomatoes, a review aggregator, the film has an approval rating of 48% based on 192 reviews and an average rating of 5.5/10. The website's critical consensus reads, "Free State of Jones has the noblest of intentions, but they aren't enough to make up for its stilted treatment of a fascinating real-life story." On Metacritic, the film has a score of 53 out of 100 based on reviews from 38 critics, indicating "mixed or average" reviews. Audiences polled by CinemaScore gave the film an average grade of "A−" on an A+ to F scale.

Film critic Ann Hornaday of The Washington Post said, Gary Ross "has insisted that he didn't want Free State of Jones to become another white savior movie, but that's precisely what it is, especially during scenes when the murderous injustice of slavery is refracted through Knight’s frustrated tears." Hornaday said the film could have avoided the trope by focusing more on Knight's alliance with a former slave or his relationships with his wife and an enslaved house servant. The Atlantic's Vann R. Newkirk II said, "To say that McConaughey's portrayal of Newton Knight is a white savior perhaps undersells the trope... A better film would have muddled the clean white-savior narrative with an actual exploration of what the racial politics of a mixed-race insurgency in the South might have been like."

The New York Times selected it as a "critic's pick". Reviewer A. O. Scott called it "a neglected and fascinating chapter in American history" and said it used "the tools of Hollywood spectacle to restore a measure of clarity to our understanding of the war and its aftermath." Scott also said, "while Mr. Ross's story makes Newton unambiguously heroic, this is not yet another film about a white savior sacrificing himself on behalf of the darker-skinned oppressed. Nor for that matter is it the story of a white sinner redeemed by the superhuman selflessness of black people. Free State of Jones is a rarer thing: a film that tries to strike sparks of political insight from a well-worn genre template."

The New Yorker film critic Richard Brody gave it a positive review, saying, "It's tempting to shunt Free State of Jones into the familiar genre of the white-savior tale, but Newton Knight appears as something else—not so much as a savior but as an avatar of a new South. By seeing his own interests clearly and considering the economic and social structure of his locale and his nation insightfully, he's able to transcend heritage and history and to forge a community, both during and after the war, that will be fair, inclusive, and—yes—post-racial."

== Soundtrack ==
- Beautiful Dreamer - Written by Stephen Foster
- Piney Woods Swamp - Performed by Nicholas Britell, Tim Fain, Shawn Conley & Shawn Pelton
- Napoleon Crossing the Rhine - Traditional
- What Must Be Done - Written by Nick Cave and Warren Ellis
- Battle Cry of Freedom - Written by George Frederick Root
- Rodney Prepares For Fight - Composed by Dickon Hinchliffe
- I'm Crying - Written and Performed by Lucinda Williams
- Battle of Corinth - Composed by Nicholas Britell
- Taking Daniel Home - Performed by Nicholas Britell, Tim Fain & Rob Moose
- They Took Everything - Composed by Nicholas Britell
- Finding Home (uncredited) - Performed by Nicholas Britell, Tim Fain & Rob Moose
- Soldier's Joy - Traditional
- July 1863 / Loyalty Oath - Composed by Nicholas Britell
- Perfect Charity - Composed by Nicholas Britell
- "Resistance' - Performed by Nicholas Britell, Tim Fain, Shawn Conley & Shawn Pelton
- The Letter - Performed by Nicholas Britell, Tim Fain & Rob Moose
- Let There Be Light - Composed by Nicholas Britell
- Hanging the Deserters - Performed by Nicholas Britell, Tim Fain & Rob Moose
- Killing the Colonel - Composed by Nicholas Britell
- Reconstruction - Performed by Nicholas Britell, Tim Fain & Rob Moose
- Voter Suppression - Performed by Nicholas Britell
- John Madison Knight - Composed by Nicholas Britell
- Postlude - Performed by Nicholas Britell
- The Free State of Jones - Performed by Nicholas Britell, Tim Fain & Caitlin Sullivan

Source: media notes

== See also ==
- Slave states and free states
- Tap Roots, a 1948 film loosely based on the life story of Newton Knight
- Voting rights in the United States
