= Confederate Conscription Acts 1862–1864 =

Confederate policy

Confederate States Congress
- Long title: Acts to further provide for the public defence
- Territorial extent: Confederate States
- Enacted by: Confederate States Congress
- Enacted: First Conscription Act April 26, 1862
- Enacted: Second Conscription Act September 27, 1862, Third Conscription Act February 17, 1864
- Introduced by: Jefferson Davis
- Status: Repealed

The Confederate Conscription Acts, 1862 to 1864, were a series of measures taken by the Confederate government to procure the manpower needed to fight the American Civil War.

The First Conscription Act, passed April 16, 1862, made any white male between 18 and 35 years old liable to three years of military service. On September 27, 1862, the Second extended the age limit to 45 years. The Third, passed February 17, 1864, changed this to 17 to 50 years old, for service of an unlimited period.

Originally, anyone drafted could hire a substitute, a provision that was heavily criticized, and abolished on December 28, 1863. In addition, an act of April 21, 1862, created reserved occupations excluded from the draft. On October 11, 1862. A new exemption act, soon dubbed the Twenty Negro Law, was approved. The Third Conscription limited the number of reserved occupations, but, although much criticized, kept the "Twenty Negro Law" in modified form. In order to encourage volunteering the First Act allowed existing regiments to elect new officers. The Third Act also allowed officer election in regiments formed by the new age groups coming into military service.

The debate over conscription reflected the political struggle in the Confederacy between those who saw it as another example of the threat to freedom posed by the centralization of power, the suspension of habeas corpus being another. Their opponents viewed a strong central executive and these measures as essential to preserve Southern independence.

Several states passed legislation against conscription; in addition to simply hiding, draftees violently resisted conscription officers of the Confederate government, mirroring similar disputes in the North, most famously the New York City draft riots. Some counties seceded from the Confederacy, declaring for the United States government; by 1864, the Southern draft had become virtually unenforceable.

== Background ==
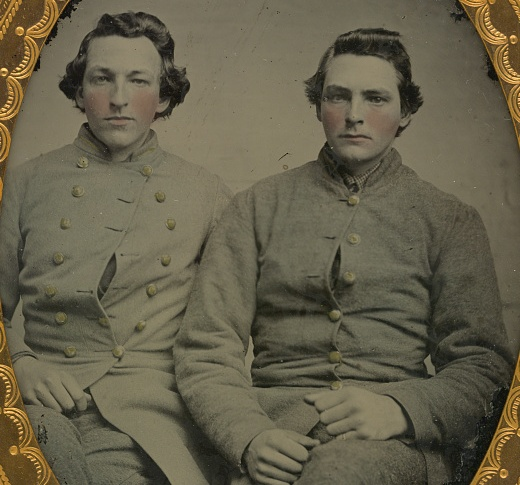
Two brothers from 34th North Carolina Infantry Regiment who volunteered in the spring of 1861.

In April 1861, roughly half of those who enlisted in the Provisional Army of the Confederate States did so for a period of three years, the rest for twelve months only. In December, with the end of the war nowhere in sight, the Confederate authorities faced the loss of 148 regiments, or nearly half the army, when their enlistments expired in March 1862.

In December, the Confederate Congress tried to induce reenlistment by offering bounties, a sixty-day furlough, and the option of joining new regiments with new elections of the officers. Lee pronounced this disastrous, and argued compulsory conscription was essential to win the war. In April 1862, Congress enacted the first conscription act in American history.

== Eligibility for military service ==
The Act of April 16, 1862 made all white men, 18 to 35 years old, available for military service during three years. The one-year volunteers saw their enlistment period extended with two years. The draft would be administered by the Confederate Secretary of War who would establish draft quotas for the several states of the Confederacy. On September 27, 1862, the Congress extended the age limit to 45 years of age and on February 17, 1864 all white men, 17 to 50 years old, became available for military service for an unlimited period, i.e. "for the war", although those 17 to 18 years and 45 to 50 years old, would constitute a state defense reserve, not serving outside their resident state.

== Substitution for military service ==
Anyone drafted for military service had the right to hire a man to serve in his stead. The substitute could not be a person available for military service under the Conscription Act, and had to be fit for duty. This provision was heavily criticized, and eventually the Congress abolished it on December 28, 1863. On January 5, 1864, those who had hired substitutes became eligible for the draft.

== Exemptions from military service ==
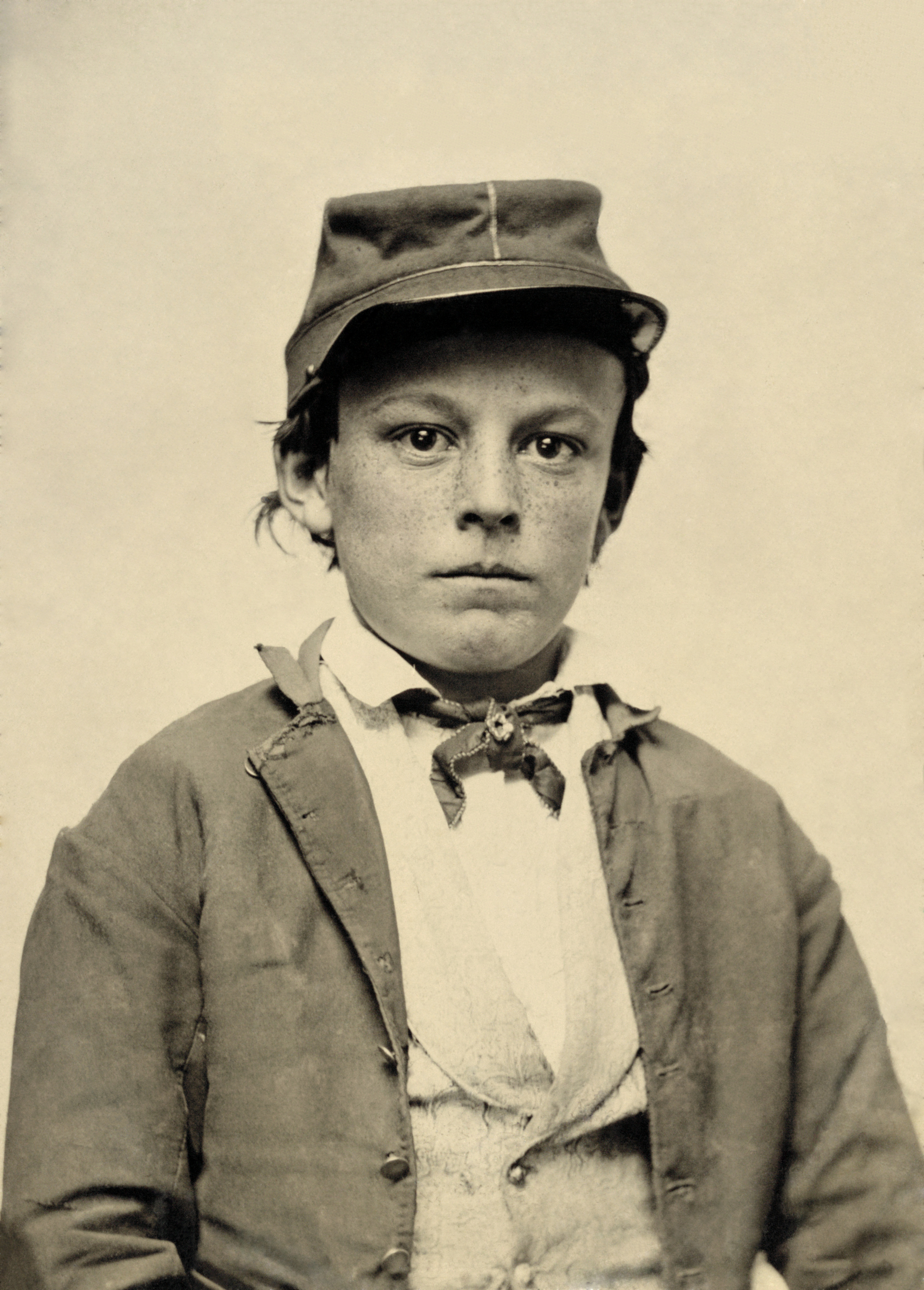
Underage soldier

In order to sustain a civil society as well as maintain production of munitions of war, an act of April 21, 1862 exempted persons in a number of reserved occupations from the draft. Among those exempted were confederate and state officials, Christian Ministers, professors and teachers, druggists, hospital attendants, mine, foundry, cotton and wool factory workers. On October 11, 1862, a new exemption act was approved, among other changes it also exempted overseers on plantations with more than 20 slaves. When, on February 17, 1864, the Congress extended the draft to men 50 years of age, it also limited the number of reserved occupations.

== Election of officers ==
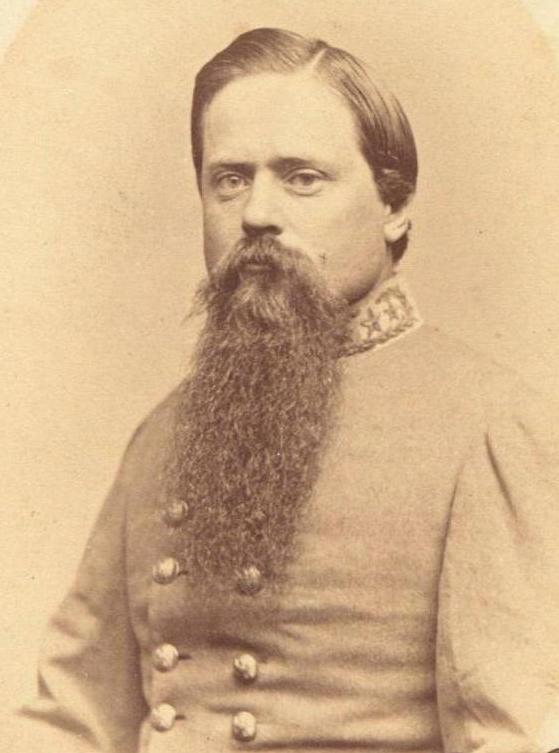
Fitzhugh Lee was elected colonel of 1st Virginia Cavalry in elections mandated by the First Conscription Act.

One aim of the Act of 1862 was to encourage volunteering; hence each existing regiments were allowed to elect new officers, 40 days after the Conscription Act went into effect. Men eligible for the draft could volunteer to a regiment of their choice and participate in the officer election, provided they did it within the 40 days. Those drafted would be assigned regiments without say of the draftees.

Similar directives were issued pertaining to the new classes of men eligible for military service under the Act of February 17, 1864 (see above). They could within 30 days, east of the Mississippi, and within 60 days west of the river, form volunteer companies and elect their own officers, and serve as minutemen. Those not volunteering would still be formed into companies and regiments, electing their own company and regimental officers.

== Debate over conscription ==
The original proposition for a Confederate draft came from Robert E. Lee. With approval of President Jefferson Davis, Lee detailed Captain Charles Marshall of his staff to draw up the text for a proposed conscription act. President Davis thought a draft was the only available solution to the Confederate military manpower crisis. Compulsory military recruitment would also ensure that the burden of defending the South fell on all citizens, not just the most patriotic members of society. But not all Confederate congressmen agreed with the president. Texas senator William Simpson Oldham, claimed that draft would call in question the courage and individualism of the Southern people, while threatening the Southern society with military centralization and despotism of European proportions. Yet, military necessity made the act easily pass both houses, and it became law on April 16, 1862.

The First Conscription Act was also severely criticized by many adherents of traditional Jeffersonian democracy outside of Congress. Among them was one of the most obstreperous critics of the Confederate government's centralization of power during the Civil War, Governor Joseph E. Brown of Georgia. He regarded the Act unconstitutional, since the Confederate Constitution did not explicitly grant the government the power to introduce universal military service. According to James M. McPherson, President Davis answered his Jeffersonian critics with traditional Federalist arguments; conscription was "necessary and proper" in order to effectuate the constitutional mandate for the government to provide for the common defense. Other critics, like Alabama governor John Gill Shorter, faulted the draft on moral grounds; the Southern cause could only be saved by the sacrifices of liberty loving men. For the other Texas senator, Louis Wigfall, such talk was useless; "We must have the heavy battalions".

The Second Conscription Act speedily sailed through Congress; introduced on August 18, it was passed on September 27, 1862. Only Senators Oldham of Texas and Orr of South Carolina voted against it in the senate. Although Caleb Herbert of Texas severely denounced the act in the House, two of his Texas colleagues rejected his claim to speak for Texas, and maintained that the people of the state understood the need for a draft and that the time for constitutional doubts was long gone. The Third Conscription Act of February 17, 1864, was passed without serious opposition. Senator Wigfall of Texas and others demanded an even more extensive draft. Outside of Congress, however, the clamor against conscription rose to new heights. Vice President Alexander Stephens, supported by Robert Toombs, declared the draft useless and unconstitutional.

The debate over conscription was but one facet of the political struggle in the Confederacy between the critics of centralized power, who saw conscription, suspension of Habeas Corpus and other actions of the Confederate government as a threat to fundamental freedoms, and the defenders of these actions, who saw a strong central government, and especially a powerful executive, as essential for the maintenance of Southern independence in face of large Union armies bent on destroying it. Most of the critics had their political base in states like Georgia or South Carolina, quite removed from serious military operations. The most stringent defenders of strong military legislation, on the other hand, were Congressmen and Senators elected from Kentucky and Missouri, virtually exiled from their Union-occupied and severely divided home states.

== Resistance to conscription ==
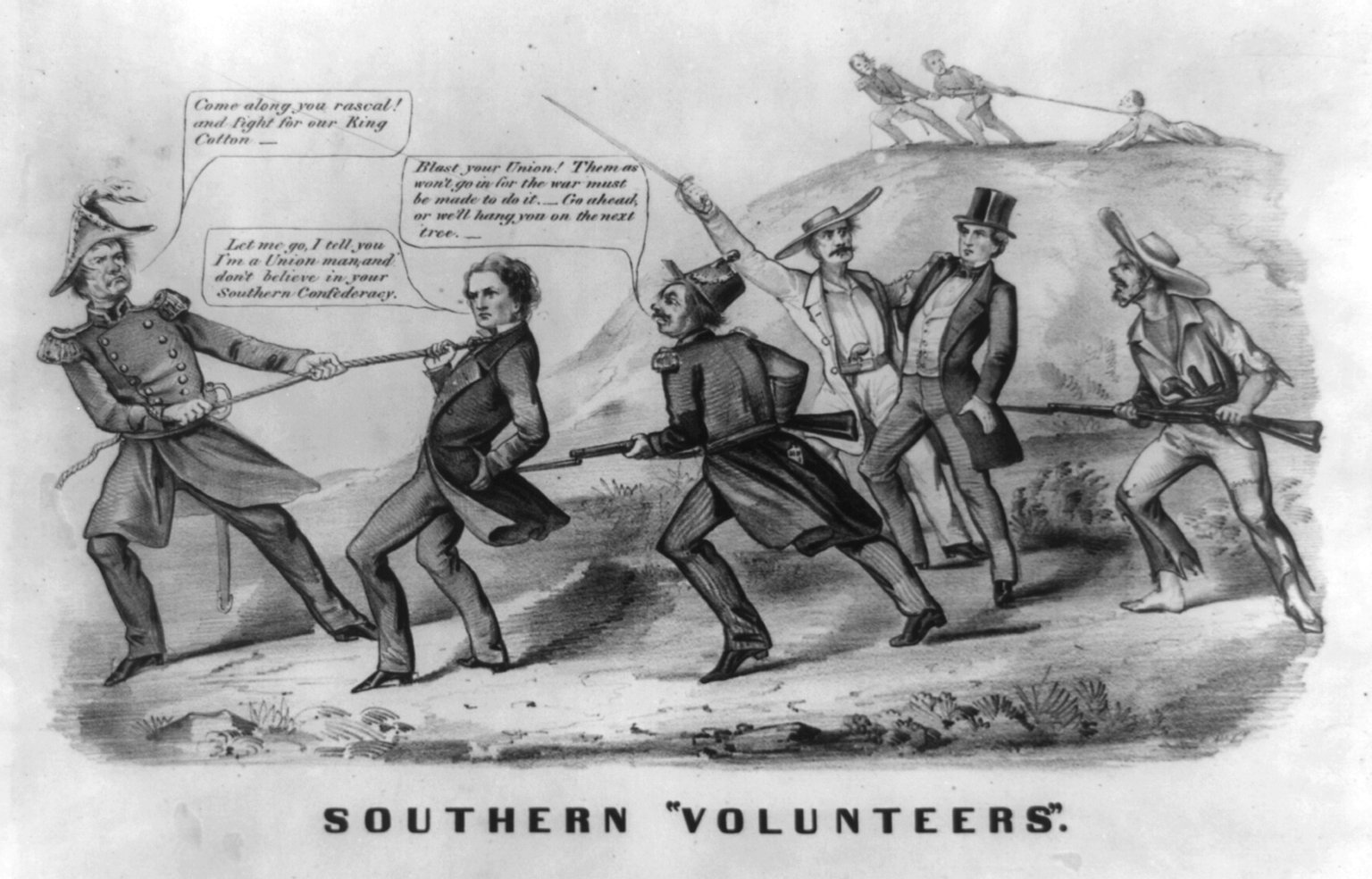
1862 Northern cartoon mocking Confederate conscription

Substitution and the Exemption Act of October 11, 1862, soon dubbed the Twenty Negro Law, created hostile reactions from the poorer members of the Southern society and spread from drafted recruits into the army, causing concern for the morale of the fighting men. While substitution eventually was abolished, the presence of white males on the plantations was seen as indispensable in a slave society. The concerns were not only about maintaining the productivity of the enslaved labor, but also for the perceived need to protect white women from black males.

The discontent became widespread and even found its way into the political elite. The North Carolina legislature wanted the "Twenty Negro Law" repealed as a privilege for the rich. The anti-war feelings were strong in the Appalachian region of the state and conscription was one of its major causes. While criticizing President Davis, Governor Zebulon Vance managed to keep his state in line, preventing any serious threat to the war effort. Neither was the political opposition in Georgia a serious threat to Confederate military policy, in spite of Governor Brown's loud pronouncements. He was successful in manipulating the system in order to exempt all the state's civil and military officials from conscription. Yet, when he tried to build an opposition block in the state, with the support of Vice President Alexander Stephens and Robert Toombs, he failed.

From 1863 several states enacted laws protecting civil and military officials of the state from the conscription. Both North Carolina and Mississippi exempted almost every state, county and militia officer. Such laws were generally upheld by the state courts. Attempts to have the courts issue writs of Habeas Corpus in order to free men drafted into the Confederate Army failed, however, in all states but North Carolina. In Georgia, the State supreme court upheld the constitutionally of the conscription, in a ruling that was attacked by Governor Brown, but defended by the legislature. The North Carolina Supreme Court, though, did not hesitate to issue writs of Habeas Corpus on behalf of draftees, and declared that State courts had concurrent jurisdiction with the Confederate courts in such cases. Yet, the Secretary of War refused to accept the courts decisions.

Farmers in the North Carolina Piedmont saw their lives severely disrupted by the draft. Three years in the army meant severe hardships for their families as well as a risk of losing the improvements they had made on their farms. At public meetings they expressed their opposition to the several conscription acts. Once forced into the army, many did not stay; desertion became rampant. Having returned to their homes, they created secret self-defense groups in order to stay out of the army. Local home guards were tasked with apprehending deserters, but community resistance made their missions difficult and at the end of the war 12,000 North Carolinians had run away from the Confederate army (about ten percent of the total serving force from the state). In the poor mountain area of the state, armed resistance group displayed their strength. While the draft resisting farmers of the Piedmont still identified with the Southern cause, although balking at the extreme actions of the Confederate government, the mountain people rejected the whole concept of being governed by what they perceived as a slave-owning oligarchy. Armed actions between draft resisters and government troops took place, with several hundred or even thousand resisters fighting the Confederate Home Guards and the Confederate Army.

Resistance to impressment of food, draft evasion, desertion, latent unionism, and armed opposition to the Confederate government created a situation akin to a civil war within the civil war in some areas of the South. In those areas, anti-government "regulators" controlled whole counties and fought a partisan war against Confederate authority. Some of them aligned with Unionist and peace organizations such as the Arkansas Peace Society and the Red Strings. According to historian David Williams, by 1864 the Southern draft had become virtually unenforceable. Other scholars claim that draft evasion in the South, where manpower was scarcer than in the North, contributed to the Confederate defeat.

== Appendix 1: Exempted classes under the Act of April 21, 1862 ==
- All in the service or employ of the Confederate States
- Judicial and executive officers of Confederate or state governments
- Members of both houses of the Congress, and of the state legislatures, and their respective officers
- Clerks of the officers of the Confederate and state governments allowed by law
- Mail carriers, ferrymen on post routes, pilots and persons engaged in marine services, persons in actual service on river and railroad routes of transportation, telegraphic operators
- Ministers of religion in regular discharge of ministerial duties
- All engaged in working iron mines, furnaces and foundries
- Journeymen printers actually employed in printing newspapers
- Presidents and professors of colleges, teachers having as many as 20 scholars
- Superintendents of public hospitals, lunatic asylums and the regular nurses and attendants therein
- Teachers employed in the institutions for the deaf and dumb and blind
- In each apothecary store now established and doing business, one apothecary in good standing who is a practical druggist
- Superintendents and operatives in wool and cotton factories

== Appendix 2: Exempted classes under the Act of October 11, 1862 ==
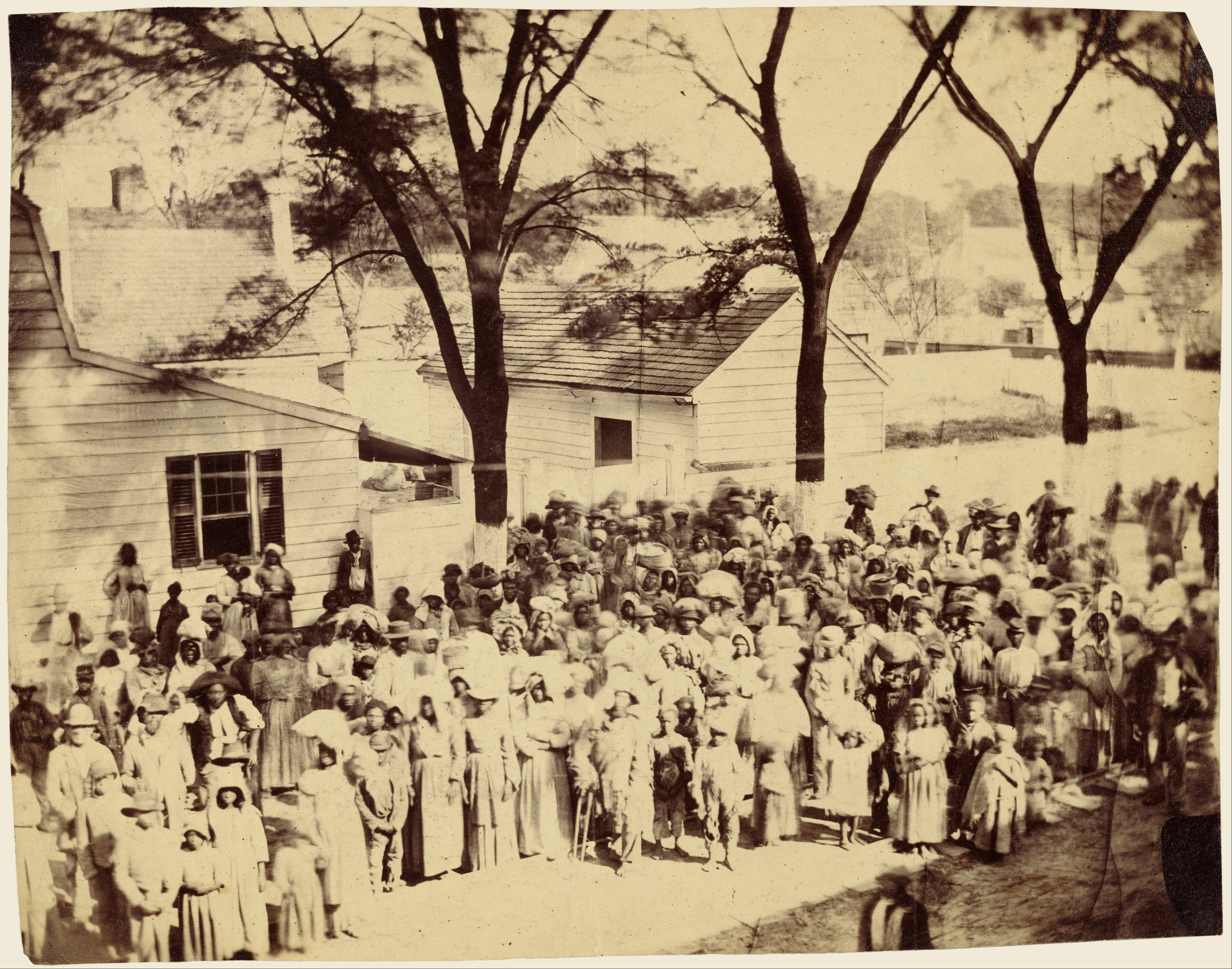
The Twenty Negro Law was the most divisive element of the Act of October 11, 1862.

- The Vice President of the Confederate States, the officers judicial and executive of the Confederate and state governments, including postmasters appointed by the President and confirmed by the Senate, and such clerks in their offices approved by the Postmaster General (excluding all other postmasters and clerks)
- The members of both houses of the Confederate Congress, and of the legislatures of the several states, and of their respective officers (except such state officers that the several states have declared or may declare by law to be liable to militia duty), all clerks now in the offices of the Confederate and state governments authorized by law, receiving salaries or fees
- All volunteer troops raised by any state since the Act of April 16, 1862, while such troops are in active service under state authority (except persons eligible for military service under the Act of April 16, 1862)
- Pilots and persons engaged in merchant marine service
- Presidents, superintendents, conductors, treasurers, chief clerks, engineers, managers, station agents, section masters, two expert track hands for each section of eight miles, and mechanics in active service and employment of railroad companies (not including laborers, porters, and messengers)
- Presidents, general superintendents, and operators of telegraph companies, as well as local superintends and operators of such companies (not to exceed four in each locality, except in the Capital city of the Confederate States)
- Presidents, superintendents, captains, engineers, chief clerks and mechanics in the active service of companies engaged in river and canal transportation, captains of boats and engineers therein employed
- One editor for each newspaper being published at the passage of this act, and such employees that are indispensable to the publication of such newspaper
- The Public Printers of the Confederate and state governments, and such journeyman printers that are indispensable to the public printing
- Ministers of religion authorized to preach according to the rules of his sect and who is regularly employed in the discharge of his ministerial duties
- Physicians who are and have been for the last 5 years in actual and regular practice
- Shoemakers, tanners, blacksmiths, Wagon-makers, millers and their engineers, millwrights, skilled and actually employed, working for the public
- Superintendents of public hospitals, lunatic asylums, and the regular physicians, nurses and attendants therein, and teachers employed in institutions for the deaf, dumb, and blind
- In each apothecary store now established and doing business, one apothecary in good standing who is a practical druggist
- Superintendents and operators in wool and cotton factories, paper mills, and superintendents and managers of wool carding machines
- Presidents and teachers of colleges, theological seminaries, academies, and schools, who has been regularly engaged as such for two years before the passage of this act
- Artisans, mechanics and employees in Government establishments for the manufacture of munitions of war, saddles, harnesses, and army supplies
- Artisans, mechanics and employees in the establishment of Government contractors furnishing munitions of war
- Superintendents, managers, mechanics and miners employed in the production of salt to the extent of twenty bushels per day, and of lead and iron, and all persons engaged in making coke for smelting and manufacture of iron, regular miners in coal mines, and colliers engaged in making charcoal for making pig and bar iron (not including laborers, messengers, wagoners and servants, except government and government contractor establishment)
- One male citizen for every 500 head of cattle, for every 250 head of horses or mules, and one shepherd for every 500 head of sheep (provided there is no white adult male not liable to military service engaged in raising said stock)
- One person, either as owner, agent or overseer, on each plantation on which one white person is required to be kept by laws of any state, or in states no such laws, one person as owner, agent or overseer, on each plantation of twenty negroes, and for every twenty negroes on two or more plantations within five miles of each other, each having less than twenty negroes, the oldest of owners of overseers of such plantations (provided there is no white adult male not liable to military service on the plantations)
- Members of the regiment raised by the State of Texas for frontier defense
- Members of the Society of Friends, and the association of Dunkards, Nazarens and Mennonites (provided that they pay a tax of $500 each or hire a substitute)
- Such other persons that the President shall be satisfied on account of justice, equity or necessity ought to be exempted

Through an act of April 14, 1863, the Congress furthermore exempted contractors for the carrying of mail, and the drivers of post coaches and hacks, from military service.

== Appendix 3: Exempted classes under the Act of February 17, 1864 ==
- The Vice President of the Confederate States, the members and officers of Congress and of the several state legislatures, and such other Confederate or state officers as the president or governors of the respective states may certify to be necessary
- Ministers of religion authorized to preach according to the rules of his church and who at the passage of this act is regularly employed in the discharge of his ministerial duties
- Superintendents and physicians of asylums for the deaf, dumb, and blind, and of the insane
- One editor for each newspaper being published at the passage of this act, and such employees that are indispensable to the publication of such newspaper
- The Public Printers of the Confederate and state governments, and such journeyman printers that are indispensable to the public printing
- One skilled apothecary in each apothecary store, who was doing business as such apothecary on October 10, 1862, and has continued said business with intermission since then
- Physicians (not including dentists) over the age of 30, who are and have been for the last 7 years in actual and regular practice
- Presidents and teachers of colleges, theological seminaries, academies, and schools (with over 20 students), who has been regularly engaged as such for two years before the passage of this act
- Superintendents of public hospitals established by law before the passage of this act, and such physicians and nurses that are indispensable
- One agriculturalist or overseer on each farm or plantation on which there are at least 15 able-bodied field hands between the ages of 16 and 50, and no adult white male not eligible for military service, provided that exempted will within 12 months sell to the government at fixed price 100 pounds of bacon or pork for each slave age 16 and 50, and bind himself to sell to the government or families of soldiers provisions and grain at fixed prices
- Presidents, treasurers, auditors, superintendents, and such indispensable officers and employees of any railroad company engaged in transportation for the government, not exceeding one person for each mile of railroad actually used for military transportation
- Contractors for the carrying of mail, and the drivers of post coaches and hacks
- The Secretary of War may at the direction of the President exempt other persons on account of public necessity or in the pursuit of agriculture
- No person heretofore having been exempted on religious grounds, and who has paid the taxes levied to relive him of service, shall be required to render military service under this act

== Sources ==
- Bell, Walter F. (2013). "Draft Dodgers". In Tucker, Spencer C.: American Civil War: The Definitive Encyclopedia and Document Collection. Santa Barbara, California.
- Cline, Tyler (2014). "Class Conflict and the Confederate Conscription Acts in North Carolina, 1862-1864." Honors College, 164.
- Cooper, William J., Jr. (2001). Jefferson Davis, American. New York: Vintage Books.
- Mathews, James M. (1862) "Public Laws of the Confederate States of America, Passed at the First Session of the First Congress; 1862." The statutes at large of the Confederate States of America. Richmond: R.M. Smith, Printer to Congress.
- Mathews, James M. (1862a) "Public Laws of the Confederate States of America, Passed at the Second Session of the First Congress; 1862." The statutes at large of the Confederate States of America. Richmond: R.M. Smith, Printer to Congress.
- Mathews, James M. (1863) "Public Laws of the Confederate States of America, Passed at the Third Session of the First Congress; 1863." The statutes at large of the Confederate States of America. Richmond: R.M. Smith, Printer to Congress.
- Mathews, James M. (1864). "Public Laws of the Confederate States of America, Passed at the Fourth Session of the First Congress; 1863-64." The statutes at large of the Confederate States of America. Richmond: R.M. Smith, Printer to Congress.
- McPherson, James M (1990). Battle Cry of Freedom. Penguin Books.
- Morgan, Meghan Hamilton (2002). "A Brief History of Conscription 1812-2002." University of Tennessee Honors Thesis Projects.
- Rable, George C. (1994). The Confederate Republic. The University of North Carolina Press.
- Ramage, James A. (2010). Gray Ghost. The University Press of Kentucky.
- Thomas, Emory M. (1997) Robert E. Lee. New York: W.W. Norton & Company.
- White, G. Edward (2011). "Recovering the Legal History of the Confederacy." Washington and Lee Law Review 68.
- Williams, David (2008). Bitterly Divided: The South's Inner Civil War. New York: The New Press.
