= Reserved occupation =

Occupation exempt from military service

A reserved occupation (also known as essential services) is an occupation considered important enough to a country that those serving in such occupations are exempt or forbidden from military service. In a total war, such as the Second World War, where most fit men of military age were conscripted into the armed forces, exceptions were given to those who performed jobs vital to the country and the war effort which could not be abandoned or performed by others. Not only were such people exempt from being conscripted, they were often prohibited from enlisting on their own initiative, and were required to remain in their posts. Examples of reserved occupations include medical practitioners and police officers, but what is or is not a reserved occupation will depend on war needs and a country's particular circumstances.

== Reserved occupations in the UK in World War I ==
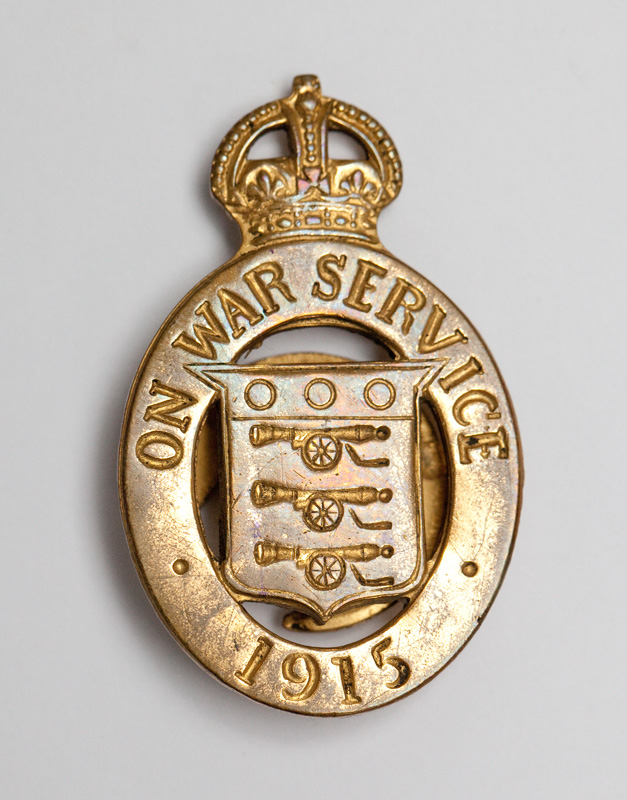
Badge given to a steelworker in 1915 to show that he was in a reserved occupation, and thus avoid receiving "white feathers" from women.

Some of the reserved occupations included clergymen, farmers, doctors, teachers and certain industrial workers such as coal miners, dock workers and train drivers and iron and steel workers. Young workers were not immediately exempt, as, for example, a blacksmith would become exempt at the age of 25, and an unmarried mining or textiles worker would become exempt at the age of 30. Married men had a lower age before they became exempt. By 1915, 1.5 million men were in reserved occupations and by November 1918 this reached 2.5 million men.

== Reserved occupations in the UK in World War II ==
In 1938, a Schedule of Reserved Occupations was created with the goal of exempting skilled workers from being conscripted into service. This idea was drawn up because of lessons learned during World War I when many skilled labourers were drawn into service, which created problems where positions needed filling. Examples of reserved occupations in the Second World War included coal mining, ship building, railway and dockworkers, farmers, teachers, doctors and lighthouse keepers. Not all of these fields were immediately exempt from duty. For example, a lighthouse keeper was exempt from being conscripted from the age of 18, whilst a trade union official was not exempt until he reached 30. Married men in these occupations also had lower exemption ages. The engineering sector had the most reserved occupations.

The idea was constantly reviewed throughout the war, as women, again, began to work more in industries such as munitions. This meant that men were free to join other organisations such as the Special Constabulary, the Home Guard or the ARP. It also allowed for men to join up and give them responsibilities towards the war effort, as well as allowing for them to be less stressed about not being able to directly be involved in the action. Also, many pacifists and conscientious objectors worked in reserved occupations as a compromise or to avoid call-up. Harper Adams Agricultural College saw a huge demand for places during the Second World War, as both agricultural students and farmers were exempt from conscription.

In the UK, coal mining was not a reserved occupation at the start of the war, and there was a great shortage of coal miners. Consequently, starting in December 1943, one in ten men conscripted was chosen at random to work in the mines. These men became known as "Bevin Boys" after the creator of the scheme, Ernest Bevin, the Minister of Labour and National Service.

A schedule of Reserved Occupations also existed in Canada during World War II.

== See also ==
- Gottbegnadeten list: A list of artists and media workers exempted from conscription into the Wehrmacht for their importance to the propaganda system
- Munitions of War Act 1915: A precursor to the reserved occupation list, where no worker could leave his employment without the consent of his employer.
- Confederate Conscription Acts 1862–1864: Measures passed by the Confederate States of America during the American Civil War
  - Twenty Negro Law: A reaction to Lincoln's preliminary Emancipation Proclamation, passed as part of the CSA's Second Conscription Act in 1862
- Selective Service Act of 1917 and Selective Training and Service Act of 1940: United States legislation, which also included exempted professions
- Conscription of yeshiva students: Controversial exemption to conscription in Israel
