= Gugu Mbatha-Raw =

British actress (born 1983)

Gugu Mbatha-Raw MBE
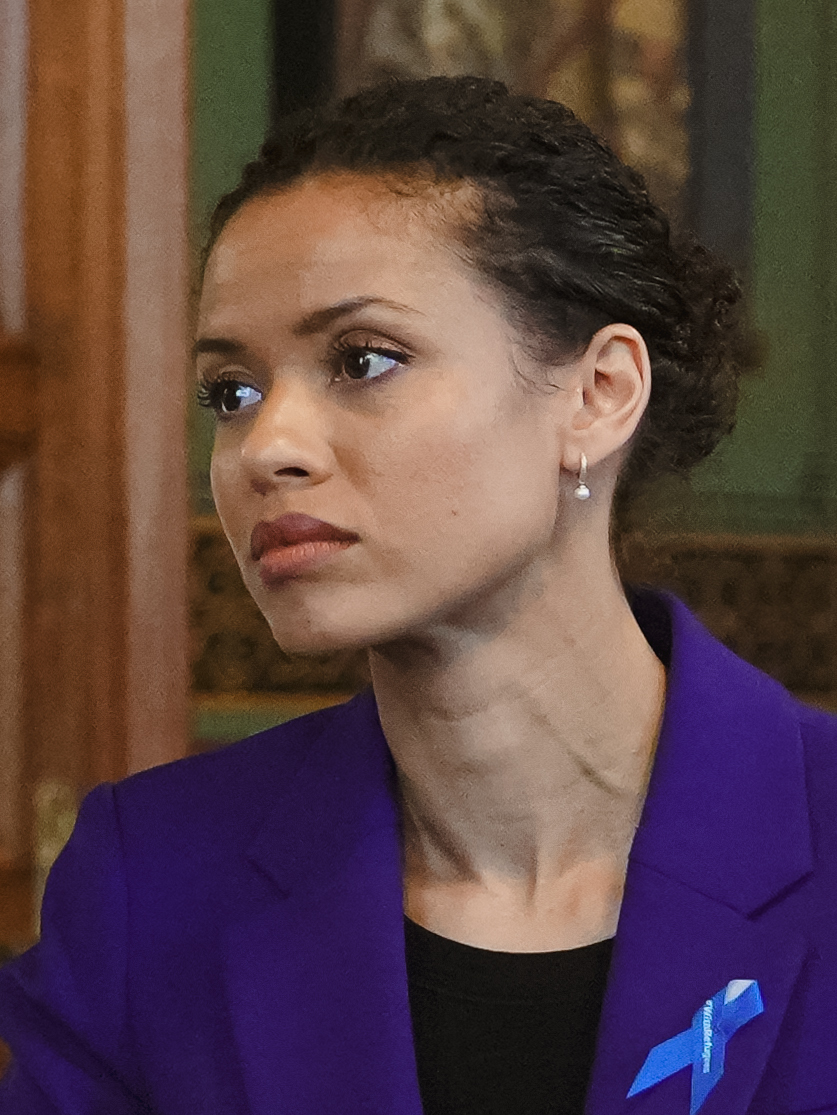
- Mbatha-Raw in 2026
- Born: Gugulethu Sophia Mbatha-Raw; 21 April 1983 (age 43); Oxford, England
- Education: Royal Academy of Dramatic Art (BA)
- Occupation: Actress
- Years active: 2001–present

Gugulethu Sophia Mbatha-Raw MBE (/ˈɡuːɡuː əmˈbætərɔː/; born 21 April 1983) is a British actress. She began acting at the National Youth Music Theatre and the Royal Academy of Dramatic Art, and gained acclaim for her roles as Juliet in Romeo and Juliet and Octavia in Anthony and Cleopatra in 2005 at the Royal Exchange Theatre, Manchester. She made her West End and Broadway debut portraying Ophelia in Hamlet in 2009. For her role as the title character in Jessica Swale's 2015 play Nell Gwynn, she received an Evening Standard Theatre Award nomination.

She took early roles in television acting in Doctor Who (2007), Undercovers (2010), and Touch (2012). She earned acclaim for her leading film roles in Belle (2013), and Beyond the Lights (2014) and took supporting roles in Miss Sloane (2016), Beauty and the Beast (2017), A Wrinkle in Time (2018), Motherless Brooklyn (2019), and Misbehaviour (2020). She took leading roles in the Netflix Black Mirror episode "San Junipero" (2016) and the Apple TV+ drama series Surface (2022–) and acted in The Morning Show (2019), and the Disney+ series Loki (2021–2023).

In 2017, Mbatha-Raw was appointed Member of the Order of the British Empire (MBE) by Queen Elizabeth II for services to drama. In February 2021, Mbatha-Raw was appointed a global Goodwill Ambassador for the United Nations High Commissioner for Refugees (UNHCR).

== Early life ==
Gugulethu Sophia Mbatha-Raw was born on 21 April 1983 in Oxford, the daughter of Patrick Mbatha, a South African doctor, and Anne Raw, an English nurse. Her first name is a contraction of igugu lethu, which means "our treasure" in isiZulu. As a student, her father was a member of the African National Congress and an activist opposing apartheid in South Africa, and had to flee as a result. Her parents separated when she was a year old, and she lived mostly with her mother.

Mbatha-Raw grew up with a love of art, in particular portrait painting and life drawing, and considered becoming an artist instead of an actor. Mbatha-Raw was educated at The Henry Box School, a state comprehensive school in the market town of Witney in Oxfordshire, where she was raised.

Interested in acting, dance, and musical theatre from a young age, she participated in the National Youth Theatre. Her credits include dancing at the Judy Tompsett School of Dance, now known as the Marsh Tompsett School of Dance. In 2001, she moved to London to train at the Royal Academy of Dramatic Art.

== Career ==
=== Early career ===
Mbatha-Raw appeared as Octavia in Antony and Cleopatra in 2005 at the Royal Exchange Theatre, Manchester, and had one of her early dramatic breakthroughs later that year at the Royal Exchange in Romeo and Juliet, in which she starred opposite Andrew Garfield. For that role she was nominated for best actress by the Manchester Evening News Theatre Awards. She next had minor roles on the television series Bad Girls (2006) and Marple (2007) before taking on a recurring role on Doctor Who in 2007. She played Tish Jones, the sister of Martha Jones, companion to the Tenth Doctor, in four episodes, most prominently in "The Lazarus Experiment".

In 2009, Mbatha-Raw was cast as Ophelia in Hamlet on London's West End and Broadway, opposite Jude Law as Prince Hamlet. After seeing her in Hamlet, J. J. Abrams cast her in his 2010 television series Undercovers, which was cancelled after 13 episodes.

In June 2011, Mbatha-Raw was cast as the female lead on the Fox television series Touch, opposite Kiefer Sutherland. She had a supporting role in the romantic comedy Larry Crowne (2011), written and directed by Tom Hanks. She also was named one of 42 "Brits to Watch" by the British Academy of Film and Television Arts.

=== 2013–present ===
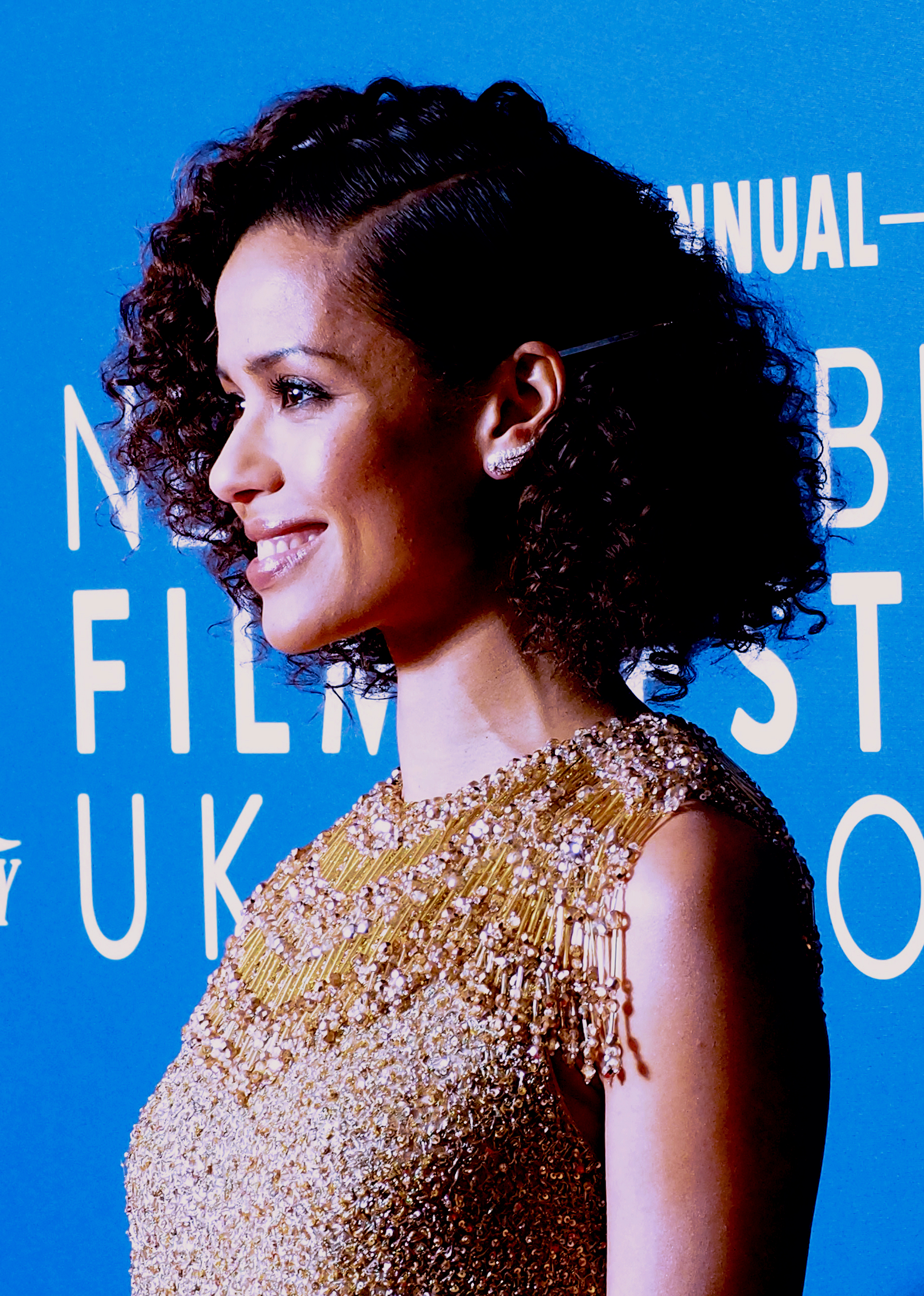
Mbatha-Raw in 2020

Mbatha-Raw garnered praise for her performance in Belle (2013), portraying Dido Elizabeth Belle, a mixed-race woman raised as a gentlewoman in 18th-century England. She won the Best Actress award and was nominated for Most Promising Newcomer at the British Independent Film Awards. She was also nominated for a Satellite Award for Best Actress. In 2014, she spoke at the United Nations headquarters when the film was screened in honor of the International Day of Remembrance of the Victims of Slavery and the Transatlantic Slave Trade. Later that year, Mbatha-Raw starred as a pop singer in the romantic drama Beyond the Lights, for which she earned a Best Actress nomination at the 2014 Gotham Awards.

In 2015, she was nominated for a BAFTA Rising Star Award and had a supporting role in the space opera Jupiter Ascending. She also played Prema Mutiso, the wife of a forensic neuropathologist who first discovered extensive brain damage in NFL players due to concussions, in the biopic Concussion alongside Will Smith. On stage, she portrayed the title role in Jessica Swale's play Nell Gwynn, about the actress who became the mistress of King Charles II of England; it ran at Shakespeare's Globe from 19 September to 17 October 2015. She was nominated for an Evening Standard Theatre Award for Best Actress for her performance.

In 2016, Mbatha-Raw was one of the two leads in "San Junipero", an episode of Black Mirror, and played a major supporting role in Miss Sloane, a drama about Washington lobbyists starring Jessica Chastain. In 2016, she starred opposite Matthew McConaughey in Free State of Jones, a biopic of farmer Newton Knight, a resister of the Confederacy. She played Knight's common-law wife, Rachel, a freedwoman he had a family with after the Civil War.

Mbatha-Raw was appointed a Member of the Order of the British Empire (MBE) in the 2017 Birthday Honours, for services to drama.

In 2017, she played Plumette in the live-action adaptation of Beauty and the Beast, directed by Bill Condon and co-starring Emma Watson and Dan Stevens. In 2018, she starred in a number of science fiction features, including A Wrinkle in Time, directed by Ava DuVernay, and The Cloverfield Paradox.

She played Mary Seacole in a biopic of her life proposed in 2019 by Racing Green Pictures and producer Billy Peterson, intended for release in 2020.

In 2021 and 2023, she played Judge Ravonna Renslayer in the Disney+ series Loki. In 2022 and 2025, she starred in the Apple TV+ psychological thriller series Surface, on which she also served as an executive producer.

In 2021, Mbatha-Raw was appointed a global Goodwill Ambassador for the United Nations High Commissioner for Refugees (UNHCR). Since 2018, she has visited Burundian and Congolese refugees in Rwanda and Uganda as well as taken part in UNHCR's EveryOneCounts and Films of Hope campaigns. In 2021, she was one of the announcers of the Refugee Paralympic team. In November 2021, Mbatha-Raw was cast in the romantic film Nobody's Heart with Edgar Ramírez, directed by Isabel Coixet.

In 2024, she played the female lead in the Netflix action film Lift opposite Kevin Hart. The same year, it was announced that Mbatha-Raw would return to the Doctor Who universe as a new character in the spin-off series The War Between the Land and the Sea.

== Personal life ==
During the COVID-19 pandemic, she painted portraits of George Floyd, Breonna Taylor and others, using painting supplies that her Concussion co-star Will Smith gave her in 2016. She also paints portraits of her costars in film and television. She has stated that her portrait of actor Kevin Hart hangs in his office at his production company.

== Acting credits ==
Key
| † | Denotes films that have not yet been released |

=== Film ===
| Year | Title | Role | Notes |
|---|---|---|---|
| 2007 | Straightheads | Young PA | |
| 2011 | Larry Crowne | Talia | |
| 2013 | Odd Thomas | Viola Peabody | |
| 2013 | Belle | Dido Elizabeth Belle | |
| 2014 | Beyond the Lights | Noni Jean | |
| 2015 | Jupiter Ascending | Famulus | |
| 2015 | Concussion | Prema Mutiso | |
| 2016 | Free State of Jones | Rachel Knight | |
| 2016 | The Whole Truth | Janelle Brady | |
| 2016 | Miss Sloane | Esme Manucharian | |
| 2017 | Beauty and the Beast | Plumette | also voice |
| 2018 | The Cloverfield Paradox | Ava Hamilton | |
| 2018 | Irreplaceable You | Abbie | |
| 2018 | A Wrinkle in Time | Dr. Kate Murry | |
| 2018 | Fast Color | Ruth | |
| 2018 | Farming | Ms. Dapo | |
| 2019 | Motherless Brooklyn | Laura Rose | |
| 2020 | Come Away | Adult Alice | |
| 2020 | Misbehaviour | Jennifer Hosten | |
| 2020 | Summerland | Vera | |
| 2024 | Lift | Abby Gladwell | |
| 2025 | Fuze | Chief Superintendent Zuzana | |
| 2025 | The Woman in Cabin 10 | Rowan | |

=== Television ===
| Year | Title | Role | Notes |
|---|---|---|---|
| 2004 | Holby City | Collette Hill | Episode: "Overload" |
| 2005 | Walk Away and I Stumble | Nurse | Television film |
| 2006 | Vital Signs | Eve | Recurring role; 5 episodes |
| 2006 | Bad Girls | Fidelity Saunders | 2 episodes |
| 2006 | Spooks | Jenny | Guest cast (series 5) |
| 2007 | Doctor Who | Tish Jones | 4 episodes |
| 2007 | Agatha Christie's Marple | Tina Argyle | Episode: "Ordeal by Innocence" |
| 2008 | Lost in Austen | Piranha | 2 episodes |
| 2008 | Bonekickers | Viv Davis | Main role; 6 episodes |
| 2008 | Trial & Retribution | Jenny Miller | Episode: "The Box: Part 1" |
| 2009 | Fallout | Shanice Roberts | Television film |
| 2010, 2012 | Undercovers | Samantha Bloom | Main role; 13 episodes |
| 2012 | Touch | Clea Hopkins | Main role (season 1); 13 episodes |
| 2016, 2019 | Easy | Sophie | 2 episodes |
| 2016 | Black Mirror | Kelly | Episode: "San Junipero" |
| 2019 | The Morning Show | Hannah Shoenfeld | Main role (season 1); 10 episodes |
| 2019 | The Dark Crystal: Age of Resistance | Seladon (voice) | Main role; 9 episodes |
| 2021–2023 | Loki | Judge Ravonna Lexus Renslayer / Rebecca Tourminet | 9 episodes |
| 2021 | The Girl Before | Jane | 4 episodes |
| 2022–present | Surface | Sophie Ellis/Tess Caldwell | Lead role; also executive producer |
| 2025 | The War Between the Land and the Sea | Salt | Lead role; 5 episodes |
| 2026 | Possession | Claudia | Lead role; also executive producer |
| 2026 | Trinity † | Katherine Decker | Lead role |
| TBA | Sutherland † | Mirren | Lead role |

=== Theatre ===
| Year | Title | Role | Venue |
|---|---|---|---|
| 1999 | Into the Woods | Cinderella's Mother (u/s Rapunzel) | National Youth Music Theatre |
| 2005 | Antony and Cleopatra | Iras/Octavia | Royal Exchange in Manchester |
| 2005 | Romeo and Juliet | Juliet Capulet | Royal Exchange in Manchester |
| 2007 | Big White Fog | Wanda Mason | Almeida Theatre, West End |
| 2008 | Gethsemane | Monique | National Theatre |
| 2009–10 | Hamlet | Ophelia | Donmar West End and Broadway |
| 2015 | Nell Gwynn | Nell Gwynn | Shakespeare's Globe |

=== Radio ===
| Year | Title | Role | Notes |
|---|---|---|---|
| 2006 | Living with the Enemy | Sophie/Various | BBC Radio 4 |
| 2009 | Choice of Straws | Michelle | BBC Radio 4 |

== Awards and nominations ==
| Year | Association | Award | Project | Result |
|---|---|---|---|---|
| 2011 | NAACP Image Awards | Outstanding Actress in a Drama Series | Undercovers | Nominated |
| 2012 | Black Reel Awards | Best Breakthrough Performance | Larry Crowne | Nominated |
| 2014 | Miami International Film Festival | SIGNIS Award | Belle | Won |
| 2014 | Chicago International Film Festival | Emerging Artist Award | Beyond the Lights | Won |
| 2014 | British Independent Film Awards | Best Performance by an Actress in a British Independent Film | Belle | Won |
| 2014 | British Independent Film Awards | Best Newcomer | Belle | Nominated |
| 2014 | African-American Film Critics Association | Best Actress | Belle | Won |
| 2014 | Chicago Film Critics Association | Most Promising Performer | Belle | Nominated |
| 2014 | Women's Image Network Awards | Actress in a Feature Film | Belle | Nominated |
| 2014 | Gotham Independent Film Awards | Best Actress | Beyond the Lights | Nominated |
| 2014 | Detroit Film Critics Society | Breakthrough Film Artist | Beyond the Lights | Nominated |
| 2014 | Florida Film Critics Circle | Pauline Kael Breakout Award | Beyond the Lights | 2nd place |
| 2014 | Village Voice Film Poll | Best Actress | Beyond the Lights | 9th place |
| 2014 | Capri Hollywood International Film Festival | Rising Star | Beyond the Lights | Won |
| 2015 | BAFTA Awards | BAFTA Rising Star Award | —N/a | Nominated |
| 2015 | London Film Critics' Circle | British Actress of the Year | Belle | Nominated |
| 2015 | NAACP Image Awards | Outstanding Actress in a Motion Picture | Belle | Nominated |
| 2015 | Satellite Award | Best Actress in a Motion Picture | Belle | Nominated |
| 2015 | Black Reel Awards | Best Actress | Belle | Won |
| 2015 | Black Reel Awards | Best Actress | Beyond the Lights | Nominated |
| 2015 | Georgia Film Critics Association | Breakthrough Awards | Beyond the Lights | Nominated |
| 2015 | Empire Awards | Best Female Newcomer | Belle | Nominated |
| 2015 | Alliance of Women Film Journalists | Best Breakthrough Performance | Belle | Won |
| 2016 | NAACP Image Awards | Outstanding Supporting Actress in a Motion Picture | Concussion | Nominated |
| 2016 | Black Reel Award | Best Supporting Actress | Concussion | Nominated |
| 2017 | Gold Derby Awards | Best Miniseries/TV Movie Supporting Actress | Black Mirror | Nominated |
| 2020 | Black Reel Award | Best Actress | Fast Color | Nominated |
| 2022 | Critics' Choice Super Awards | Best Actress in a Superhero Series | Loki | Nominated |
