= Tap Roots =

1948 film by George Marshall

- Original lobby card
- Directed by: George Marshall
- Written by: Alan Le May; Lionel Wiggam
- Based on: Tap Roots by James H. Street
- Produced by: Walter Wanger
- Starring: Van Heflin; Susan Hayward; Boris Karloff; Julie London
- Cinematography: Winton C. Hoch; Lionel Lindon
- Edited by: Milton Carruth
- Music by: Frank Skinner
- Production company: Walter Wanger Productions
- Distributed by: Universal Pictures
- Release date: August 25, 1948
- Running time: 109 minutes
- Country: United States
- Language: English
- Budget: $2,118,688
- Box office: $3,293,658

Tap Roots is a 1948 Technicolor Western war film set during the American Civil War. It is very loosely based on the true life story of Newton Knight, a farm owner who attempted to secede Jones County from Mississippi.

Made by Walter Wanger Productions and Universal Pictures, it was directed by George Marshall and produced by Walter Wanger from a screenplay by Alan Le May, based on the 1942 novel Tap Roots by James H. Street, with additional dialogue by Lionel Wiggam. The original music was by Frank Skinner and the cinematography by Winton C. Hoch and Lionel Lindon.

The film stars Van Heflin and Susan Hayward with Boris Karloff, Julie London, Whitfield Connor, Ward Bond and Richard Long. Karloff plays a Choctaw Indian.

A radio version of Tap Roots, with Van Heflin, Susan Hayward and Richard Long reprising their film roles, was broadcast by the Lux Radio Theatre on September 27, 1948.

== Plot ==
A poor Mississippi farmer who has never owned slaves finds himself conscripted into the Confederate States Army to fight to defend the right of wealthy slaveowners to be able to maintain their grasp on their black property. After witnessing much deprivation and depravity, he deserts, returns home, and soon finds himself at the head of a band of former slaves, other Confederate deserters, and American Indians who had remained in Mississippi in defiance of the Indian Removal Act, fighting against the Confederacy and its sympathizers.

== Cast ==
- Van Heflin as Keith Alexander
- Susan Hayward as Morna Dabney
- Boris Karloff as Tishomingo
- Julie London as Aven Dabney
- Whitfield Connor as Clay McIvor
- Ward Bond as Hoab Dabney
- Richard Long as Bruce Dabney
- Arthur Shields as Reverend Kirkland
- Griff Barnett as Dr. McIntosh
- Sondra Rodgers as Shellie Dabney
- Ruby Dandridge as Dabby
- Russell Simpson as Big Sam Dabney
- Harry Cording as Leader (uncredited)
- Elmo Lincoln as Sergeant (uncredited)

== Reception ==
Variety wrote that the film earned $2.5 million in rentals in the US.

The film recorded a loss of $380,385.

On November 18, 2023, Universal remastered Tap Roots in 4K, which was premiered for the first time at the Linda Theatre in Akron, Ohio during their 75th anniversary.

== See also ==
- Tishomingo
- Boris Karloff filmography
- List of films and television shows about the American Civil War
- Free State of Jones
