= Rachel Knight =

American slave, wife of Newton Knight

Rachel Knight (1840 – February 11, 1889) was the African-American common-law wife to Newton Knight (1829–1922). In 1881 she was baptized into the Church of Jesus Christ of Latter-day Saints. She was depicted by Gugu Mbatha-Raw in Gary Ross' 2016 feature film Free State of Jones.

== Life ==
=== Early life ===
Rachel Knight was born into slavery to parents named Abraham and Viney in 1840 in Georgia. She was described as a 'Guinea Negro', "meaning she was racially mixed but did not look white nor was she light-skinned, but with 'nice hair' not kinky and shoulder length" similar to Australian aborigines. She was sixteen years of age when she was purchased by John "Jackie" Knight, one of "Jones County's largest slaveholders" in 1856. By this time she had given birth to two children, Rosetta and George Ann, whose father is unknown. In 1858 she gave birth to a son named Jeffrey who was fathered by Jesse Davis Knight, John "Jackie" Knight's son. In 1861, Jesse Davis Knight inherited Rachel as a part of his father's will, and by 1863 he fathered two more children with her, Edward in 1861 and Francis "Fanny" in 1863.

=== Newton Knight and the Free State of Jones ===
Not much is known about the details of Rachel's life. Towards the end of the American Civil War, she helped Newton Knight, grandson of John "Jackie" Knight, evade capture by Confederate forces after his desertion from the army. Newton's story was portrayed in the 2016 film Free State of Jones where Newton was portrayed by Matthew McConaughey and Rachel was depicted by Gugu Mbatha-Raw. While Newton was initially married to Serena Turner, he eventually was separated from her and married Rachel. Together Newton and Rachel had two children, Martha Ann in 1865 and John Stewart in 1868.

=== Rachel's Membership in the Church of Jesus Christ of Later-day Saints ===
The Church of Jesus Christ of Latter-day Saints began proselytizing in the American South, Jones county in particular in the early 1880s. Rachel was baptized a member of the Church of Jesus Christ of Latter-day Saints on February 2, 1881, by Elam Wells McBride and was confirmed by William Thompson Jr. Her daughter Martha Ann was also baptized in 1882 and John Stewart was baptized nine years later in 1891. Knight family researcher Kenneth Welch claims "Rachel traveled out to Utah but came back to Mississippi because it was too cold."

=== Later life ===
According to United States census data, Rachel remained in Jasper County, Mississippi with Newton until her death in 1889. According to family members "she died from having too many babies too close together", as she had delivered a child every two years from the time she was fourteen. Rachel was buried in the Knight family cemetery-one of the few interracial cemeteries in the state-and Newton would later be buried beside her.

== Legacy ==
The Knight family mothered by Rachel grew to have a reputation as the "white Negroes" of Mississippi due to their light skin color and straight hair. As most of Rachel's later descendants were white passing, they fled to other states to start new lives in the 1920s and 1930s, enjoying opportunities that were unavailable to African Americans at the time .

=== Davis Knight ===
Rachel's great-grandson, Davis Knight, married Junie Lee Spradley, a white woman, in 1946. Two years later Davis was charged with violating the Mississippi state constitution that stated "the marriage of a white person with a negro or mulatto, or person who shall have one-eighth or more of negro blood, shall be unlawful and void." During his trial, Davis asserted to the court that he was white as "his wife believed him to be white and his Navy service records listed him as white." Initially the court proclaimed that because his great-grandmother, Rachel, was considered "a negro" that implicated Davis at least one-eighth Black and, therefore, was in violation of the law. This is an example of Mississippi's "one drop rule" which states that if an individual has any Black or African ancestry, they will be considered legally Black. He was sentenced to five years in prison. In 1949, Davis appealed his case and "the Supreme Court of Mississippi reversed his conviction." The Mississippi state laws against interracial marriage were nullified by the United States Supreme Court when it passed Loving v. Virginia in 1967 and formally repealed in the 1980s.
