= Chockerup Inn =

Former coaching inn on a mail route in Western Australia

General information
- Type: Inn, hotel
- Country: Australia
- Coordinates: 34°50′04″S 117°44′27″E
- Opened: 1854
- Closed: 1889

Chockerup Inn (also known as Chorkerup Inn) was a roadside inn on the mail coach route between Albany and Mount Barker, Western Australia, that was built in 1854 and closed in 1889 when the Great Southern Railway opened.

== Establishment ==
The inn was established as a simple wattle-and-daub hut in 1854, when the mail route between Albany and Perth began running. The mail coach was drawn by horses, and Chockerup Inn was the first place to change horses or have a meal after leaving Albany, being a couple of hours journey (around 15 miles) from the port town.

== 1870s ==
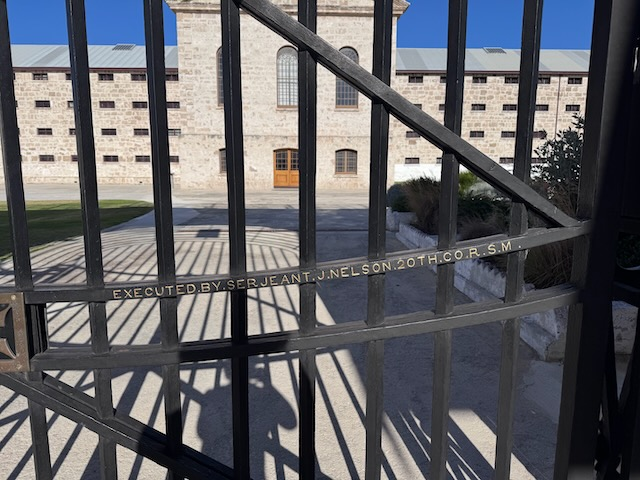
One of the landlords of Chockerup was Joseph Nelson, whose name is inscribed in gilt letters on the gate at Fremantle Prison.

In the 1870s, Joseph Nelson, one of the Royal Sappers and Miners who had come to Fremantle in 1851 to help build Fremantle Prison and other public works, took over Chockerup Inn. He was a blacksmith who had led in the construction of the iron gates at Fremantle Prison in 1855, and it would have been useful to have a blacksmith on the road to help with shoeing horses and repairing coaches and wagons.

== 1880s ==
In 1884 James and Emma Gorman took over, and they ran the inn until it closed in 1889, when the railway opened and travellers stopped passing by Chockerup. The inn thrived in this period, with many visitors, and Emma Gorman provided people with generous meals at any time of day, as reported both in the local newspaper and by visiting dignitaries like the Lady Brassey, a best-selling travel author of the time. Lord Brassey noted that they gave the horses a feed at Chockerup Inn.

== After closing ==
After the railway opened in 1889, Chockerup Inn was abandoned due to lack of traffic. By 1928 only a few bricks remained.
