= Twenty Negro Law =

American Civil War Confederate legislation

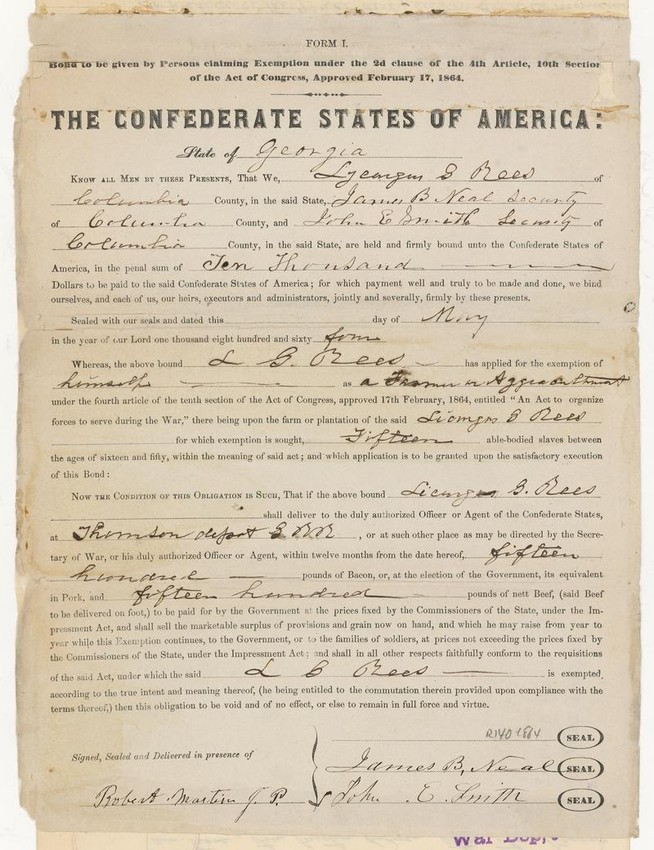
Exemption granted to Lycurgus Rees of Georgia in May 1864, pursuant to terms of the so-called "Twenty Negro Law." By the time this exemption was granted, the number of slaves necessary to qualify had been reduced from 20 to 15.

The "Twenty Negro Law", also known as the "Twenty Slave Law" and the "Twenty Nigger Law", was a piece of legislation enacted by the Confederate Congress during the American Civil War. The law specifically exempted from Confederate military service one white man for every twenty slaves owned on a Confederate plantation, or for two or more plantations within five miles of each other that collectively had twenty or more slaves. Passed as part of the Second Conscription Act in 1862, the law was a reaction to United States President Abraham Lincoln's preliminary Emancipation Proclamation, which was issued just 19 days earlier. The law addressed Confederate fears of a slave rebellion due to so many white men being absent from home, as they were fighting in the Confederate Army. The Confederacy enacted the first conscription laws in United States history, and the percentage of Confederate soldiers who were conscripts was nearly double that of Union soldiers.

== Background ==
By the spring of 1862, the Confederate Army was facing the prospect of a severe manpower shortage, since the twelve-month terms of most initial enlistees were expiring, and far fewer men were re-enlisting than had been hoped for. The First Conscription Act, passed by the Confederate Congress in April 1862, attempted to address this problem by making all white Southern men between 18 and 35 liable for compulsory military service. Though the South exempted several categories of men in occupations related to transportation, communications, the ministry, teaching and medicine, it did not exempt overseers. This left many plantations entirely in the charge of white women, elderly white men, or minors; these were not seen as being particularly able to maintain slave discipline, or to react effectively to prevent or suppress any unrest.

The Conscription Act proved extremely unpopular with many Confederate soldiers. Sam Watkins, a private in Company H, 1st Tennessee Infantry, wrote about his reaction and those of several of his service mates to this new law, in his book Company Aytch:

Soldiers had enlisted for twelve months only, and had faithfully complied with their volunteer obligations; the terms for which they had enlisted had expired, and they naturally looked upon it that they had a right to go home. They had done their duty faithfully and well. They wanted to see their families; in fact, wanted to go home anyhow. War had become a reality; they were tired of it. A law had been passed by the Confederate States Congress called the conscript act. A soldier had no right to volunteer and to choose the branch of service he preferred. He was conscripted. From this time on till the end of the war, a soldier was simply a machine, a conscript. It was mighty rough on rebels. We cursed the war, we cursed Bragg, we cursed the Southern Confederacy. All our pride and valor had gone, and we were sick of war and the Southern Confederacy.

== Enactment of the law ==
When Abraham Lincoln issued his Emancipation Proclamation on September 22, 1862, many in the Confederacy (and in the North, including George McClellan) believed that the Union president was specifically trying to foment a slave rebellion. Partly to address this concern, and partly to address other issues related to the First Conscription Act, the Confederate Congress passed its Second Conscription Act on October 11, 1862, which included a provision that read:

To secure the proper police of the country, one person, either as agent, owner or overseer on each plantation on which one white person is required to be kept by the laws or ordinances of any State, and on which there is no white male adult not liable to do military service, and in States having no such law, one person as agent, owner or overseer, on each plantation of twenty negroes, and on which there is no white male adult not liable to military service; And furthermore, For additional police for every twenty negroes on two or more plantations, within five miles of each other, and each having less than twenty negroes, and of which there is no white male adult not liable to military duty, one person, being the oldest of the owners or overseers on such plantations;… are hereby exempted from military service in the armies of the Confederate States;… Provided, further, That the exemptions herein above enumerated and granted hereby, shall only continue whilst the persons exempted are actually engaged in their respective pursuits or occupations.

While this new provision provoked little criticism in some areas of the Confederacy, such as Virginia, it proved extremely unpopular with much of the rank-and-file soldiery in the Confederate Army. Sam Watkins writes of his own feelings toward this particular provision:

A law was made by the Confederate States Congress about this time allowing every person who owned twenty negroes to go home. It gave us the blues; we wanted twenty negroes. Negro property suddenly became very valuable, and there was raised the howl of "rich man's war, poor man's fight." The glory of the war, the glory of the South, the glory and the pride of our volunteers had no charms for the conscript.

According to historian Eric Foner:

The impression that planters were not bearing their fair share of the war’s burdens spread quickly in the upcountry. Committed to Southern independence, most planters were also devoted to the survival of plantation slavery, and when these goals clashed, the latter often took precedence.

— Eric Foner, "The South's Inner Civil War" (March 1989), American Heritage.

In spite of the great displeasure the law caused, few men actually were affected by the law. For example, out of the roughly 38,000 overseers living in the South in 1860, 200 in Virginia, 120 in North Carolina, 201 in Georgia, and 300 in South Carolina won exemptions.

== Later developments ==
Partly in response to such criticism, the Confederate Congress amended the Second Conscription Act in May 1863, requiring among other things that any person exempted under the so-called "Twenty Negro Law" had to have been an overseer prior to April 16, 1862, on plantations that had not been divided after October 11, 1862 (as some plantation owners had been dividing their holdings so as to exempt more overseers). Furthermore, only plantations under the control of a minor, a single woman, a person of unsound mind, or a person who was serving in the Confederate military could qualify, and a $500 fee was required to process the application. The Third Conscription Act of February 1864 dropped the number of slaves from 20 to 15, but in turn required the person so exempted to sell to the Confederacy at government-set prices one hundred pounds of bacon and/or beef for each slave, with the surplus to be sold to soldiers' families, also at government prices.

With the defeat of the Confederacy in 1865, the "Twenty Negro Law" ceased to exist.

== See also ==
- Confederate Conscription Acts 1862–1864
- Quotations related to American Civil War at Wikiquote
- Quotations related to Confederate States of America at Wikiquote
- Quotations related to Slavery at Wikiquote
