= Mississippi in the American Civil War =

Coordinates: 33°N 90°W

Mississippi
- Nickname(s): "The Magnolia State"
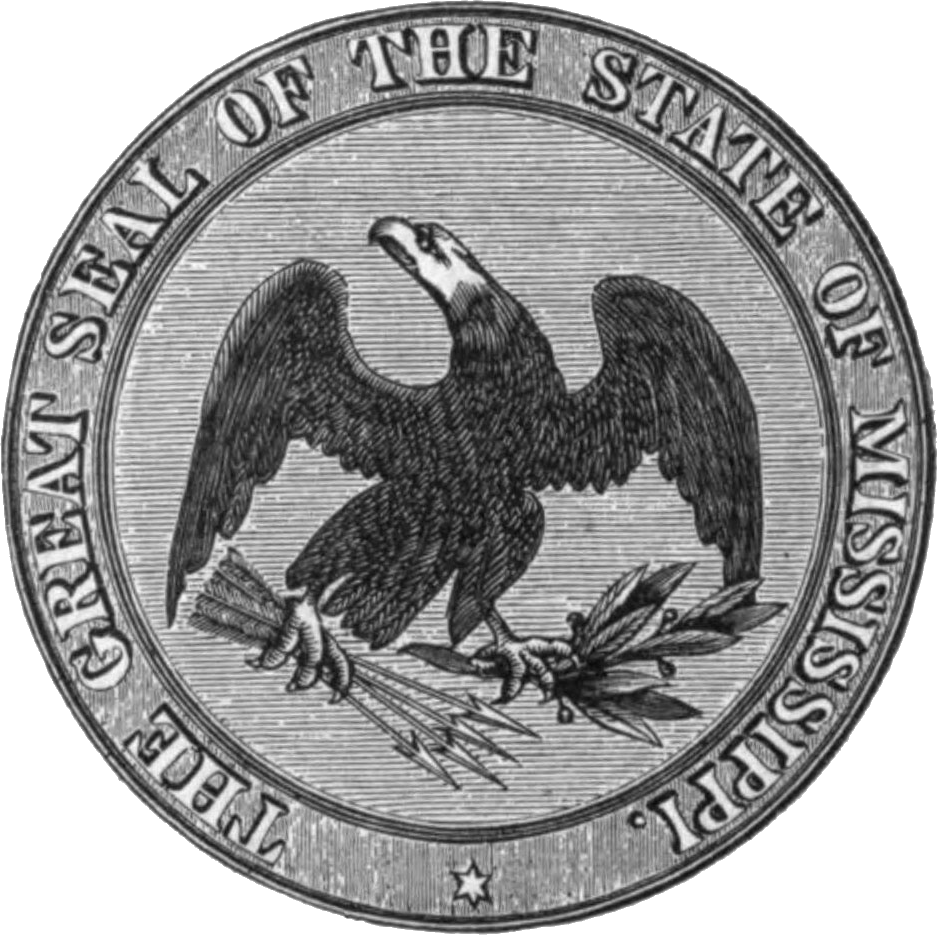
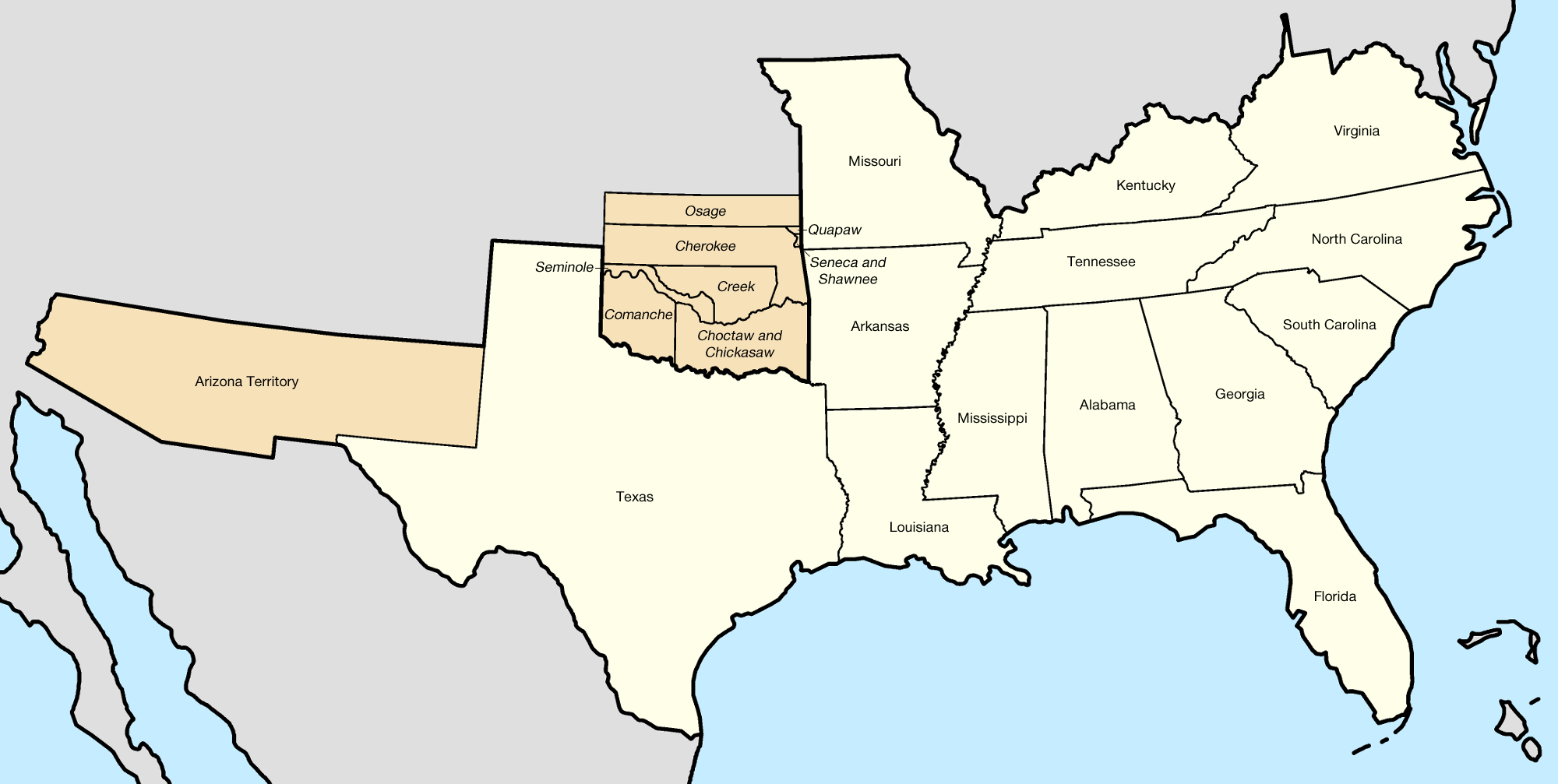
- Flag Seal Map of the Confederate States
- Capital: Jackson
- Largest city: Natchez
- Admitted to the Confederacy: March 29, 1861 (5th)
- Population: 791,305 total; • 354,674 (44.82%) free; • 436,631 (55.18%) slave
- Forces supplied: - Confederate Troops: 80,000; Union Troops: 17,545 (17,000 black; 545 white) total
- Major garrisons/armories: Corinth
- Governor: 1859–1863 John J. Pettus; 1863–1865 Charles Clark
- Senators: 1862–1865 Albert G. Brown; 1862–1864 James Phelan; 1864–1865 John W. C. Watson
- Representatives: List
- Restored to the Union: February 23, 1870

Mississippi was the second southern state to declare its secession from the United States, doing so on January 9, 1861. It joined with six other southern states to form the Confederacy on February 4, 1861. Mississippi's location along the lengthy Mississippi River made it strategically important to both the Union and the Confederacy; dozens of battles were fought in the state as armies repeatedly clashed near key towns and transportation nodes.

Mississippian troops fought in every major theater of the American Civil War, although most were concentrated in the Western Theater. Confederate president Jefferson Davis was a Mississippi politician and operated a large cotton plantation there. Prominent Mississippian generals during the war included William Barksdale, Carnot Posey, Wirt Adams, Earl Van Dorn, Robert Lowry, and Benjamin G. Humphreys.

== Secession ==
As sectional tensions grew in the 1850s, the Whig party's support in Mississippi collapsed and Southern Democrats began to take a hard line against any federal measures to restrict the expansion of slavery, to the point of openly discussing secession from the United States and the formation of a Southern Confederacy. During the 1860 presidential election, the state supported Southern Democrat candidate John C. Breckinridge, giving him 40,768 votes (59.0% of the total of 69,095 ballots cast). John Bell, the candidate of the Constitutional Union Party, came in a distant second with 25,045 votes (36.25% of the total), with Stephen A. Douglas, a northern Democrat, receiving 3,282 votes (4.75%). Abraham Lincoln, the Republican candidate who won the national election, was not on the ballot in Mississippi. According to one Mississippian newspaper in the late 1850s:

The slavery controversy in the United States presents a case of the most violent antagonism of interests and opinions. No persuasions, no entreaties or appeals, can allay the fierce contention between the two ...

— Mississippi Free Trader, August 28, 1857.

Following the election of Lincoln, Mississippi convened a state secession convention in January 1861, and voted to leave the Union on January 9. The state then joined the Confederacy less than a month later, issuing an ordinance of secession listing their reasons for seceding, which proclaimed that "[o]ur position is thoroughly identified with the institution of slavery--the greatest material interest of the world".

Fulton Anderson, a Mississippian lawyer, delivered a speech to the Virginian secession convention in 1861, in which he declared that "grievances of the Southern people on the slavery question" and their opposition to the Republican Party's goal of "the ultimate extinction of slavery" were the primary catalysts of the state in declaring secession.

Along with South Carolina, Mississippi was one of only two states in the Union in 1860 in which the majority of the state's population were slaves. According to Jefferson Davis, Democratic US senator from Mississippi and future Confederate President, Mississippi joined the Confederacy because it "has heard proclaimed the theory that all men are created free and equal", a sentiment perceived as being threatening to slavery, and because the "Declaration of Independence has been invoked to maintain the position of the equality of the races", a position that Davis was opposed to.

== Military enlistment ==
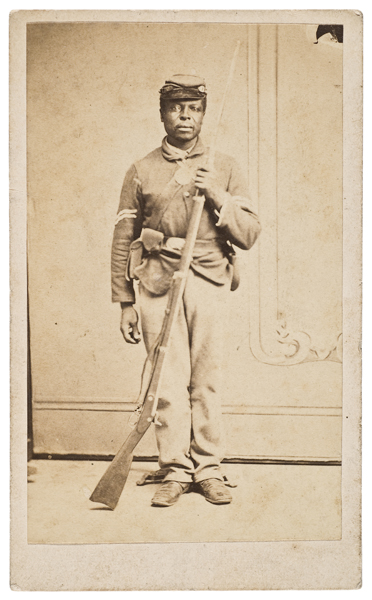
Tom Dare, African-American Mississippi soldier of the Union 58th Colored Infantry

The vast majority of white Mississippians supported slavery and the Confederate cause, and thousands volunteered to join the Confederate military. Around 80,000 white Mississippians served in the Confederate Army, supplying 45 infantry regiments, 18 cavalry regiments, multiple artillery batteries, and numerous smaller organizations. Twelve of the infantry regiments and two of the artillery batteries served in the Eastern theater as part of the Army of Northern Virginia under General Robert E. Lee, the remainder of the Mississippi infantry and artillery troops, along with all of the Mississippi cavalry units fought in the Western Theater as part of the Army of Tennessee led by Generals Braxton Bragg, Joseph E. Johnston, Nathan Bedford Forrest and John Bell Hood. Initially the Confederate armies were filled by volunteers, until Confederate conscription came into effect in 1862, making white men age 18-35 eligible for the draft. Various exemptions applied, but as time went on these were limited and the age range was expanded as well, with men age 17-50 eligible for conscription by the war's end. According to one historian's analysis, approximately one third of Mississippi's Confederate soldiers died during the course of the conflict.

There were regional variations in enthusiasm for Confederate service. The likelihood of a man volunteering for service increased with a person's amount of personal property owned, including slaves. Poor men were less likely to volunteer. Men living near the Mississippi River, regardless of their wealth or other characteristics, were less likely to join the army than were those living in the state's interior. Many military-age men in these western counties had moved elsewhere. Union control of the Mississippi River made its neighbors especially vulnerable, and river-county residents apparently left their communities (and often the Confederacy) rather than face invasion.

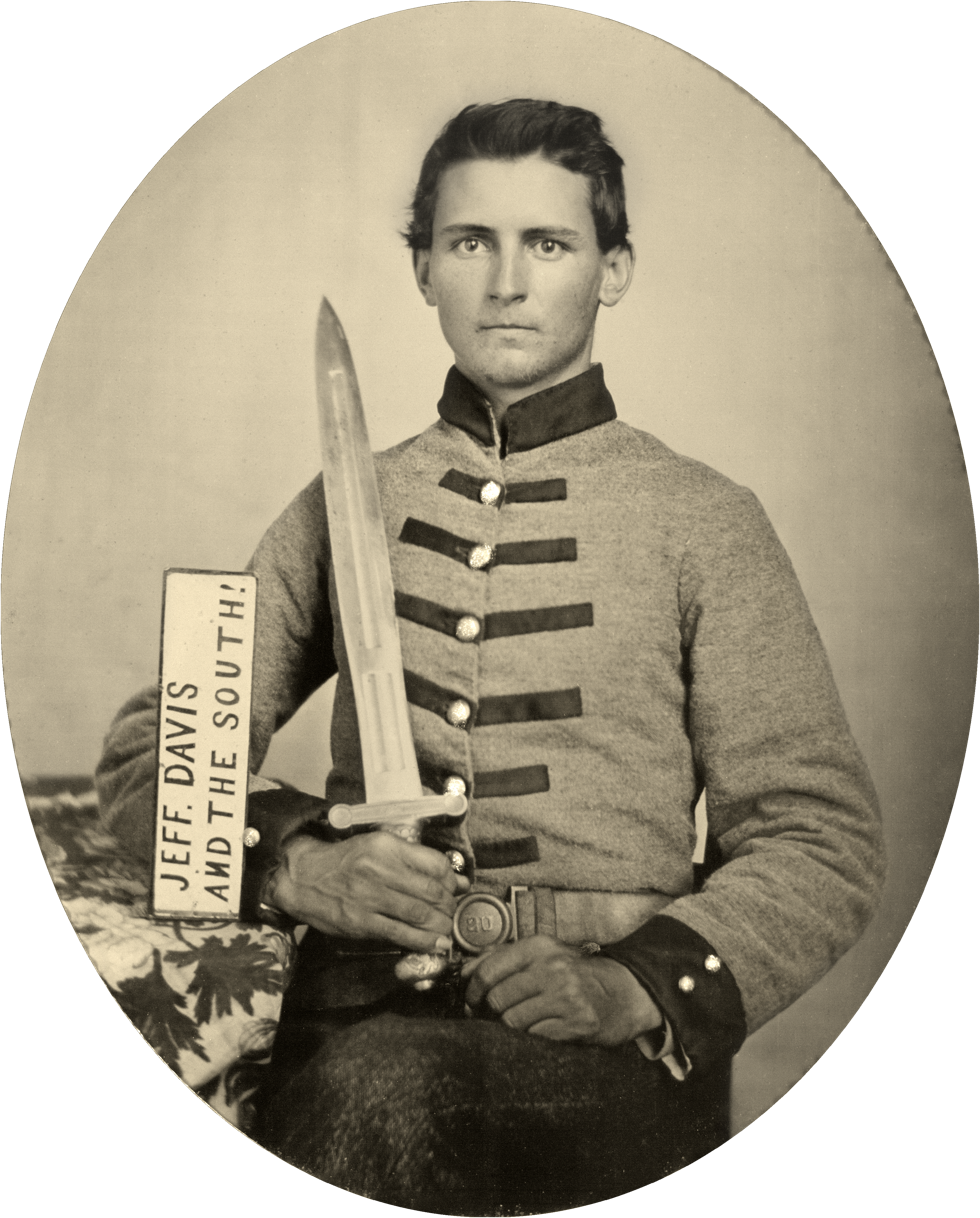
Henry Augustus Moore, Confederate soldier of the 15th Mississippi Infantry.

In addition to regular Confederate forces, many men served in the Mississippi State Troops, formed in 1862 from the pre-war state militia. The State Troops were under the Governor's direct control, although by law they could take orders from Confederate officers. Poorly organized and managed ineffectively, the State Troops suffered from a lack of discipline and high rates of absenteeism, with many men only joining to avoid being drafted into the regular army. Most of the State Troops cavalry units were mustered into Confederate service in 1864 as part of Forrest's Cavalry Corps.

As the war progressed, a considerable number enslaved men escaped or were freed by advancing Union troops. Initially barred from military service, the United States Colored Troops was formed on May 22, 1863 to allow African-American men to enlist in the Union army. More than 17,000 Mississippian former slaves fought for the Union. Black soldiers died at a higher rate than their white counterparts, and many Black Mississippi troops distinguished themselves in military service, such as Wilson Brown, a US Navy sailor born as a slave in Natchez who won the Medal of Honor for bravery. An unknown number of enslaved men in Mississippi performed forced labor on behalf of the Confederate government, building fortifications and acting as servants for Confederate officers.

The number of white troops contributed by the state to the Union cause was among the lowest of the slave-holding states, although as the war progressed many Confederate troops deserted and expressed pro-Union sentiments. 545 white Mississippians joined the Union Army, with only a single unit of white Mississippi troops, the 1st Battalion, Mississippi Mounted Rifles formed for service during the war.

== Government and politics ==
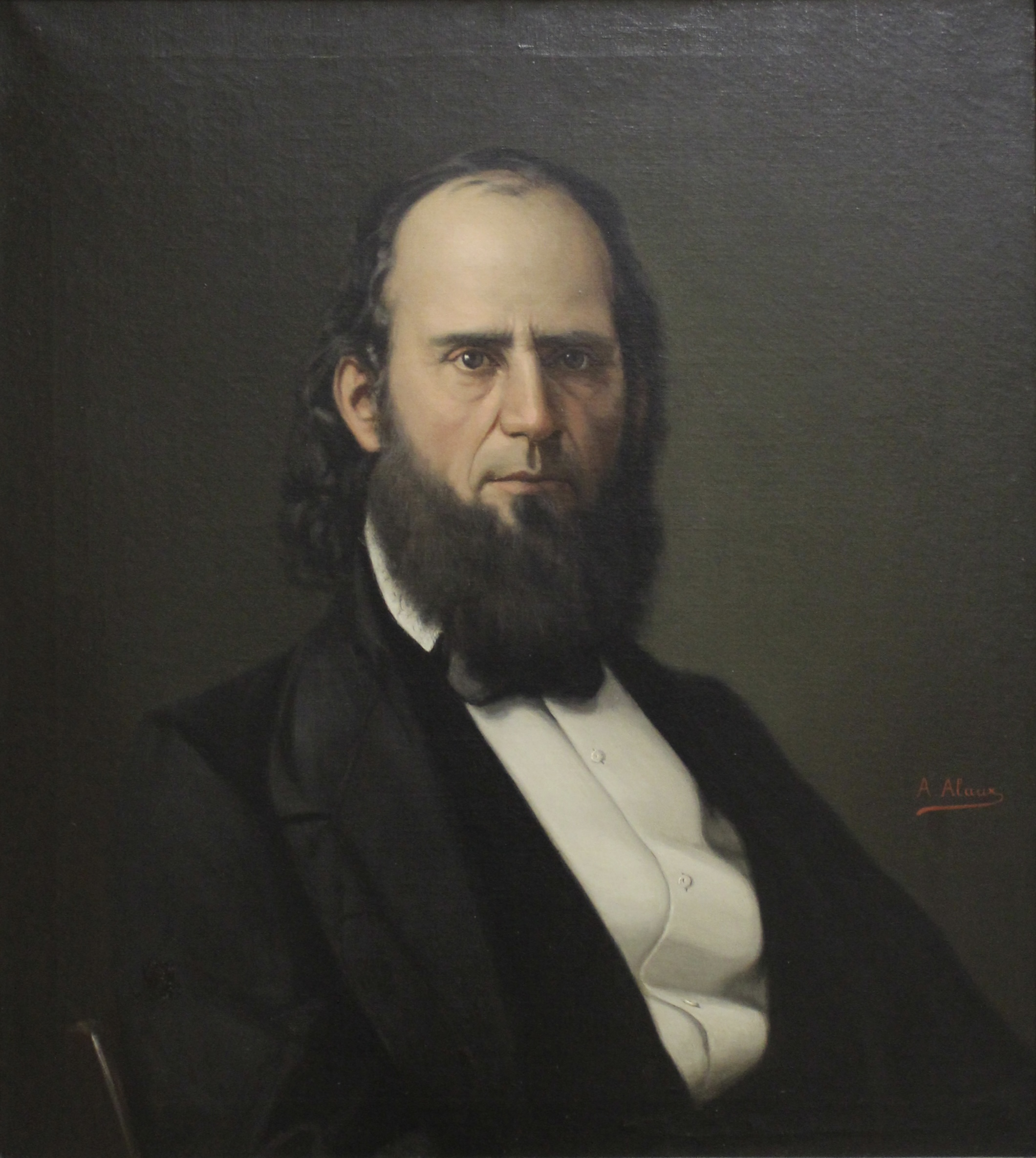
Governor John J. Pettus, the "Mississippi Fire-eater" who led his state to secede in 1861.

Mississippi Governor John J. Pettus, elected in 1859, was a member of the extreme pro-secession faction, known as the "Fire-Eaters". In his inaugural address, Governor Pettus said that the South's only way to maintain slavery was secession, and he pledged to defend the "superiority and supremacy of the white race" against "Black Republicans".

Mississippi's entire Congressional delegation at the time of secession were pro-slavery Democrats, including figures of national prominence such as Senator Jefferson Davis, Senator Albert G. Brown, and US Representative William Barksdale. Mississippi's representatives and senators all withdrew from the US Congress in January 1861, following Mississippi's secession, and many of them took up positions in the Confederate Army or stood for election to the Confederate States Congress.

A formal two-party system did not have time to develop in the Confederacy. Nevertheless, a pro-administration faction supportive of Confederate President Jefferson Davis, and an anti-administration faction (often made up of former Whigs) emerged during Congressional debates. Following the 1863 Confederate States House of Representatives elections, more anti-administration members were elected to the Confederate Congress, including Mississippi representatives Jehu Amaziah Orr and John Tillman Lamkin who consistently voted against the administration's policies, giving voice to those who were discontented with the war.

As an example of Herrenvolk democracy, only white men in Mississippi were eligible to vote. Despite the impact of war, state and national elections were held consistently and the state legislature continued to function throughout the Civil War period. After the state capital of Jackson was burned in 1863, the legislature continued to meet at Columbus and Macon.

Governor Pettus was prevented by term limits for running for reelection in the 1863 Mississippi gubernatorial election, and a three-way contest was held between the conservative General Charles Clark, former Whig Absolom M. West, and fire-eater Reuben Davis. Clark won by a wide margin, indicating a weariness with the type of extremist bravado that had led Mississippi out of the Union in 1861, but Clark was not a peace advocate, stating in his inaugural speech that his war-ravaged state "yet has ample resources both in men and means" to continue the fight. Clark remained in office until May 22, 1865, when he was removed by US troops and imprisoned.

== Emancipation of slaves ==
As soon as Union troops arrived in Mississippi, enslaved people began seeking safety and freedom by fleeing towards Union-held areas. Portions of northwestern Mississippi were under Union control on January 1, 1863, when the Emancipation Proclamation went into effect. All of Mississippi had been declared "in rebellion" in the Proclamation, and Union forces accordingly began to free slaves in the U.S.-controlled areas of Mississippi at once. By war's end, approximately one-third to one-half of Mississippi's 436,000 enslaved people had already been freed.

According to one Confederate lieutenant from Mississippi, slavery was the cause for which the state declared secession from the Union, saying that "This country without slave labor would be completely worthless ... We can only live & exist by that species of labor: and hence I am willing to fight to the last."

== Unionism, desertion, & discontent ==
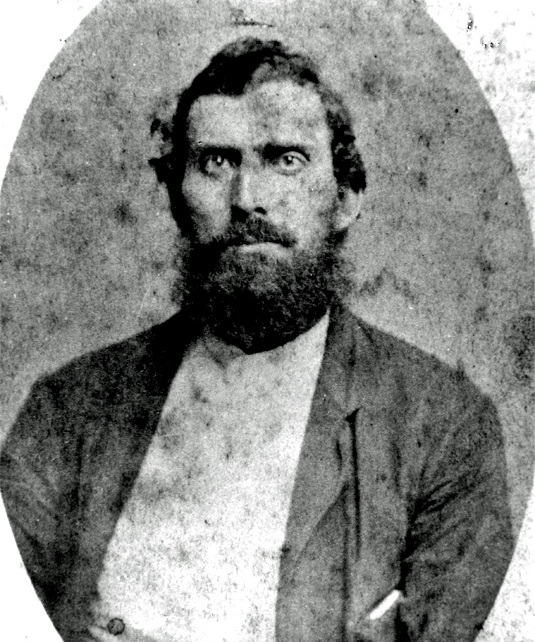
Newton Knight, a Unionist deserter who led an anti-Confederate guerilla war in Jones County.

Not all white Mississippians were eager advocates of secession, and during the election of members of the state secession convention in January 1861, a sizeable number of delegates were sent to represent Unionist voices. Pro-unionists came from poorer counties where a smaller proportion of the white population owned slaves, and also from slaveholding counties with massive plantations, where the richest plantation owners feared (correctly) that war would put their lands and holdings of human chattel at risk.

Following major Southern defeats, many soldiers became disenchanted with the prospects of the Confederacy, and the passage of the Twenty Negro Law that exempted rich slaveholders from military service convinced many poorer soldiers that the conflict had become "a rich man's war and poor man's fight". In 1863 following the fall of Vicksburg to Union forces, desertion became a major problem for Confederate forces in Mississippi. Thousands of Mississippi troops abandoned their posts, returning to their home regions and forming armed bands for mutual aid and self-defense, often aided by women and enslaved people. Many deserters were simply concerned with survival and supporting their families as economic conditions worsened, others turned against the Confederacy and actively sought to support the Union cause, and some were simply bandits who preyed on the civilian population.

The most well known deserter-turned-guerilla was Newton Knight, who led a band of former Confederate soldiers in Jones County in what has been called the Confederacy's "inner civil war". Knight and his group of deserters assassinated Confederate officers, raided supply depots, and overthrew civil authority in Jones County and the surrounding areas. Confederate troops were sent to capture him in 1864, and some of Knight's men were killed in skirmishes or executed by Confederate forces, but Knight himself eluded capture and was active in post-war Republican politics.

Though the "free state of Jones" was the most famous center of anti-Confederate resistance, by 1864 the government had lost control of large regions of the state. In the south-central region Covington, Greene, Jasper, Lawrence, Leake, Marion, Perry, Simpson, and Smith counties, in North Mississippi Itawamba, Monroe, Tippah, and Tishomingo counties, and in the central region Choctaw, Kemper, Neshoba, Newton, Rankin, and Winston counties were all severely affected by armed gangs of deserters who challenged Confederate authority, robbed civilians, and killed or threatened government and military officials.

== Mississippian towns during the war ==
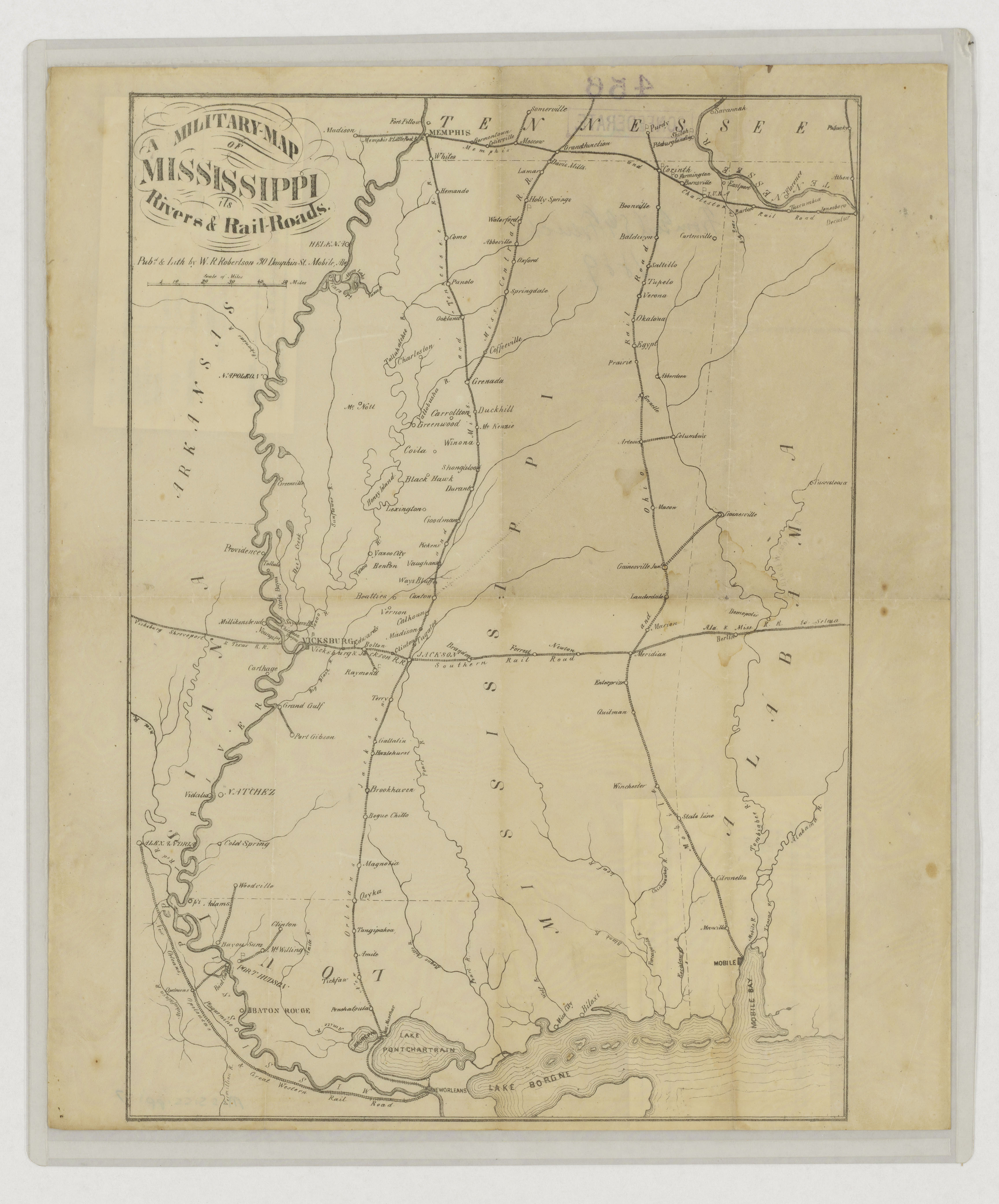
"Military Map of Mississippi by W.R. Robertson" showing Grenada (Confederate Maps collection, U.S. War Dept.)

=== Corinth ===
Corinth's location at the junction of two railroads made it strategically important. Confederate General P.G.T. Beauregard retreated there after the Battle of Shiloh, pursued by Union Maj. Gen. Henry W. Halleck. Beauregard abandoned the town when Halleck approached, letting it fall into Union hands. Since Halleck approached so cautiously, digging entrenchments at every stop for over a month, this action has been known as the Siege of Corinth.

Maj. Gen. William Rosecrans moved to Corinth as well and concentrated his force with Halleck later in the year to again attack the city. The Battle of Corinth took place on October 3–4, 1862, when Confederate Maj. Gen. Earl Van Dorn attempted to retake the city. The Confederate troops won back the city but were quickly forced out when Union reinforcements arrived.

Oxford

On August 22, 1864, the city of Oxford, MS was burned to the ground by General A.J. Smith. Only the University of Mississippi and two shops were left standing. This action was taken because Nathan Bedford Forrest had taken refuge in Oxford.

=== Jackson ===
Despite its small population, Jackson became a strategic center of manufacturing for the Confederacy. In 1863, during the campaign which ended in the capture of Vicksburg, Union forces captured Jackson during two battles—once before the fall of Vicksburg and again soon after its fall.

On May 13, 1863, Union forces won the first Battle of Jackson, forcing Confederate forces to flee northward towards Canton. Subsequently, on May 15 Union troops under William Tecumseh Sherman burned and looted key facilities in Jackson. After driving the Confederates out of Jackson, Union forces turned west once again and soon placed Vicksburg under siege. Confederates began to reassemble in Jackson in preparation for an attempt to break through the Union lines now surrounding Vicksburg. Confederates marched out of Jackson to break the siege in early July. However, unknown to them, Vicksburg had already surrendered on July 4. Union Army general Ulysses S. Grant dispatched Sherman to meet the Confederate forces. Upon learning that Vicksburg had already surrendered, the Confederates retreated back into Jackson, thus beginning the Siege of Jackson, which lasted for approximately one week before the town fell.

=== Edwards ===
During the height of the Civil War on May 17, 1863, Confederate soldiers retreated via a nearby property known as "Askew's Landing" after suffering defeat at the Battle of Champion Hill. They hastily utilized Askew's Ferry to cross the river, setting it ablaze thereafter to hinder the pursuit of the Union Army. As recounted by LegendsofAmerica.com, skirmishes broke out at the Bridgepoint Plantation involving parts of Lieutenant General John C. Pemberton's 4th Brigade under the command of Colonel Alex W. Reynolds. These forces were pursued by the 15th Corps of General Ulysses S. Grant's army, led by General William T. Sherman. Later, in June of the same year, the plantation again became the scene of a similar skirmish. The site of this battle is currently open to the public via a campground named Askew's Landing RV Campground. The campground boasts an original barn and camp store that were original to the plantation and hosts various Civil War groups throughout the year.

=== Natchez ===
During the American Civil War, the Mississippian city of Natchez remained largely undamaged. The city surrendered to Flag-Officer David G. Farragut after the fall of New Orleans in May 1862. One civilian, an elderly man, was killed during the war, when in September 1863, a Union ironclad shelled the town from the river and he promptly died of a heart attack. Union soldiers sent by Ulysses S. Grant from Vicksburg occupied Natchez in 1863. The local commander, General Thomas Ransom, established headquarters at a home called Rosalie.

Ellen Shields's memoir reveals a Confederate woman's reactions to Union occupation of the city. Shields was a member of the local elite and her memoir points to the upheaval of Confederate society during the war. According to historian Joyce Broussard, Shields's memoir indicates that Confederate men, absent because of the war, were seen to have failed in their homes and in the wider community, forcing the women to use their class-based femininity and their sexuality to deal with the Union Army.

The 340 planters who each owned 250 or more slaves in the Natchez region in 1860 were not enthusiastic Confederates. The support these slaveholders had for the Confederacy was problematic because they were fairly recent arrivals to the Confederacy, opposed secession, and held social and economic ties to the Union. These elite planters also lacked a strong emotional attachment to the idea of a Southern nation; however, when the war started, many of their sons and nephews joined the Confederate army. On the other hand, Charles Dahlgren arrived from Philadelphia and made his fortune before the war. He did support the Confederacy and led a brigade, but was sharply criticized for failing to defend the Gulf Coast. When the Union Army came he moved to Georgia for the duration. He returned in 1865 but never recouped his fortune; He went bankrupt and in 1870 he gave up and moved to New York City.

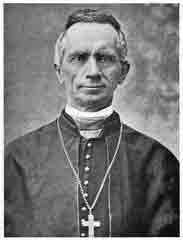
Bishop Elder of Natchez

A few residents showed their defiance of Union authorities. In 1864, the Catholic bishop of the Diocese of Natchez, William Henry Elder, refused to obey a Union order to compel his parishioners to pray for the U.S. president. In response, Union forces arrested Elder, convicted him, and jailed him briefly.

The memory of the war remains important for the city, as white Natchez became much more pro-Confederate after the war. The Lost Cause myth arose as a means for coming to terms with the Confederacy's defeat. It quickly became a definitive ideology, strengthened by its celebratory activities, speeches, clubs, and statues. The major organizations dedicated to maintaining the tradition were the United Confederate Veterans and the United Daughters of the Confederacy. At Natchez, although the local newspapers and veterans played a role in the maintenance of the Lost Cause, elite women particularly were important, especially in establishing memorials such as the Civil War Monument dedicated on Memorial Day 1890. The Lost Cause enabled women noncombatants to lay a claim to the central event in their redefinition of Southern history.

=== Vicksburg ===
Vicksburg was the site of the Siege of Vicksburg, a decisive victory as the Union forces gained control of the entire Mississippi River and cut the western states off. The battle consisted of a long siege, which was necessary because the town was on high ground, well fortified, and difficult to attack directly. The hardships of the civilians were extreme during the siege, with heavy shelling and starvation all around. Some 30,000 Confederates surrendered during the long campaign, but rather than being sent to prison camps, they were paroled and sent home until they could be exchanged for Union prisoners.

=== Greenville ===
Greenville was a pivotal village for Grant's northern operations in Mississippi during the Vicksburg campaign. The area of the Delta surrounding Greenville was considered the "breadbasket" for providing Vicksburg's military with corn, hogs, beef, mules and horses. Beginning at the end of March 1863, Greenville was the target of General Frederick Steele's Expedition. The design of this expedition was to reconnoiter Deer Creek as a possible route to Vicksburg and to create havoc and cause damage to confederate soldiers, guerrillas, and loyal (Confederate) landowners. Highly successful, Steele's men seized almost 1000 head of livestock (horses, mules, and cattle) and burned 500,000 bushels of corn during their foray. In addition to the damage done, the Union soldiers also acquired several hundred slaves, who, wishing to escape the bonds of slavery left their plantations and followed the troops from Rolling Fork back to Greenville. It was at this time that General Ulysses S. Grant determined that if any of the slaves chose to do so, they could cross the Union lines and become U.S. soldiers. The first black regiments were formed during the Greenville expedition, and by the end of the expedition nearly 500 ex-slaves were learning the "school of the soldier." General Steele's activity in the delta around Greenville pulled the attention of the Confederate leaders away from the Union activities on the Louisiana side of the Mississippi River as they moved on Vicksburg. More importantly, it had serious consequences for the people and soldiers of Vicksburg who were now deprived of a most important source of supplies, food, and animals. In early May, as retaliation for Confederate artillery firing on shipping on the Mississippi River, Commander Selfridge of the U.S. Navy ordered ashore 67 marines and 30 sailors, landing near Chicot Island. Their orders were to "put to the torch" all homes and buildings of those citizens guilty of aiding and abetting Confederate forces. By the end of the day of May 9, the large and imposing mansions, barns, stables, cotton gins, overseer dwellings and slave quarters of the Blanton and Roach plantations were in ruins. Additional damage was done to Argyle Landing and Chicot Island and other houses, barns and outbuildings. The destruction of Greenville was completed on May 6 when a number of Union infantrymen slipped ashore from their boats and burned every building in the village but two (a house and a church).

=== Choctaw County ===
During the war, Choctaw County Unionists formed a "Loyal League" allied with the U.S. to "break up the war by advising desertion, robbing the families of those who remained in the army, and keeping the Federal authorities advised."

=== Others ===
Columbus was an important hospital town early in the war. Columbus also had an arsenal that produced gunpowder as well as cannons and handguns. Columbus was targeted by the Union on at least two different occasions, but Union commanders failed to attack the town, due to the activities of Nathan Bedford Forrest and his men. Many of the casualties from the Battle of Shiloh were brought there, and thousands were buried in the town's Friendship Cemetery. Canton was an important rail and logistics center. Many wounded soldiers were treated in or transported through the city, and, as a consequence, it too has a large Confederate cemetery.

Meridian's strategic position at a major railroad junction made it the home of a Confederate arsenal, military hospital, and prisoner-of-war stockade, as well as the headquarters for a number of state offices. The disastrous Chunky Creek Train Wreck of 1863 happened 30 miles from Meridian, when the train was en route to the Vicksburg battle. After the Vicksburg campaign, Sherman's Union forces turned eastward. In February 1864, his army reached Meridian, where they destroyed the railroads and burned much of the area to the ground. After completing this task, Sherman is reputed to have said, "Meridian no longer exists."

A makeshift shipyard was established on the Yazoo River at Yazoo City after the Confederate loss of New Orleans. The shipyard was destroyed by Union forces in 1863. Then, Yazoo City fell back into Confederate hands. Union forces retook the city the following year and burned most of the buildings in the city.

== Battles in Mississippi ==
- Skirmish at Aberdeen
- Battle of Big Black River Bridge
- Battle of Booneville
- Battle of Brices Cross Roads
- Battle of Champion Hill
- Battle of Chickasaw Bayou
- Siege of Corinth
- Battle of Corinth
- Battle of Grand Gulf
- Battle of Iuka
- Battle of Jackson
- Battle of Meridian
- Battle of Okolona
- Battle of Oxford
- Battle of Port Gibson
- Battle of Raymond
- Battle of Senatobia
- Battle of Snyder's Bluff
- Battle of Tupelo
- Siege of Vicksburg

== Restoration to Union ==
As stipulated by the Reconstruction Acts during the Reconstruction period, Arkansas and Mississippi were part of the Fourth Military District of the U.S. Army. At various times, the district was commanded by generals Edward Ord, Alvan Cullem Gillem, and Adelbert Ames.

== See also ==
- Confederate States of America - animated map of state secession and confederacy
- List of Mississippi Civil War Confederate units
- List of Mississippi Union Civil War units
- Mississippi Secession Ordinance
- History of slavery in Mississippi

Preceded by Texas	List of C.S. states by date of admission to the Confederacy; Ratified Constitution on March 29, 1861 (5th)	Succeeded by South Carolina
