= Jeptha Vining Harris =

Jeptha Vining Harris may refer to:

- Jeptha Vining Harris (Georgia general) (1782 – 1856) Georgia militia brigadier general, War of 1812, Georgia state legislator
- Jeptha Vining Harris (Mississippi general) (1816 – 1899) Mississippi militia brigadier general, American Civil War, Mississippi state senator
- Jeptha Vining Harris (doctor) (1839 – 1914) Confederate States Army doctor; doctor, customs collector, school superintendent at Key West, Florida
- Jeptha Vining Harris (judge) (1865 – 1936) Attorney, judge at Key West, Florida
