= 37th Mississippi Infantry Regiment =

Infantry regiment of the Confederate States Army

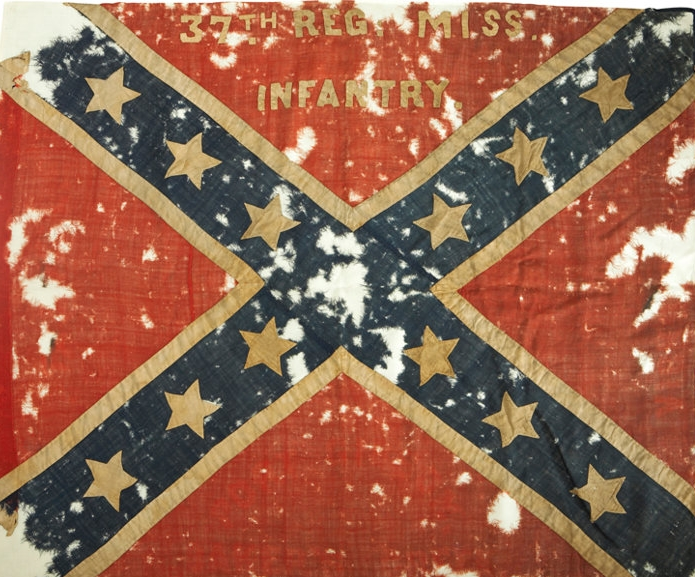
- Regimental Color of the 37th Mississippi Infantry
- Active: 1862–1865
- Disbanded: April 26, 1865
- Country: Confederate States
- Allegiance: Mississippi
- Branch: Army
- Type: Infantry
- Size: Regiment
- Facings: Light blue
- Battles: American Civil War; Battle of Iuka; Second Battle of Corinth; Siege of Vicksburg; Atlanta campaign; Franklin-Nashville campaign; Carolinas campaign

The 37th Mississippi Infantry Regiment was an infantry unit of the Confederate States Army. Consisting of volunteer forces from East-Central Mississippi organized in the spring of 1862, the regiment fought in numerous battles in its home state before being captured at Vicksburg on July 4, 1863. In the later phases of the war the regiment fought in Georgia and Tennessee before surrendering in April 1865.

== History ==
The 37th Mississippi Infantry Regiment was organized at Columbus, Mississippi on April 28, 1862. The first assignment of the newly-formed regiment was the defense of North Mississippi, where Union forces were seeking to control strategic railroad junctions. Under the command of General Sterling Price, the regiment fought at the Battle of Iuka in September, losing 5 killed and 27 wounded. In October at the Second Battle of Corinth, Confederate forces attempted to storm Union fortifications around the town, and the regimental commander, Colonel Robert McLain, was wounded during one of these unsuccessful attacks. The regiment's losses in this Confederate defeat were 19 killed and 62 wounded. As the Confederates retreated from Corinth, the Regiment was engaged again at the Battle of Hatchie's Bridge, taking further losses.

The following year, the 37th Mississippi Infantry Regiment was sent to defend the strategic city of Vicksburg along the Mississippi River. During the course of the multi-month Siege of Vicksburg, Union forces made numerous attacks on the city's defenses, during which the regiment lost 17 killed and 36 wounded. The entire Confederate force at Vicksburg was captured on July 4, 1863 and sent to parole camps to await exchange. Confederate troops were supposed to remain in camp until ordered back into service, but disheartened by defeat and motivated by a desire to return home, many deserted the army rather than rejoin the ranks.

Once the Regiment was reorganized for service, the 37th Mississippi Infantry Regiment was attached to General Edward C. Walthall's brigade and sent to Georgia in the spring of 1864. During the Atlanta Campaign, the regiment fought numerous battles around the city at Resaca, New Hope Church, Kennesaw Mountain, and Peachtree Creek, until the Confederates were forced to abandon Atlanta in the fall of 1864. The regiment then moved into Tennessee, fighting in the Franklin-Nashville Campaign. Greatly diminished by battle losses and desertion, in early 1865 the Regiment was downgraded and renamed the 37th Mississippi Infantry Battalion, with only three companies of the original ten available for service. The battalion joined Featherston's brigade in the Carolinas Campaign before surrendering on April 26, 1865, in North Carolina.

Another unrelated regiment, led by Colonel Samuel Benton, was briefly named the 37th Mississippi Infantry Regiment at the time of its formation in April 1862. However, this regiment received its permanent designation as the 34th Mississippi Infantry Regiment and was known as such from that point onward.

== Commanding officers ==
Commanding officers of the regiment included:

- Col. Robert McLain
- Col. Orlando S. Holland
- Lt. Col. William W. Wier
- Lt. Col. William S. Patton
- Maj. Samuel H. Terral

== Regimental order of battle ==
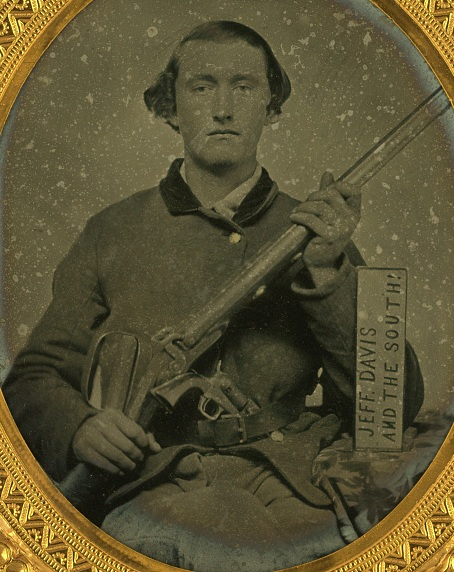
James W. Dearman of the "McLemore Guards," c. 1862.

Units of regiment included:

- Company A, "Patton's Company/Mississippi Boys" of Lauderdale County and Clarke County.
- Company B, "McLain Rifles" of Clarke County.
- Company C, "Clarke County Rescuers".
- Company D, "Enterprise Tigers" of Clarke County.
- Company E, "Shubuta Guards" of Clarke County.
- Company F, "De Soto Rifles" of Clarke County.
- Company G, "Yancey Guards" of Smith County.
- Company H, "Jasper Avengers" of Jasper County.
- Company I, "McLemore Guards" of Lauderdale County.
- Company K, "Jasper Guards" of Jasper County.

== See also ==
- List of Mississippi Civil War Confederate units
