= 1865 Mississippi gubernatorial election =

- October 2, 1865
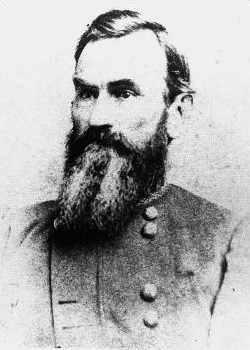

Nominee	Benjamin G. Humphreys	Ephraim S. Fisher	William S. Patton
Party	Nonpartisan	Nonpartisan	Nonpartisan
Popular vote	19,036	15,551	10,519
Percentage	42.20%	34.48%	23.32%
- County results Humphreys: 40–50% 50–60% 60–70% 70–80% 80–90% >90% Fisher: 30–40% 40–50% 50–60% 60–70% 80–90% Patton: 30–40% 40–50% 50–60% 60–70% 70–80% 80–90%
Governor before election
William L. Sharkey
Nonpartisan
Elected Governor
Benjamin G. Humphreys
Nonpartisan

The 1865 Mississippi gubernatorial election took place on October 2, 1865. Benjamin G. Humphreys defeated Ephraim S. Fisher and William S. Patton.

Andrew Johnson appointed William L. Sharkey provisional governor of Mississippi following the conclusion of the American Civil War. A prewar Whig and member of the Antebellum planter class, Sharkey's background reflected the profile of the Southern Unionist planters and entrepreneurs whose support Johnson sought for his planned bid for re-election. As governor, Sharkey oversaw the revision of the state's laws to comply with the terms of Presidential Reconstruction, abolishing slavery and annulling the 1861 Ordinance of Secession. His staunch opposition to Black suffrage forced him to rely on the support of former Confederates to uphold his authority. Sharkey permitted former Confederate officials to keep their positions and clashed with Union Army commanders over his plan to reorganize the state militia with Confederate veterans. He took minimal action to recognize the civil rights of freedpeople as part of an agreement to curtail the operations of the Freedmen's Bureau, which was a major antagonist of white planters.

With elections to choose the governor and other members of the reconstructed state government set for October 2, members of the state convention held a caucus on August 23, 1865, and nominated Fisher for governor. A prewar Whig who had briefly served in the Confederate home guard in 1864, Fisher represented the choice of the convention's Unionist Whigs, who comprised 75 percent of the delegates. His opponents, Humphreys and Patton, were both Unionists who opposed secession in 1861; Humphries, like Fisher, was a prewar Whig, while Patton had been a Unionist Democrat before the war. The campaign revolved around the rights of freedpeople and the need for debt relief following the war. With few concrete differences separating the candidates, prewar allegiances and wartime activities were important issues. Humphreys's opponents alleged he was ineligible to serve as governor, as he had not received a presidential pardon for his Confederate military service, while in several counties voters were unaware of his candidacy until after the election. Humphreys's military record increased his popularity with Confederate veterans, who were a significant voting bloc in the state.

The elections were a resounding conservative victory, as Whigs won the governorship, the state's five congressional races, and a majority in the Mississippi Legislature. Humphreys strongest performance was in the historical Whig heartland of the Mississippi embayment, while he received few or no votes in several counties in southeastern Mississippi. Patton carried the traditionally-Democratic southeastern counties; here, the combined vote for Humphreys and Fisher was less than the vote for John Bell in 1860. The strong correlation between Bell's showing and Humphreys's and Fishers's combined vote in the river counties, and between John C. Breckinridge's 1860 performance and Patton's vote in Southeastern Mississippi, indicates the persistence of partisanship despite the war. In contrast, the strong vote for Fisher over Humphreys in traditionally-Democratic Northeastern Mississippi represents a break with Second Party System allegiances influenced by the region's Unionist wartime leanings.

== Results ==
1865 Mississippi gubernatorial election
Party	Candidate	Votes	%
Nonpartisan	Benjamin G. Humphreys	19,036	42.20%
Nonpartisan	Ephraim S. Fisher	15,551	34.48%
Nonpartisan	William S. Patton	10,519	23.32%
Total votes		45,106	100.00
Nonpartisan hold			

== Bibliography ==
- Dubin, Michael J. (2010). United States Gubernatorial Elections, 1861-1911: The Official Results by State and County. McFarland & Company, Incorporated Publishers. ISBN 9780786456468.
- Foner, Eric (2014). Reconstruction: America's Unfinished Revolution, 1863–77 (Revised ed.). New York: HarperPerennial. ISBN 978-0-06-235451-8.
- Glashan, Roy R. (1979). American Governors and Gubernatorial Elections, 1775-1978. Westport, CT: Meckler Books.
- Harris, William C. (1967). Presidential Reconstruction in Mississippi. Baton Rouge: Louisiana State University Press.
