= Reuben Davis (politician) =

American politician

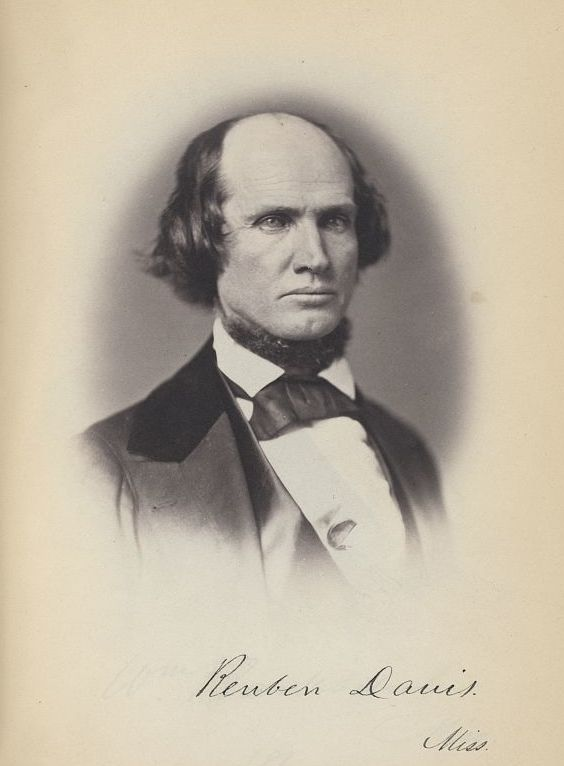

Member of the Confederate House of Representatives for Mississippi
- In office February 18, 1862 – November 1, 1863
- Succeeded by: W. D. Holder

Member of the U.S. House of Representatives from Mississippi's 2nd district
- In office March 4, 1857 – January 12, 1861
- Preceded by: Hendley S. Bennett
- Succeeded by: Joseph L. Morphis

Personal details
- Born: January 18, 1813 Winchester, Tennessee
- Died: October 14, 1890 (aged 77) Huntsville, Alabama

Military service
- Allegiance: United States; Mississippi
- Branch/service: US Army; Mississippi State Troops
- Years of service: 1846-1848 (US); 1861-1862 (MS)
- Rank: Colonel (US); Brigadier General (MS)
- Battles/wars: Mexican-American War; American Civil War

Reuben O. Davis (January 18, 1813 – October 14, 1890) was a lawyer, United States representative, Confederate representative and brigadier general from Mississippi.

== Early life ==
Born in Winchester, Tennessee into a family of Welsh origin, he moved with his parents to Alabama about 1818. His grandfather Joseph Davis was born in Wales in 1763 and emigrated to Virginia. Reuben Davis attended the public schools. Later, he studied medicine, but practiced only a few years, when he abandoned the profession. He then studied law, was admitted to the bar in 1834, and commenced practice in Aberdeen, Mississippi.

== Career ==
Davis "became one of the most successful criminal lawyers in the South", and was elected prosecuting attorney for the sixth judicial district 1835–1839. He was an unsuccessful Whig candidate for the Twenty-sixth Congress in 1838. He was then appointed by Governor Tilghman Tucker as a judge of the high court of appeals in 1842, but after four months' service resigned. According to the US Census, the Davis household kept 4 slaves in 1840, 18 in 1850, and 42 in 1860.

Davis served as colonel of the Second Regiment of Mississippi Volunteers in the Mexican–American War. After the Mexican war, he was a member of the Mississippi House of Representatives 1855–1857. He was elected as a Democrat to the Thirty-fifth and Thirty-sixth Congresses and served from March 4, 1857, to January 12, 1861, when he withdrew from Congress following Mississippi's secession. Davis then represented his state in the 1st Confederate States Congress until his resignation in October 1863.

During the American Civil War, Davis volunteered to serve as a Brigadier General of Mississippi troops sent to Kentucky as part of the Army of 10,000. This force did not see combat, and after returning home Davis briefly served again as a general in the Mississippi State Troops from June to August 1862 before resigning his commission. Davis ran for governor in the 1863 election but came a distant 3rd, defeated by Charles Clark. After the war, he resumed the practice of law. During an altercation with a prosecuting attorney on December 15, 1873, at the Columbus, Mississippi courthouse, Davis was shot while defending a prisoner, but recovered from his wound. He was an unsuccessful Greenback candidate for the Forty-sixth Congress in 1878. During this period he purchased a Greek Revival style house in Aberdeen, Mississippi, known as Sunset Hill, and wrote his Recollections of Mississippi and Mississippians. He died suddenly, while in Huntsville, Alabama in 1890 and was buried at the Odd Fellows Cemetery in Aberdeen.

== Legacy ==
The Atlantic reviewed his memoirs in the February 1890 issue and commented, "It is to be hoped that the South holds not many ex-rebels more unrepentant and unreconstructed than this one."

U.S. House of Representatives
Preceded by Hendley S. Bennett	Member of the U.S. House of Representatives from Mississippi's 2nd congressional district 1857–1861	Succeeded by Joseph L. Morphis
