= 1863 Mississippi gubernatorial election =

- October 5, 1863
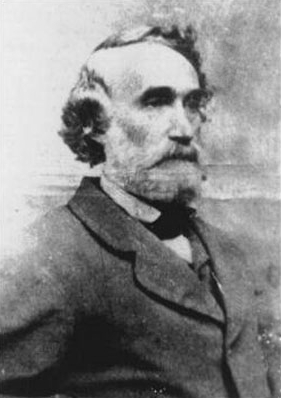

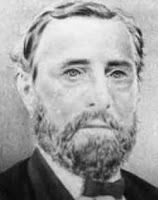

Nominee	Charles Clark	Absolom M. West	Reuben Davis
Party	Democratic	Democratic	Democratic
Popular vote	16,428	4,863	2,009
Percentage	70.51%	20.87%	8.62%
- County results Clark: 40–50% 50–60% 60–70% 70–80% 80–90% >90% West: 40–50% 50–60% 60–70% No vote Unknown
Governor before election
John J. Pettus
Democratic
Elected Governor
Benjamin G. Humphreys
Democratic

The 1863 Mississippi gubernatorial election was held on October 5, 1863, to elect the governor of Mississippi. Charles Clark, a Democrat, won against Democrat A. M. West and Fire-Eater Democrat Reuben Davis.

== General election ==
The elections of 1863 in Mississippi marked a shift towards peace during the American Civil War, as Governor Pettus, a fire-eating secessionist, became ineligible for a consecutive third term. Reuben Davis, an outspoken prowar Democrat and Pettus's political ally, was expected to succeed him but faced opposition from Charles Clark, a Delta Whig-turned-Democrat and war supporter. Clark, a veteran of the War with Mexico, had opposed secession in the 1850s but rose to the rank of brigadier general in the state and Confederate armies. Another candidate, Absalom West, a Democrat of "Whiggish bent" who had been a Unionist before the war, represented the peace movement. While Davis was an initial favorite, he lost support following a failed military campaign in Kentucky in 1861 and for criticizing Confederate war policy.

Despite being on crutches due to war wounds, Clark won the gubernatorial election, signaling a victory for conservatives turning away from earlier fire-eater ideologies. The election results were seen as indicative of a growing desire for peace in the midst of the Civil War. However, compared to earlier elections, turnout rates dropped as the 1863 campaign was considered "unlively."

== Results ==
Mississippi gubernatorial election, 1863
Party	Candidate	Votes	%
Democratic	Charles Clark	16,428	70.51%
Democratic	Absolom M. West	4,863	20.87%
Democratic	Reuben Davis	2,009	8.62%
Total votes		23,300 (Note: The official returns totaled 16,737, as several counties were rejected by the secretary of state; however, the legislature listed them without comment.)	100.00
Democratic hold			
