= 66th United States Colored Infantry Regiment =

- Active: 1863–1866
- Country: United States
- Allegiance: United States Union
- Branch: Infantry; United States Colored Troops
- Size: Regiment
- Engagements: American Civil War

The 66th United States Colored Infantry Regiment was an infantry regiment composed of African-American troops recruited from Mississippi that served in the Union Army during the American Civil War. The 66th Regiment was posted on garrison duty in Mississippi, Louisiana, and Arkansas, and fought several skirmishes with Confederate troops around the Mississippi River before being mustered out of service in 1866.

== History ==
Originally formed as the 4th Mississippi Infantry (African Descent) on December 11, 1863, at Vicksburg, Mississippi, the Regiment was first assigned to garrison duty at Goodrich's Landing and Lake Providence in East Carroll Parish, Louisiana. The Regiment was renamed the 66th United States Colored Troops Infantry on March 11, 1864. Most of the soldiers were former slaves from Mississippi.

The Regiment's first commanding officer was Colonel William T. Frohock, a white veteran of the 45th Illinois Infantry Regiment. All officers of the US Colored Troops during the Civil War were white; Black soldiers would not be commissioned as officers in the US Army until after the war. Frohock later resigned in September, 1864 and was replaced by Col. Michael W. Smith who commanded the Regiment until the end of the war.

United States Colored Troops (USCT) regiments were often assigned to garrison duties, where they guarded key strategic locations along the Mississippi River. Their deployment allowed more experienced Union regiments to be transferred to active combat operations elsewhere. General Henry Halleck wrote to Ulysses S. Grant, in July 1863, shortly after the capture of Vicksburg, expressing his opinion that the regiments of freshly-recruited Black troops would be suitable for this assignment: “The Mississippi should be the base of future operations east and west. When Port Hudson falls, the fortifications of that place, as well as of Vicksburg, should be so arranged as to be held by the smallest possible garrisons, thus leaving the mass of troops for operations in the field. I suggest that colored troops be used as far as possible in the garrisons."

The Regiment remained at Goodrich's Landing from the time of its formation until February, 1865. During 1864, the 66th fought several skirmishes with Confederate forces in Louisiana and Mississippi, including actions at Columbia on February 4, Issaquena County, Mississippi on March 22, Goodrich Landing on March 24, Bayou Mason on July 2, Issaquena County on July 10, Goodrich Landing on July 16, Bayou Tensas on July 30, Issaquena County on August 17, and Bayou Tensas on August 26. These clashes were usually fought against small parties of Confederate raiders operating on either side of the Mississippi River. The 66th Regiment only suffered 1 combat casualty in these skirmishes, with a soldier wounded in action at Goodrich's Landing on March 24, 1864. However, enemy action was not the only threat to Civil War soldiers, disease claimed many more lives than battle. An inspection report of the 66th's camp at Goodrich's Landing in August, 1864 reported: "Sanitary condition: not good", 126 men of the Regiment were sick at the time. Overall in the final year of the war, the incidence of diseases caused by poor sanitary conditions such as dysentery was 36% higher in Colored Troops regiments than in white units, and Black troops were 25% more likely to die from such diseases.

In February 1865, the 66th Regiment was sent to the vicinity of Little Rock, Arkansas for approximately one month. In March, 1865, the 66th was sent back to Vicksburg, and that same month it reported an effective strength of 526 men. The Regiment remained at Vicksburg until being mustered out of service on March 20, 1866.

== See also ==
- List of United States Colored Troops Civil War Units
- United States Colored Troops
- List of Mississippi Union Civil War units
