= Absolom M. West =

Confederate Army general

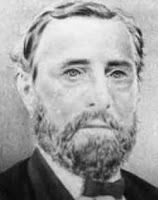

Personal details
- Born: Absolom Madden West; 1818 Alabama, U.S.
- Died: September 30, 1894 (aged 75–76) Holly Springs, Mississippi, U.S.
- Resting place: Hillcrest Cemetery
- Party: Whig (Before 1854); Democratic (1854–1876); Greenback (1876–1889)

Military service
- Allegiance: United States; Confederate States
- Branch/service: Mississippi State Troops
- Rank: Brigadier General
- Battles/wars: American Civil War

Absolom Madden West (1818 – September 30, 1894) was an American planter, Confederate militia general, state politician, railroad president and labor organizer. Born in Alabama, he became a plantation owner in Holmes County, Mississippi, and president of the Mississippi Central Railroad. He served in the American Civil War. After the war, he served in the Mississippi State Senate and ran for Vice President of the United States, unsuccessfully.

== Early life ==
Absolom Madden West was born in 1818 in Alabama. His father, Anderson West, was a county sheriff. He attended private schools for a few years and left school at the age of 14.

== Career ==
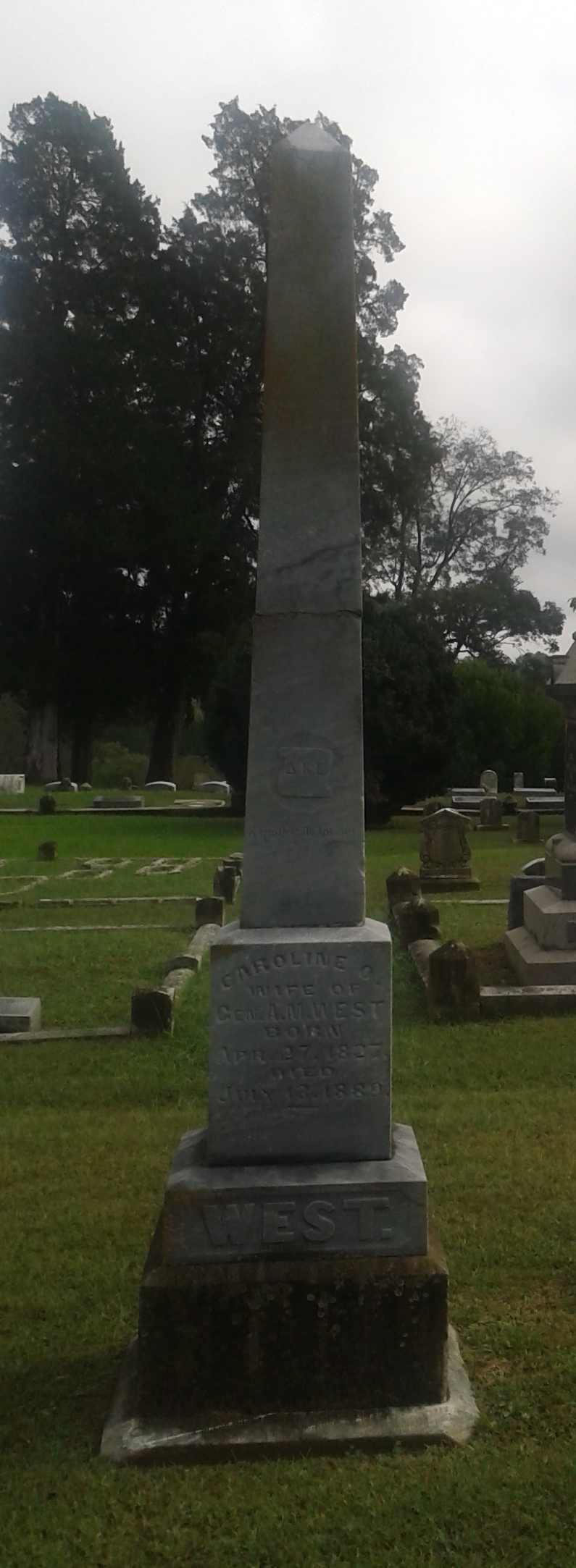
The West family obelisk at Hillcrest Cemetery

West obtained Federal land grants in Mississippi and moved to Holmes County, Mississippi, in 1837, where he became a planter. He won election to the Mississippi State Senate as a Whig in 1847. In 1853, he became an officer of the newly formed Mississippi Central Railroad.

Although initially an opponent of secession, when the American Civil War broke out, West became a brigadier general in the Mississippi Militia. He raised a regiment, and later assumed various administrative offices for the state. Sometimes simultaneously, he served as quartermaster-general, paymaster-general, and commissary-general of the Mississippi State Troops. At his direction, the legislature established a commission consisting of one lawyer and two businessmen to examine and audit the books and papers of his several offices. West ran for governor in the 1863 election but was defeated by Charles Clark. At the end of the war, West was the only officer of the state to make a final accounting. In 1864, West became president of the Mississippi Central Railroad. The railroad was sold to the Illinois Central in 1875. He returned to the State Senate.

Soon thereafter, West was elected to the U.S. House of Representatives although he, along with the rest of the unreconstructed Mississippi delegation, was not permitted to be seated. In the years that followed, West established a branch of the National Labor Union, and served as a Democratic elector for president in the election of 1876.

Re-elected to the State Senate, West soon became disenchanted with the Democrats, and joined the Greenback Party. For that party and for the Anti-Monopoly Party, West was a candidate for vice president on the ticket of Benjamin Butler in 1884. He initially declined his candidacy due to the Southern prejudice against Butler and fearing it would split the Democratic vote in Mississippi. He agreed to remain on the ticket if no Greenback electors were put out in Mississippi.

== Personal life and death ==
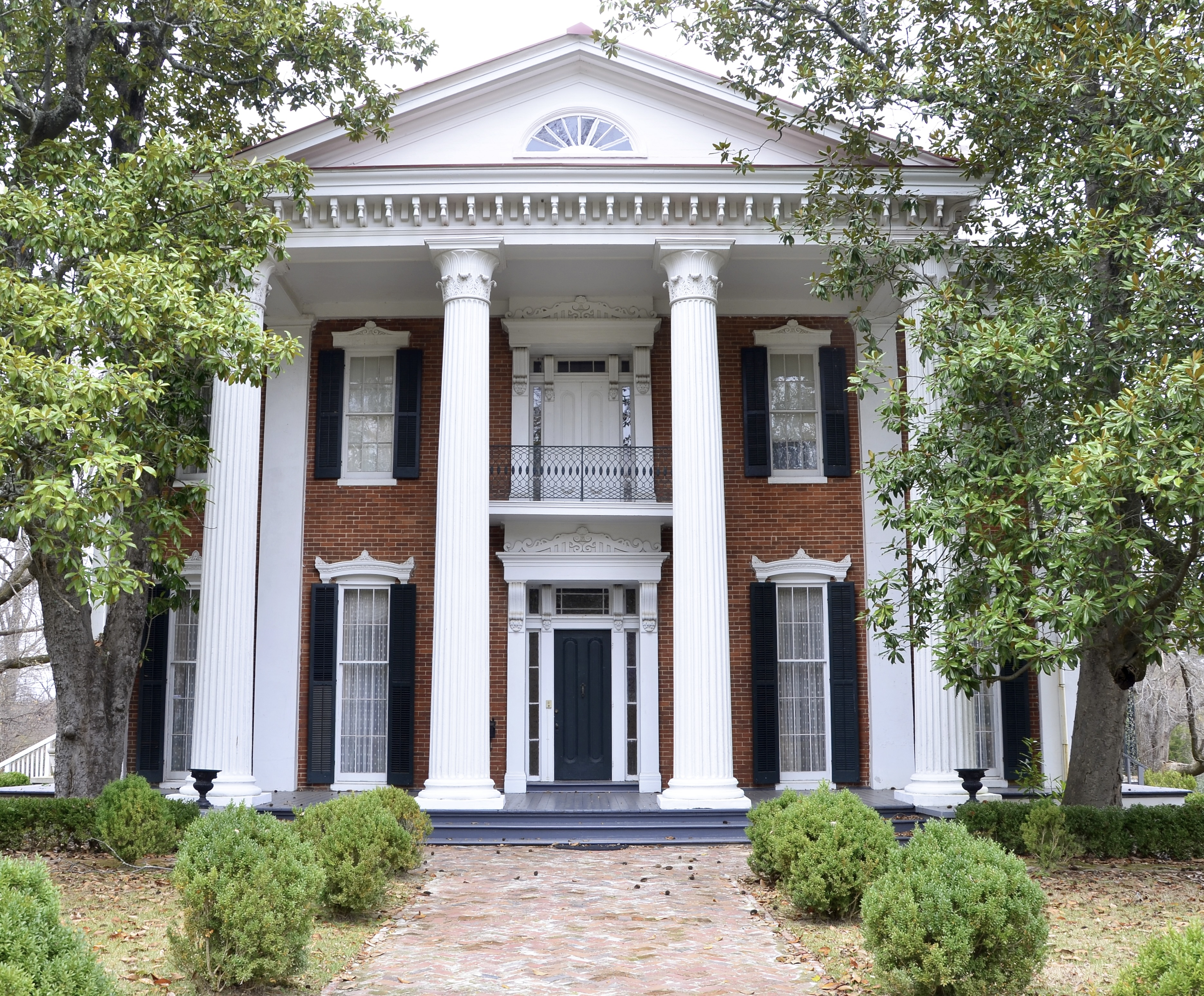
Oakleigh in Holly Springs, Mississippi.

West purchased Oakleigh, an Antebellum mansion in Holly Springs, Mississippi, from Judge Jeremiah W. Clapp in 1870. He died on September 30, 1894, in Holly Springs. He was buried in Holly Springs.

Party political offices
Preceded by Barzillai J. Chambers	Greenback nominee for Vice President of the United States; 1884	Party dissolved
