= List of Union units from Mississippi in the American Civil War =

List of 19th century military units

Flag of the Union, 1863—1865

This is a list of units from Mississippi that served in the Union army during the American Civil War. Only a single unit of white Union troops was raised within the state, along with several regiments of African-American volunteers, that became part of the United States Colored Troops.. The list of Confederate Mississippi units is shown separately.

== Units ==
- 1st Battalion, Mississippi Mounted Rifles (Union)
- 1st Mississippi Cavalry Regiment (African Descent) – redesignated 3rd U.S. Colored Cavalry Regiment
- 1st Mississippi Heavy Artillery Regiment (African Descent) – redesignated 5th U.S. Colored Heavy Artillery Regiment
- 2nd Mississippi Heavy Artillery Regiment (African Descent) – redesignated 6th U.S. Colored Heavy Artillery Regiment
- 1st Mississippi Infantry Regiment (African Descent) – redesignated 51st U.S. Colored Infantry Regiment
- 2nd Mississippi Infantry Regiment (African Descent) – redesignated 52nd U.S. Colored Infantry Regiment
- 3rd Mississippi Infantry Regiment (African Descent) – redesignated 53rd U.S. Colored Infantry Regiment
- 4th Mississippi Infantry Regiment (African Descent) – redesignated 66th United States Colored Infantry Regiment
- 5th Mississippi Infantry Regiment (African Descent) – organization not completed
- 6th Mississippi Infantry Regiment (African Descent) – redesignated 58th U.S. Colored Infantry Regiment

== See also ==
- Lists of American Civil War Regiments by State
- Mississippi in the American Civil War
- Southern Unionists
- United States Colored Troops
