= 1868 Mississippi gubernatorial election =

- June 22–23, 1868
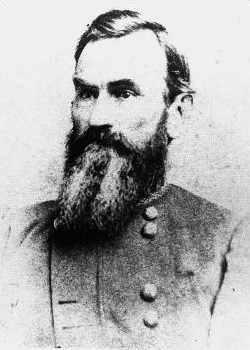

Nominee	Benjamin G. Humphreys	Beroth B. Eggleston
Party	Conservative	Republican
Popular vote	63,321 (Note: The results of the election were declared invalid following the rejection of the proposed Constitution of Mississippi in a concurrent referendum.)	55,250
Percentage	53.42%	46.61%
- County results Humphreys: 50–60% 60–70% 70–80% 80–90% >90% Eggleston: 50–60% 60–70% 70–80% 80–90% >90%
Governor before election
Adelbert Ames
Republican
Governor after election
Adelbert Ames
Republican

A gubernatorial election was held in Mississippi from June 22 to 23, 1868. The Conservative candidate Benjamin G. Humphreys, who was the 26th governor of Mississippi from 1865 until June 15, 1868, outpolled the Republican candidate Beroth B. Eggleston, the former president of the state constitutional convention. However, in a concurrent referendum, voters rejected the proposed Constitution of Mississippi; consequently, the results of the election were declared invalid, and Adelbert Ames, the incumbent military governor following Humphrey's removal, continued in office until after the next election.

== Results ==
Mississippi gubernatorial election, 1868
Party	Candidate	Votes	%
Conservative	Benjamin G. Humphreys	63,321	53.42%
Republican	Beroth B. Eggleston	55,250	46.61%
Others	Scattering	5	0.00%
Total votes		118,526	100.00
Republican hold			
