= Tullius Cicero Tupper =

Confederate States Army general of the US Civil War

Major General Tullius Cicero Tupper
- Born: February 9, 1809; Barnard, Vermont, US
- Died: August 14, 1866 (aged 57); Canton, Mississippi, US
- Alma mater: University of Vermont
- Spouse: Mary Harding Drane
- Children: 5
- Military career
- Allegiance: Mississippi
- Branch: Mississippi State Troops
- Service years: 1862–1863
- Rank: Major General
- Conflicts: American Civil War; Vicksburg campaign

Tullius Cicero Tupper (February 9, 1809 – August 14, 1866) was an American lawyer, newspaper publisher, and major general of the Mississippi State Troops in the American Civil War.

== Early life ==
T.C. Tupper was born February 9, 1809, to a family of English descent in Barnard, Vermont. He attended the University of Vermont, and then moved to Canton, Mississippi. In Mississippi, he worked as an attorney and was the publisher of the Canton Herald newspaper in the late 1830s. Tupper killed two men in duels while living in Mississippi, but was never convicted of murder for their deaths.

T.C. Tupper married Mary Harding Drane in 1842. The couple had five children: Henry Clay Tupper (1842–1928), Tullius Cicero Tupper II (1845–1915), Walter Drane Tupper (1847–1906), Mary Green Tupper (1851–1853), and Anna Mary Powell (1854–1919).

== American Civil War ==
As a prominent attorney, deemed "a highly respectable and patriotic citizen," by Jefferson Davis, Tupper acted as an advisor to Mississippi governor John J. Pettus during the secession crisis. Tupper was commissioned as Major General of the Mississippi State Troops on March 10, 1862, and tasked with reorganizing the state defense force from the antebellum state militia companies. The State troops experienced problems with discipline and supply, and were faced with competing demands from the Governor to keep troops under local control for state defense, as opposed to the Confederate government, which wished to bring all military forces under the direct control of the Confederate army. General Tupper believed the State Troops should be sent back to their communities to act as a traditional home guard militia after an initial period of military training, but Mississippi Governor Pettus advocated a centralized system that kept the State Troops in camps. Due to these tensions, Tupper resigned his commission as Major General in the spring of 1863, and Samuel J. Gholson took over command of the State Troops.

After his resignation, Tupper returned to civilian life, and died on August 14, 1866, in Canton, Mississippi.
