= 53rd United States Colored Infantry Regiment =

53rd United States Colored Infantry
- Country: United States
- Allegiance: United States Union
- Branch: Infantry; United States Colored Troops
- Size: Regiment
- Engagements: American Civil War

The 53rd United States Colored Infantry was an infantry regiment that served in the Union Army during the American Civil War. Originally formed as the 3rd Regiment Mississippi Volunteers (African Descent), the regiment was composed of African American enlisted men commanded by white officers. The 53rd served on garrison duty in Louisiana, Mississippi, and Arkansas before being mustered out of service in 1866.

== Service ==
The Regiment was originally organized as the 3rd Regiment Mississippi Volunteers (African Descent) at Warrenton, Mississippi on May 19, 1863. The first Colonel of the Regiment was Richard H. Ballinger, formerly of the 3rd Illinois Cavalry. All officers of the US Colored Troops were white, Black soldiers would not be commissioned as officers in the US Army until after the war. The 3rd Mississippi was posted on garrison duty at Milliken's Bend and Goodrich's Landing in Louisiana until March, 1864. In December 1863, Col. Ballinger reported that several men of the Regiment had threatened to mutiny, he was ordered to send the offenders back to Vicksburg, Mississippi for court-martial.

The Regiment was redesignated as the 53rd United States Colored Troops Infantry on March 11, 1864. Col. Ballinger resigned the same day, and Col. Orlando Risdon became the commander of the Regiment. The 53rd was sent on a scouting mission to Grand Gulf in March, and fought a skirmish there on July 16.

During Price's Missouri Expedition, the 53rd Regiment was sent to Arkansas as reinforcements. On October 22, 1864, while arriving via transport ship at Saint Charles, Arkansas, the Union troops were fired upon by Confederates posted along the banks of the White River. 2 men were killed, 17 were injured, and one officer later died of his wounds. The Regiment was sent back to Vicksburg in February, 1865 and remained in Mississippi for the rest of the war.

The regiment was attached to 1st Brigade, 1st Division, United States Colored Troops, District of Vicksburg, Mississippi, to October 1864. 1st Brigade, 4th Division, XVI Corps, to November 1864. Department of Arkansas to February 1865. District of Vicksburg, Mississippi, and Department of Mississippi to March 1866. The Regiment mustered out of service March 8, 1866.

Combat casualties of the 53rd Regiment: 1 killed at Haynes' Bluff, Mississippi, 2 killed, 1 wounded at White River, Arkansas.

== Commanders ==
- Colonel Richard H. Ballinger
- Colonel Orlando Charles Risdon
- Captain Edward Lyon Buchwalter

== See also ==
- List of United States Colored Troops Civil War Units
- United States Colored Troops
- List of Mississippi Union Civil War units
