= Mississippi State Troops =

Mississippi State defense force during the American Civil War

- Active: 1862–1865
- Disbanded: May 4, 1865
- Country: Confederate States
- Allegiance: Mississippi
- Branch: State troops
- Type: Infantry and cavalry
- Nickname: "Minute men"
- Campaigns: American Civil War; Grierson's Raid; Siege of Vicksburg; Meridian Expedition

Commanders
- Notable commanders: T.C. Tupper; Samuel J. Gholson

The Mississippi State Troops were military units formed by the Mississippi Legislature for State defense (rather than Confederate service) during the American Civil War. Five infantry regiments, four infantry battalions, and one cavalry battalion were drafted from the Mississippi militia in 1862. Two of the infantry regiments participated in the 1863 siege of Vicksburg, and several State Troop cavalry units were later reorganized and brought into Confederate service. However, most of the State Troop units were kept in military camps and never saw combat. In 1864, another set of State Troop units was created, with all white men aged 16–55 required to report for 30 days military service. Reserve State Troop units were also organized in 1864, consisting of men and boys who were otherwise too young or too old for regular military service. All of the remaining State Troops were officially disbanded when Confederate Lieutenant-General Richard Taylor surrendered all Confederate forces in the Department of Alabama, Mississippi, and East Louisiana to United States authorities on May 4, 1865, at Citronelle, Alabama.

== Mississippi militia and predecessor units ==
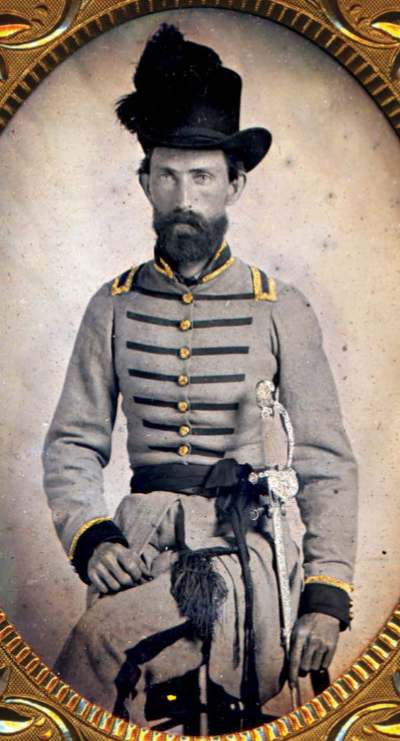
A Mississippi militia cavalry officer wearing the state uniform as approved by the military board at the time of secession, in January 1861.

The Mississippi territorial militia was first organized on September 8, 1798, when the Mississippi Territory was created. All free males between age 16 and 50 except government officials, doctors, and clergymen were subject to militia service. The Mississippi territorial militia arrested Aaron Burr in 1807, and fought against the Creek Indians and the British in the War of 1812.

Upon Mississippi gaining statehood in 1817, the organization of the state militia continued along the same lines. The militia could be called out for military service in the event of war or domestic disturbance, but was not a standing army with government-issued weapons or professional officers. Officers were elected by the public with the governor as Commander-in-chief, and men enrolled in the militia were required to bring their own weapons. All free white males 18-45 were subject to militia duty, failing to appear was punished with a $5 fine. The Governor could draft men from the militia to serve full-time in the military in times of war. The county-level militia companies had to muster four times a year for training, a local historian described the amateurish character of these musters: "After a brief parade, which consisted in a blundering execution of unwarlike tactics, these men would start drinking and usually several fights occurred."

As sectional tensions rose through the 1850s, there were proposals to create a standing army for the state, but this was not followed through. In 1858, the state organized and provided equipment to 4 volunteer militia companies: the Quitman Light Infantry, Quitman Guards, Covington Guards, and Light Guard. And in 1860, a state military board was created and tasked with securing arms from American and European manufacturers, but no formal state military force beyond the militia existed as of yet.

Prior to the formation of the Confederate States Army in the spring of 1861, the state was responsible for managing its own defense in the early stages of the secession crisis. In January 1861, the state secession convention adopted an ordinance to organize Mississippi's military forces, proposing 4 brigades of two regiments each for state service. Jefferson Davis was chosen as major general of the state forces, with Earl Van Dorn, Charles Clark, James L. Alcorn, and Christopher H. Mott as brigadier generals. These generals and the governor comprised the military board and were tasked with organizing and managing the armed forces of the state. However, shortly afterwards Jefferson Davis was elected as President of the Confederacy and he left his position in the Mississippi state military. Van Dorn, Clark, and Mott all joined the Confederate army, they were replaced by John W. O'Ferrall, Charles G. Dahlgren, and Absolom M. West as brigadier generals of Mississippi forces. Alcorn was promoted to major general and Reuben Davis also joined as major general. Alcorn's brigade was sent to Kentucky and was mustered into Confederate service (rather than state service) as the 23rd Mississippi Infantry on October 28, 1861.

In the fall of 1861, in response to a call for assistance from Confederate forces in Kentucky, a poorly-organized and unequipped volunteer force known as the Army of 10,000 was sent north under the command of militia generals Alcorn and Davis. These troops had to supply their own weapons and clothing, and they contributed very little to the Confederate effort in Kentucky. The Mississippi generals refused to take orders from Confederate officers, and the Army's usefulness was limited because the troops had volunteered for only 60 days. After suffering from extreme winter weather and outbreaks of disease, the Army returned to Mississippi in February 1862 and was disbanded. The state military board was abolished by the legislature on December 20, 1861. After the fiasco in Kentucky, it was clear that the state militia needed to be reorganized in order to become an effective military force.

== 1862 organization ==
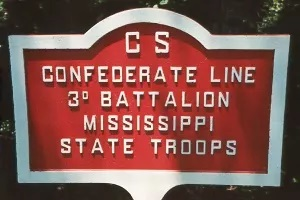
Marker at Vicksburg National Military Park showing the position of the 3rd Battalion Infantry, Mississippi State Troops on the Vicksburg defensive lines during the siege.

The Mississippi State Troops, also known as the "minute men" were organized by an act of the state legislature enacted on January 29, 1862. Tullius C. Tupper was commissioned as Major General of the state troops and tasked with organizing regiments from the existing state militia companies. Colonels of the local county militias were required to supply companies of men enlisted for six months service, although some State Troops extended their service for longer. Originally there were 70 infantry and 13 cavalry companies called up in the fall of 1862, these were organized into 5 regiments of infantry, 4 battalions of infantry, and 1 battalion of cavalry. Although men serving in the State Troops were not officially part of the Confederate army, the 1862 law creating the State Troops specified that they were subject to the orders of Confederate officers, and during the 1863 Siege of Vicksburg, two units of the State Troops did serve under the overall command of Confederate General John C. Pemberton. Unlike the antebellum militia, where men stayed at home and only assembled a few times a year locally, the State Troops were stationed in military camps far from home (although still within the state) during their term of service. General Tupper believed the State Troops should be sent back to their communities to act as a traditional home guard militia after an initial period of military training, but Mississippi Governor John J. Pettus advocated a centralized system that kept the State Troops in camps.

Many of the men called into State Troops service were older and had families, an analysis of the 3rd Battalion State Troops Infantry found that the average age in that unit was 37, compared to an average age of 25 for men in the regular Confederate army. The initial mobilization of the State Troops in 1862 interfered with the harvest season, which generated numerous complaints from the men called to serve, as well as their families. With many of the younger men serving in the Confederate Army, and the older men called to serve in the State Troops, many white Mississippians feared a lack of manpower to police the enslaved population would result in a slave uprising. Many soldiers, including officers, sent petitions to the governor complaining about being forced into service and requesting to be sent home, and rates of desertion, absence without leave, and requests for medical discharge from the State Troops were high. Organization was extremely poor, such that Mississippi officials could never provide their Confederate military counterparts with an accurate count of the number of State Troops under their command.

“What good are they doing? Why keep them in camp?... Now is the very time they should be at home, getting their plantations in order, preparing their lands for seed, and making all the necessary arrangements for a big crop.”

— Canton American Citizen newspaper, February 27, 1863

There was a tension between the Confederate Army's demand for more regular troops and the desire of Confederate state governors to keep State Troops for local service, as well as the wishes of some Mississippians not to be sent to a distant battlefield in another state. When Confederate conscription came into effect the same year that the State Troops were created, some men subject to conscription sought to meet these requirements by serving in the State Troops while remaining in their home state. Governor Pettus ordered that men serving in the State Troops would be exempt from conscription into the Confederate army, and he resisted efforts to incorporate the State Troops into the regular army. On April 16, 1863, Pettus wrote to Confederate President Jefferson Davis defending the need for State Troops: “Their presence in the field has been necessary to save north Miss from being over run and desolated while all the Confederate Troops were engaged with superior forces of the enemy”. Partly due to these competing demands for manpower, General T.C. Tupper resigned his commission in the spring of 1863 and General Samuel J. Gholson was appointed commander of the State Troops on April 18, 1863. The 1862 infantry regiments were all kept under local Mississippi control, but many of the cavalry regiments were later converted to regular Confederate regiments.

Most State Troops remained in camp and were not engaged in combat, but two regiments were present at the siege of Vicksburg under the command of brigadier general Jeptha V. Harris. The Fifth Regiment Infantry State Troops was sent to Vicksburg in April, 1863, approximately 50 men and officers of the Fifth Regiment died during the siege. After being captured when the city surrendered, the Fifth Regiment was mustered out of service on September 21, 1863. The Third Battalion State Troops was sent to defend Vicksburg in November, 1862. Approximately 21 of the men died during the siege. After being captured, the Third Battalion was sent to Columbus on August 26, 1863, and dissolved. The initial term of all of the remaining infantry regiments expired by November, 1863 and the units were disbanded.

== 1862 infantry units ==
First Regiment Infantry, Col. Benjamin King, Lt. Col. L. Lawhorn. Organized July 31, 1862 at Grenada.

- Company A, Copiah Minute Men
- Company B, Copiah Guards
- Company C, Raymond Company
- Company D, Hinds County
- Company E, Jackson Company
- Company F, Madison County
- Company G, Rankin County
- Company H
- Company I, Rankin City
- Company K, Madison City
- Company L, Davis Guards of Attala County

Second Regiment Infantry, Col. D.H. Quinn, Lt. Col. James Conerly, Organized 11 August 1862 at Hinds County.

- Company A, Lawrence County
- Company B, Lawrence County
- Company C, Amite County Minute Men
- Company D, Covington Farmers
- Company E, Franklin County
- Company F, Meadville
- Company G, Marion Grays, of Marion County
- Company H, Pike County
- Company I, Holmesville

Third Regiment Infantry, Col. William J. Owens, Lt. Col. J.A. Hartin. Organized August 7, 1862.

- Company A, Coffeeville
- Company B, Carroll County Defenders
- Company C, Carrollton
- Company D, Coffeeville
- Company E, Grenada
- Company F, Lexington
- Company G, Holmes County
- Company H, Greensboro
- Company I, Greensboro
- Company K, Pittsboro

Fourth Regiment Infantry, Col. W.C. Bromley, Lt. Col. J.J. Stone, Lt. Col. Thomas Whitesides. Organized at Grenada, August 25, 1862.

- Company A, Lafayette County
- Company B, Itawamba Chivalry
- Company C
- Company D
- Company E
- Company F
- Company G
- Company H, Itawamba State Guards
- Company I, Lafayette Defenders
- Company K, Bee Minute Men of Itawamba County
- Company L

Fifth Regiment Infantry, Col. Henry C. Robinson, Lt. Col. D.W. Metts. Organized at Meridian September 5–6, 1862. Disbanded September 21, 1863 after service at Vicksburg.

- Company A, Decatur
- Company B, Paulding
- Company C, Marion Station
- Company D, Enterprise
- Company E, Marion Station
- Company F, Louisville
- Company G, Raleigh
- Company H, Winchester & Ellisville
- Company I, Scooba

First Battalion Infantry, Maj. W.B. Harper. Company D of the First Battalion under Captain J.M. Hall participated in the Battle of Raymond, May 12, 1863.

- Company A, Scott County
- Company B, Carthage
- Company C, Leake County
- Company D, Scott County Rebels
- Company E, Westville

Second Battalion Infantry, Maj. Henry F. Cook. Reported total strength of 88 men in January, 1863.

Third Battalion Infantry, Lt. Col. Thomas A. Burgin. Organized at Okolona September 1862. Disbanded August 26, 1863 after service at Vicksburg.

- Company A, Monroe County
- Company B, Monroe County
- Company C, Macon
- Company D, Lowndes County Minute Men
- Company E, Oktibbeha County
- Company F, Chickasaw County
- Company G, Gainesville
- Greene and Perry County Squad

Fourth Battalion Infantry, Lt. Co. A.J. Postletwait, Maj. J.D. Fairley. Organized October 23, 1862.

== 1862 cavalry units ==
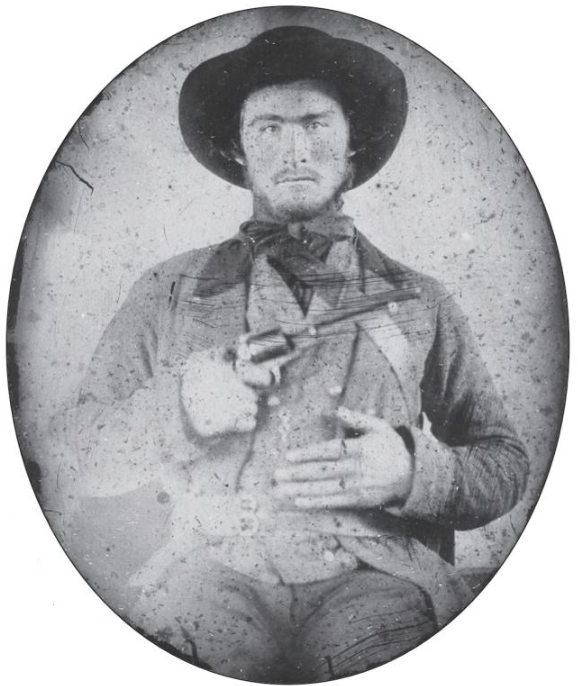
David Andrew McElwain, of the 2nd Regiment, Mississippi State Troops Cavalry, Company A.

State Troops cavalry units were organized in 1862 & 1863, but they were plagued by the same problems that limited the effectiveness of the organization as a whole. An inspection report of the cavalry force in Mississippi in September, 1863 reported poor discipline and high rates of absenteeism in the State Troops: "This command is generally not in good condition...The partisan and State troops are not reliable, being in poor discipline and over one-half the number on the rolls being at their homes...In raids of the enemy many of the partisan and State troops disperse...The State troops in their present unsettled state are but harbors for deserters and persons trying to avoid the military service."

Several of the 1862 State Troops cavalry units initially mustered for state service were reorganized and mustered into Confederate service in the spring of 1864 with the approval of Mississippi Governor Charles Clark. Major General Samuel J. Gholson, who had led the State Troops since the spring of 1863, was commissioned into the Confederate Army as a brigadier general at this time. Gholson's Mississippi brigade served under the command of Major General Nathan Bedford Forrest and participated in many cavalry actions against Union troops in North Mississippi until the close of the war.

First Battalion Cavalry, Col. Green L. Blythe, Lt. Col. A.C. Edmundson. Organized September 1862. Also called the Second Regiment, Partisan Rangers.

- Company A, De Soto Partisans
- Stillwelll's Company of Marshall County
- Bowen's Rangers

Second Regiment Cavalry (Lowry's Regiment) Under Colonel J.F. Smith, this regiment fought against Union cavalry during Grierson's Raid and Streight's Raid in April 1863. In January 1864, the 2nd State Troops Cavalry commanded by Colonel William L. Lowry was assigned to General Robert V. Richardson's brigade in Nathan Bedford Forrest's Confederate Cavalry Corps.

This regiment was supposed to be turned over to Confederate service following a mid-1863 agreement between Governor Pettus and Confederate President Jefferson Davis, but there continued to be some confusion as to the chain of command, with Richardson reporting "they are State troops and refuse to obey my orders, but promise cooperation". In the interim, the 2nd State Troops regiment was under the command of General Gholson, who coordinated his efforts with Forrest's Confederate cavalry. In May 1864, the regiment was officially mustered into Confederate service and given the title of 6th Mississippi Cavalry, even though another unit already had that designation. After joining Confederate service the unit was most often simply called "Lowry's Regiment". At the Battle of Egypt Station, General Gholson was severely wounded, losing his arm, and his cavalry brigade was consolidated with another State Troops regiment led by Colonel T.C. Ashcraft. After the April 2, 1865 Battle of Selma in Alabama, this consolidated unit surrendered with the remainder of Forrest's Cavalry Corps on May 22, 1865.

- Company A, Citizen Guards of Tippah County
- Company B, Johnson Partisans of Chickasaw County
- Company C, Monroe County
- Tuscumbia Rangers
- Company D, Rocky Ford
- Company E, Mississippi Rangers Elliston
- Company F, Monroe County
- Company G, Chickasaw City
- Company H, J.V. Harris Guards of Athens
- Company I, Chickasaw County
- Company K, Pettus Rangers of Tippah County
- Company L, of Tishomingo County

Third Regiment Cavalry, Col. John McGuirk, Lt. Col. James A. Barksdale, Lt. Col. H.H. Barksdale. Organized 1862, 13 companies. Involved in skirmishes in North Mississippi opposing Union cavalry raids, 1863. Transferred to Confederate service April, 1864 as the 3d Mississippi Cavalry Regiment.

Third Battalion, Cavalry Lt. Col. Thomas C. Ashcraft. Organized 1864, transferred to Confederate service May 1, 1864 and consolidated with Harris’ battalion.

- Company A
- Company B, Chesterville
- Company C, Marietta
- Company D, Saltillo
- Company E, Richmond
- Company F, Fulton

In addition, other cavalry companies formed in 1862 for State Troops service which were later converted to Confederate service include:

Davenport's Battalion Cavalry, Maj. Stephen Davenport. Organized summer 1863, later merged into Sixth Cavalry Regiment.

Dunn's Battalion, Mississippi Rangers, Capt. J.B Dunn, organized 18 June 1862. Pettus Partisans, Capt. W.B. Prince, organized 4 August 1862.

Forrest's Battalion, also known as Sixth Battalion and First Battalion. Capt. Aaron H. Forrest, organized 1863.

Ham's Battalion, also known as Sixteenth Battalion. Maj. T.W. Ham, organized summer 1863. Involved in skirmishes at Palo Alto and Camp Davies. Transferred in May 1864 to Confederate Service.

- Company A, Tishomingo Rangers
- Company B, Tishomingo County
- Company C, Booneville
- Company D, Booneville
- Company E, Grenada
- Company F, Brown's Mill
- Company G, Booneville
- Company H, Camp Creek

Harris’ Battalion, also known as Second Battalion. Maj. Thomas W. Harris, organized fall 1863. Transferred to Confederate service May 1, 1864 and consolidated with Ashcraft's battalion.

- Company A, Pontotoc County Minute Men
- Company B, Wood's Company of Pontotoc
- Company C, Monroe County

Perrin's Battalion, Lt. Col. Robert O. Perrin, organized 1863, later mustered into Confederate service as the 11th Mississippi Cavalry Regiment.

Other State Troop cavalry companies:

- Johnson's Cavalry Company
- Matthew's Battalion Cavalry
- Outlaw's Battalion - Partisan Rangers
- Yazoo Battalion, Lt. Col. Charles F. Hamer
- Saunder's Battalion, Maj. B.F. Saunders
- Street's Battalion. Maj. Solomon G. Street, merged into Fifteenth Tennessee Cavalry.

== 1864 organization ==
In February 1864, the Confederacy passed a new conscription act broader than those previously in force since 1862, now encompassing all white men from age 17–50 with fewer exemptions. Governor Charles Clark wrote to the Confederate Secretary of War James Seddon asking how the state troops fit into this new conscription framework. Seddon replied that he considered the state troops to be merely militia forces and thus subject to conscription into the regular Confederate Army. This was a change from January 1863 when Seddon had written to Governor Pettus agreeing that state troops on active service should not be subject to conscription, stating that, "the state organizations of troops are too important & the time is too critical for any interference to be made with them." Regardless of Seddon's perspective, Governor Clark claimed a right to continue mustering men for state service, and maintained the independence of his Mississippi State Troops until the close of the war.

Confederate control of Mississippi was in disarray by 1864, with Vicksburg captured, the state capital of Jackson burned, and much of the railroad infrastructure destroyed. Many areas were overrun by bands of deserters, and Union cavalry raided at will across the interior of the state. In August, 1864, Governor Clark called on every able-bodied white male in the state not otherwise in military service to assemble at Grenada, Okolona, or Macon for enlistment in the State Troops. The Mississippi Legislature authorized 30 days mandatory military service for boys and men aged 16–55, which was a broader age range than the 1864 Confederate conscription act. Anyone who did not report for State Troops service would be imprisoned, court-martialed, and forced to serve in the army for 1 year. Confederate General William L. Brandon, who was responsible for conscription in Mississippi, complained about the Governor's actions which undermined the enrollment of Confederate conscripts: "This action of the Governor has virtually arrested the volunteer enrollment of the reserves and the conscription of the men of the military age. All are rushing into the State organization, greatly to the detriment of the service...No punishment inflicted and no discipline and order kept up, the men going and coming when they please, I fancy the [State Troops] organization will be but little better than an armed mob."

From these men assembled for State Troops service in 1864, 3 regiments of infantry, 1 battalion of infantry, 4 cavalry regiments and 3 battalions of cavalry were organized. Most of the 1864 units saw little serious action, the more effective cavalry units had already been reassigned to Confederate service under Gholson's brigade earlier in the year. At this stage the military situation was increasingly desperate, and in November, 1864 Governor Clark wrote to Major-General Dabney H. Maury complaining that the state didn't have money to pay the State Troops and could not provide them with supplies. What little organization remained of the Mississippi State Troops dissolved entirely when Confederate forces in the Western Theater surrendered on May 4, 1865.

== 1864 infantry units ==
First Regiment, Infantry, Col. William S. Patton, Lt. Col. Samuel M. Meek. Organized August 24, 1864. 9 companies from Kemper, Noxubee, Lowndes, Winston, Leake, and Neshoba Counties.

Second Regiment, Infantry, Col. Greene C. Chandler, Lt. Col. William L. Cole. Organized September 2, 1864.

- Company A, Enterprise and Macon
- Company B, Wayne County
- Company C, Macon
- Company D, Paulding
- Company E, Jasper County
- Company F, Clarke County
- Company G, Starkville
- Company H, Macon
- Company I, Ruckersville
- Company K, Monroe City
- Company L, Jasper City
- Company M, Oktibbeha
- Company O, Jones County

Third Regiment, Infantry, Col. James Summerville, Lt. Col. William Buckner, 10 companies.

First Battalion, Infantry, Lt. Col. J.Y. Harper. Organized August 20–31, 1864, 8 companies.

== 1864 Cavalry units ==
First Regiment, Cavalry Col. Hezekiah William Foote, Lt. Col. W.P. Malone. 11 companies, organized summer 1864.

Second Regiment, Cavalry Co. J.L.J Hill, Lt. Col. Merriman Pounds, organized 13 September 1864.

Third Regiment, Cavalry Col. W.K. Easterling. Organized August 30, 1864. 10 companies.

Fourth Regiment, Cavalry Col. E.S. Fisher, Lt. Col. A.S. Pass. Organized September 6, 1864. 11 companies.

First Battalion, Cavalry Maj. John. E. McNair. Organized September 1864. 5 companies.

Third Battalion, Cavalry Capt. D.G. Cooper. 4 companies.

Pettus's Battalion, Cavalry Maj. John J. Pettus (former Governor of Mississippi), organized September 1864. 4 companies.

Unattached cavalry companies led by:

- Capt. W.A.J. Boon
- Capt. H.H. Gavin
- Capt. W.G. Grace
- Capt. F.M. Shields
- Capt. John Kelly
- Capt. W.G. Caperton
- Capt. C.M. Doss

== State Troop Reserves ==
Reserve State Troop units were also organized in 1864 consisting of elderly men and teenage boys who would normally be underage or overage for military service:

- First Regiment Reserves. Col. Jules C. Denis. Lt. Col. D.W. Metts. Organized August, 1864. Six companies.
- Gamblin's Cavalry, Capt. E.D. Gamblin, organized April 30, 1864
- Capt. Morphis’ Scouts
- Peyton's Battalion. Maj. E.A. Peyton.
- Little's Company. Capt. Francis M. Little.
- Yerger's Company. Capt. W.B. Yerger. Organized April 5, 1864.
- Stubb's Battalion. Lt. Col. George W. Stubbs.
- Montgomery's Scouts. Capt. W.A. Montgomery.
- Second Battalion, State Cavalry. Maj. W.E. Montgomery.

== Legacy ==
Although the State Troops were criticized as ineffective during the war by newspapers and military authorities, and despite serving as a haven for men seeking to avoid conscription into the Confederate Army, in the post-war years the memory of the Mississippi State Troops was transformed to remember them as Confederate patriots by proponents of Lost Cause mythology. State Troops service was conflated with Confederate service by the family members of State Troops veterans, and many gravestones of State Troops soldiers inaccurately describe these men as Confederate soldiers. Lost Cause organizations such as the United Daughters of the Confederacy and the Sons of Confederate Veterans accept an ancestor's service in the State Troops to qualify for membership, despite the fact that most State Troops units were never part of the Confederate army, and many men deserted or only served begrudgingly in Mississippi's state military. The complex motivations surrounding service in the State Troops, their dysfunctional history as a military organization, and the reluctance of many men to serve is often ignored, and State Troops veterans are often simply remembered as "Southern Patriots".

== Leadership ==
Commanding officers of the Mississippi State Troops:

- Major General Tullius C. Tupper (1862–1863), resigned April 1863.
- Major General Samuel J. Gholson (1863–1864), transferred to Confederate service May 22, 1864.

Brigadier Generals:

- Micajah F. Berry
- Benjamin M. Bradford
- Reuben Davis (June - August 1862), resigned.
- James Z. George (October 1862 – November 1863), resigned and rejoined Confederate Army.
- Charles E. Smedes
- Richard H. Winter

Adjutant general: Jones S. Hamilton
Chief of Ordnance, Pierre S. Layton, resigned October 1862, joined Confederate Army.
Quartermaster general, A.M. West
