= Hendley S. Bennett =

American politician

Member of the U.S. House of Representatives from Mississippi's 2nd district
- In office March 4, 1855 – March 3, 1857

Personal details
- Born: April 7, 1807 near Franklin, Tennessee, U.S.
- Died: December 15, 1891 (aged 84) Franklin, Tennessee
- Party: Democratic

Military service
- Allegiance: CSA
- Branch/service: Confederate States Army
- Years of service: 1861–1862
- Unit: 32nd Texas Cavalry Regiment
- Battles/wars: American Civil War

Hendley Stone Bennett (April 7, 1807 – December 15, 1891) was a slave owner and U.S. Representative from Mississippi.

== Biography ==
Born near Franklin, Tennessee, Bennett attended the public schools in West Point, Mississippi. He studied law. He was admitted to the bar in 1830 and commenced practice in Columbus, Mississippi. He served as judge of the circuit court 1846–1854.

Bennett was elected as a Democrat to the Thirty-fourth Congress (March 4, 1855 – March 4, 1857). He was an unsuccessful candidate for renomination in 1856. He resumed the practice of law in Columbus. He moved to Paris, Texas, in 1859 and continued the practice of law. He served as a captain in Company G of the 32nd Texas Cavalry Regiment in the Confederate States Army, from August 5, 1861, to August 31, 1862. He resumed the practice of law. In 1886, he returned to Franklin, Tennessee, and continued the practicing law. He died in Franklin on December 15, 1891. He was interred in Mount Hope Cemetery.

U.S. House of Representatives
Preceded by William T. S. Barry	Member of the U.S. House of Representatives from Mississippi's 2nd congressional district 1855-1857	Succeeded by Reuben Davis
