= Jeptha Vining Harris (Mississippi general) =

Politician and militia officer (1816–1899)

- Born: December 1, 1816; Elbert County, Georgia
- Died: November 21, 1899 (aged 82); Lowndes County, Mississippi
- Burial place: Columbus, Mississippi
- Military career
- Allegiance: Confederate States of America
- Branch: Mississippi State Troops
- Service years: 1861–1865
- Rank: Brigadier General
- Conflicts: American Civil War

Jeptha Vining Harris (December 1, 1816 – November 21, 1899) was a brigadier general (August 1862 – August 1863) and later, after a year in private life, a colonel (August 1864 – 1865) in the Mississippi State Troops, who fought in conjunction with the Confederate States Army in Mississippi during the American Civil War (Civil War). His militia brigade served at Vicksburg, Mississippi during the Siege of Vicksburg. Harris and the brigade were part of the Confederate army surrendered to Union Army forces under then Major General Ulysses S. Grant on July 4, 1863. After being exchanged in July and mustered out in August, 1863, Harris returned to civilian life. On August 26, 1864, Harris was commissioned as a colonel of militia and given command of forces at Macon, Mississippi.

After graduating from the University of Georgia in 1836, Harris moved to Lowndes County, Mississippi in 1840 where he became a slaveholder and wealthy planter. He was a state militia officer before the Civil War. He was a Mississippi State Senator from Lowndes County in 1858–1861. After the war, he lived on his Lowndes County farm until his death in 1899.

== Early life ==
Jeptha Vining Harris was born in Elbert County, Georgia on December 1, 1816. His parents were Jeptha Vining and Sarah (Hunt) Harris. The elder Jeptha Vining Harris was a Georgia militia general during the War of 1812, prominent lawyer, planter and state representative.

Jeptha Vining Harris graduated from the University of Georgia in 1836. He moved to Lowndes County, Mississippi in 1840 where he became a slaveholder and wealthy planter. He was a state militia officer before the Civil War. He served in the Mississippi State Senate from Lowndes County in 1858–1861.

Jeptha V. Harris married Mary Oliver Banks of Tuscaloosa, Alabama on June 30, 1840. They had the following children who survived to adulthood: Mary O. Harris, Willis Banks Harris (who served on the staff of Confederate Brigadier General Jacob H. Sharp) and Lucy Harris Duncan. Harris was the uncle of Jeptha Vining Harris, a doctor who served in the Confederate States Army and was later a doctor, customs collector and school superintendent at Key West, Florida.

== American Civil War service ==
At the outbreak of the Civil War, at his own expense, Jeptha Vining Harris equipped a company of soldiers for the Confederate Army. In August 1861 or 1862, Harris joined the Mississippi militia and was elected captain of a company. On September 2, 1862, he was commissioned a brigadier general of Mississippi State Troops posted at Columbus, Mississippi. On May 7, 1863, Harris's brigade was ordered to defend the riverfront at the besieged Confederate stronghold of Vicksburg, Mississippi. The unit was positioned on the far left of the Confederate line east of Fort Hill under the overall command of Brigadier General John C. Vaughn. Harris was praised for his performance at Vicksburg. Harris and his brigade were surrendered with the other Confederate forces at Vicksburg on July 4, 1863.

After the Confederate surrender at Vicksburg, Harris and his men were paroled. Many of the demoralized men went home. Harris was exchanged on July 16, 1863, but his command had dissolved and both Harris and his brigade were formally mustered out on August 26, 1863. On August 26, 1864, Harris was appointed a colonel and given command of the militia force at Macon, Mississippi, where he completed his war service.

== Aftermath ==
After the Civil War, Jeptha V. Harris returned to his farm in Lowndes County, Mississippi, where he died on November 21, 1899. He is buried in Friendship Cemetery, Columbus, Mississippi.

== See also ==
- List of American Civil War generals (Acting Confederate)
