= Jeptha Vining Harris (Georgia general) =

American politician

- Born: April 27, 1782; Wilkes County, Georgia
- Died: 1856 (Aged 73/74); Marietta, Georgia
- Burial place: Marietta, Georgia
- Military career
- Allegiance: United States of America
- Branch: Georgia militia
- Service years: 1812-1845
- Rank: Major General
- Conflicts: War of 1812
- Other work: Lawyer, University of Georgia trustee, State Representative, State Senator

Jeptha Vining Harris (April 27, 1782 – 1856) was a brigadier general in the Georgia militia during the War of 1812. He was a lawyer and wealthy plantation owner, who served in the Georgia General Assembly as both a representative and senator. Harris was also a trustee of the University of Georgia from 1832 to 1856. He was the father of Jeptha Vining Harris (Mississippi general), a Mississippi (Confederate) brigadier general during the American Civil War (Civil War). He was the grandfather of Dr. Jeptha Vining Harris, who served as a doctor with the Confederate States Army and was a doctor, customs collector and school superintendent in Key West, Florida after the Civil War.

== Biography ==
=== Early years ===
Jeptha Vining Harris was born on 27 April 1782 in Wilkes County, Georgia. He was the eleventh and youngest child of Walton Harris and his wife Rebecca (Lanier) Harris. Harris graduated with first honors in the first class of the University of Georgia, in 1804. On October 11, 1804, Harris married Sarah Hunt (15 June 1789 – 1871), daughter of Richardson Hunt (1762-1813), of Elbert County, Georgia. Jeptha and Sarah Harris had twelve children, six sons and six daughters, all of whom survived to adulthood, married and had a family. All six of Harris' sons graduated from the University of Georgia.

=== Law career ===
Jeptha V. Harris lived in Clarke, Elbert, and Morgan Counties. The Harris family also lived for a time in Oglethorpe County, Georgia. They moved to Athens, Georgia where Harris practiced law for many years. Of his law practice in the Northern Judicial Circuit, it is said that he became "a distinguished lawyer of the Georgia bar."

=== Legislative service and Georgia Militia ===
Harris became a prominent lawyer, planter and member of the Georgia House of Representatives, representing Elbert County in 1811 and 1812.

On December 3, 1812, the governor commissioned Harris Brigadier general of the 1st Brigade of the 4th Division of the Georgia Militia, replacing Allen Daniel. After the war, Harris represented Elbert County in the Georgia Senate, 1825. He was promoted to Major general of the 4th Division on 9 November 1829, resigning his commission in 1845.

== Personal life and family ==
Harris accumulated a large fortune and eventually retired to a home near Marietta, Georgia.

Harris was the father of Jeptha Vining Harris, a Mississippi (Confederate) brigadier general during the American Civil War. He was the grandfather of Dr. Jeptha Vining Harris of South Carolina, Mississippi and Florida, who served as a doctor with the Confederate States Army and was a doctor, customs collector and school superintendent in Key West, Florida for many years after the Civil War.

Another son, William Littleton Harris (1807-1868), graduated from the University of Georgia in 1825. He became a lawyer, and about 1836 moved from Washington, Georgia, to Columbus, Mississippi. He served as judge of the Circuit Court, and subsequently became a justice of the Mississippi Supreme Court, despite the fact that he "shunned politics." He also declined an appointment to the United States Supreme Court. He died in Memphis, Tennessee, on 26 November 1868.

== Death ==
General Harris died at his home, in Cobb County on 29 June 1856, and was buried in Old Madison Cemetery in Madison, Georgia.

Of General Harris, Garnett Andrews said "he was a fine old gentleman with a fine family, of great wealth and greater hospitality." General Harris was the source of Garnett Andrews' information about George Cook and the origins of the Troup and Clark factions that dominated Georgia politics for so many years.
