= Army of 10,000 =

Mississippi military unit during the American Civil War

- Active: 1861–1862
- Disbanded: February, 1862
- Allegiance: Mississippi
- Type: Infantry and cavalry
- Campaigns: American Civil War; Confederate occupation of Kentucky

Commanders
- Notable commanders: James L. Alcorn; Reuben Davis

The Army of 10,000 was a hastily assembled volunteer unit of Mississippi troops in the American Civil War sent to support Confederate forces in Kentucky during the winter of 1861-1862. Despite the name, this organization amounted to less than 5,000 troops. Volunteers enlisted in the Army for a 60-day term of service, and after performing garrison duty in Kentucky, they were sent home in February 1862 and disbanded.

== History ==
In response to a call for support from Confederate General Albert Sidney Johnston, Mississippi Governor John J. Pettus asked for 10,000 volunteers to enlist in the Army on September 28, 1861. Since the entire pre-war US Army only numbered 16,000 troops, this would have been a considerable force to be fielded by a single state. No volunteers were sent in September, but a large number of donated firearms were assembled at state armories. In November, Johnston repeated his request, and Governor Pettus again called on the state to supply 10,000 men. The Mississippi Legislature appropriated $500,000 for this purpose and authorized the governor to appoint generals to lead this force. Brigadier Generals Reuben Davis and James L. Alcorn of the state militia were tasked with organizing the Army. Volunteers began assemble at Corinth and Grenada for 60 days military service, with the men supplying all of their own weapons and equipment.

Before even half of the quota of 10,000 men could be filled, those volunteers who had arrived at the training camps were quickly sent north. General Davis arrived at Bowling Green, Kentucky, on December 16 with 1,762 infantry and 533 cavalry troops. General Alcorn assembled a force of 1,850 infantry and 56 cavalry, arriving at Columbus, Kentucky on December 21. Alcorn was dismissive of the effectiveness of his troops, calling them "inexperienced shot-gun militia", and indeed, most of the men were armed with shotguns they had brought from home rather than military-standard weapons.

The Army of 10,000 was assembled in a hasty manner, without adequate supply or organization, and the chain of command they were to follow was unclear. Generals Davis & Alcorn were commissioned in the Mississippi militia rather than the Confederate army, and their troops were nominally under the control of the Governor of Mississippi. General Alcorn resisted taking orders from Confederate generals, he wrote to Confederate General Simon Buckner, arguing that "My service as brigadier-general of Mississippi is due that State only."

The volunteers in Kentucky did not see combat, but they were exposed to severe winter weather and suffered from outbreaks of disease in their camps at Bowling Green and Camp Beauregard near Columbus. Confederate General Leonidas Polk wrote to the Governor in January asking that the Army of 10,000 not be sent home, but this request was ignored and the army began returning to Mississippi at the end of January 1862. General Johnston's Confederate forces would retreat from Kentucky soon afterwards. The Army of 10,000 returned to its training camps in February, 1862, and was disbanded as the volunteers' 60-day term of service had ended. After the Army was disbanded, the state militia was reorganized as the Mississippi State Troops, but tensions would remain between Governor Pettus' desire to maintain Mississippi troops under his direct control for home defense, and the Confederate government's demand for as many men as possible to join the regular army.

== Organization ==
General Alcorn's Brigade:

- First Infantry Regiment - Col. W.A. Percy, Lt. Col. A.P. Hill, P. Brent
- Second Infantry Regiment - Col. A.W. Bartlett, Lt. Col. W.F. Paine
- Third Infantry Regiment - Col. B.S. Rozell, Lt. Col. D.S. Comfort
- Cavalry Company, "Mississippi Scouts" - Capt. Cornelius McLaurin.

General Davis' Brigade:

- Fourth Infantry Regiment - Col. Mark P. Lowrey, Lt. Col. M.B. Buchanan
- Fifth Infantry Regiment - Col. William S. Patton, Lt. Col. S.M. Meek
- First Battalion - Maj. Newton J. Beckett

The unit designations (First Regiment, Second Regiment, etc.) were later reused by other Mississippi regiments in Confederate service as well as units of the Mississippi State Troops after the Army of 10,000 was disbanded. Most of the men joined regular Confederate regiments after the Army returned to Mississippi.

General Alcorn signed his dispatches from Kentucky as the "Army of Mississippi", but the Army of 10,000 should not be confused with later Confederate organizations of the same name.

== See also ==
List of Mississippi Civil War Confederate units
