= Jeptha Vining Harris (doctor) =

American Confederate surgeon

- Born: May 28, 1839; Abbeville County, South Carolina
- Died: 1914 (Aged 74/75); Key West, Florida
- Burial place: Key West, Florida
- Military career
- Allegiance: Confederate States of America
- Branch: Confederate States Army; Confederate States Navy
- Rank: Assistant Surgeon
- Conflicts: American Civil War
- Other work: Doctor, customs collector, school superintendent

Jeptha Vining Harris (May 27, 1839 – 1914) was an assistant surgeon for the Confederate States Army and Confederate States Navy during the American Civil War. After the Civil War, he was a customs collector, doctor and school superintendent at Key West, Florida.

== Biography ==
Jeptha Vining Harris was born on May 27, 1839, in the Abbeville District of South Carolina. He was the sixth child of James Walton Harris and Martha Watkins Harris. James Walton Harris was the first child of Jeptha Vining Harris of Georgia and Sarah Hunt Harris.

Jeptha V. Harris grew up in North Carolina and Mississippi. Harris was the nephew of Jeptha Vining Harris (Mississippi general), a Mississippi militia (Confederate) brigadier general during the American Civil War (Civil War) and Mississippi State Senator. He was the grandson of Jeptha Vining Harris (Georgia general) and Sarah (Hunt) Harris. The elder Jeptha Vining Harris was a Georgia militia general during the War of 1812, prominent lawyer, planter and member of the Georgia House of Representatives.

Harris received his college and medical education at the University of Mississippi, graduating in 1859.

Jeptha V. Harris married Mary Louise Perkins of Lowndes, Mississippi on March 5, 1861. They had the following children: Marian Harris, Jeptha Vining Harris Jr., Louis Allen Harris and Martha Watkins Harris. Both sons were lawyers.

Soon after he completed college and medical school, Harris served as an assistant surgeon in the Confederate States Army and Confederate States Navy during the American Civil War.

After the Civil War, Harris and his family moved to Key West, Florida, where he became customs collector and lived in the Customs House. He also resumed his medical practice.

Harris was interested in promoting and improving public education. Because of this interest, he became school superintendent at Key West. Harris School, which was built at Key West in 1909, was named for him.

== Death ==
Doctor Jeptha Vining Harris died November 16, 1916, and is buried in Key West Cemetery, Key West Florida.
