= 58th United States Colored Infantry Regiment =

- Active: 1863–1866
- Country: United States
- Allegiance: United States Union
- Branch: Infantry; United States Colored Troops
- Size: Regiment
- Engagements: American Civil War

The 58th United States Colored Infantry was an infantry regiment that served in the Union Army during the American Civil War. Originally organized as the 6th Mississippi Infantry (African Descent) on August 27, 1863, the regiment was redesignated as the 58th USCT Infantry on March 11, 1864. The regiment was composed of African American enlisted men from Mississippi commanded by white officers.

== History ==
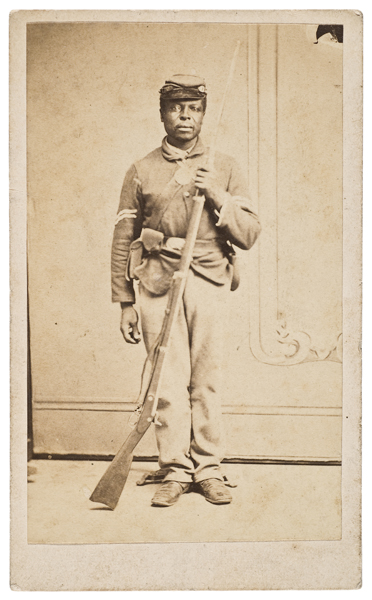
Tom Dare, 58th USCT Infantry.

The 6th Regiment, Mississippi Volunteers (African Descent) was organized on August 27, 1863, at Natchez, Mississippi. Most of the soldiers were former slaves from Mississippi who had escaped to Union lines. The first colonel of the Regiment was Absalom S. Smith, formerly of the 14th Wisconsin. All officers of the United States Colored Troops during the Civil War were white, Black soldiers would not be commissioned as officers in the US Army until after the war. Col. Smith was dismissed from the service in January 1864, and Simon Manly Preston became the regiment's colonel.

The regiment was posted on garrison duty at Natchez for most of the war. Newly-recruited units of Black troops were used to garrison strategic points along the Mississippi River, freeing up veteran Union troops for service elsewhere. By the summer of 1864, the majority of the 5,000 Union troops garrisoning Natchez were from Colored Troops regiments.

A detachment of the 6th Mississippi Regiment was sent on a scouting expedition on November 11, 1863, when they were fired on by Confederate cavalry 2 miles outside of Natchez. The Union troops drove off the attack, but suffered 4 killed and 6 wounded in the skirmish.

The regiment was redesignated as the 58th USCT Infantry on March 11, 1864. An inspection report from July 1864 detailed the Regiment's condition: "the FIFTY- eighth U. S. Infantry (Colored). Aggregate effective strength at the post, 674. They were armed with new Springfield muskets, and they were in fine condition. A few cartridge-boxes and bayonet scabbards were wanting, but otherwise the equipment was good. Many haversacks and canteens wanting, owing to articles having been destroyed in the post hospital. Sanitary condition good; discipline good; instruction fair; officers good. As soon as it can be relieved from its constant fatigue and working parties on fortifications, etc., and can have time for instruction and drill, it promises to make a fine regiment."

Following the good inspection report in July, the 58th Regiment, along with the white 29th Illinois Infantry, was designated as the Natchez reserve force to be "constantly held in readiness to move by land or water at an hour's notice". Although by 1864 the Union Army controlled all the major strategic points along the Mississippi River, Confederate cavalry still roamed the countryside, looting plantations and skirmishing with Union troops. In early August, the 58th was sent on an expedition to the Louisiana side of the Mississippi River in search of Confederates. Troops from the 29th Illinois and the 4th Illinois Cavalry accompanied the 58th, disembarking at Vidalia, Louisiana and marching over swampy terrain towards Trinity, Louisiana. On August 5, the Union forces clashed with a Confederate force near the Gillespie plantation, with a small number killed and wounded on each side.

The 58th spent the remainder of the war at Natchez, and mustered out of service on March 8, 1866.

There is currently an effort underway to raise funds for a monument to the US Colored Troops who served at Natchez, including the 58th.

Combat casualties of the 58th Regiment: 4 killed, 6 wounded, 1 missing at Natchez (November 1863).

== Commanders ==
Commanders of the 58th USCT Infantry:

- Col. Absalom S. Smith, dismissed from service 1864.
- Col. Simon Manly Preston
- Lt. Col. Norman S. Gilson
- Lt. Col. Samuel A, Harrison, resigned 1864.

== See also ==
- List of United States Colored Troops Civil War Units
- United States Colored Troops
- List of Mississippi Union Civil War units
