= Benjamin G. Humphreys =

American politician

Benjamin Humphreys
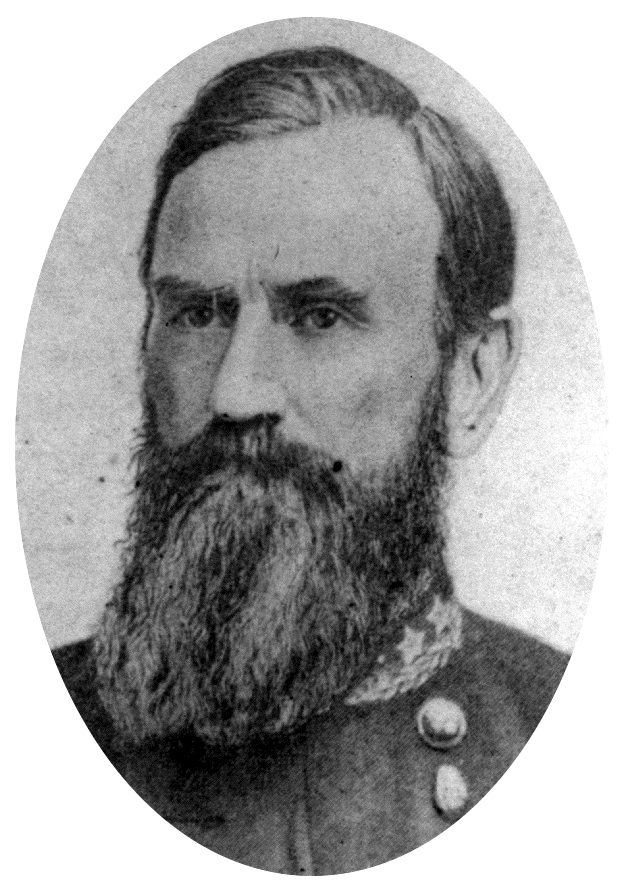

26th Governor of Mississippi
- In office October 16, 1865 – June 15, 1868
- Preceded by: William L. Sharkey
- Succeeded by: Adelbert Ames

Member of the Mississippi Senate
- In office 1839–1844

Personal details
- Born: August 26, 1808 Claiborne County, Mississippi Territory, U.S.
- Died: December 20, 1882 (aged 74) Jackson, Mississippi, U.S.
- Party: Democratic

Military service
- Allegiance: United States; Confederate States of America
- Branch/service: Confederate States Army
- Years of service: 1861–65
- Rank: Brigadier General
- Commands: 21st Mississippi Infantry Regiment; Humphreys' Brigade
- Battles/wars: American Civil War: Peninsula Campaign; Battle of Antietam; Battle of Chancellorsville; Battle of Gettysburg; Battle of Chickamauga; Knoxville Campaign; Overland Campaign; Battle of Berryville

Benjamin Grubb Humphreys (August 26, 1808 – December 20, 1882) was an American politician from Mississippi. He was a general in the Confederate States Army during the American Civil War and served as the governor of Mississippi from 1865 to 1868, during Reconstruction.

== Early life ==
Humphreys was born in Claiborne County in the Territory of Mississippi, on the Bayou Pierre. He was educated in New Jersey and enrolled at United States Military Academy in the same class as Robert E. Lee and Joseph E. Johnston. However, he was expelled in 1826 when he participated in a "Christmas frolic" that ended up turning into the Eggnog Riot.

In 1832, Humphreys married Marry McLaughlin, who died in 1835, and in 1839 he married his second wife Mildred Hickman. He was elected to the Mississippi Legislature representing his native county, serving in the House in 1839 and the state Senate from 1840 to 1844. In 1846, he moved to Sunflower County, Mississippi, and founded Itta Bena. He developed a cotton plantation there.

== Civil War ==
During the American Civil War, Humphreys raised a company, the "Sunflower Guards" and was commissioned a captain in the Confederate States Army in 1861. Part of the 21st Mississippi Infantry Regiment, he was elected to the rank of colonel the same year and brigaded with other regiments under the command of Brig. Gen. William Barksdale in the Eastern Theater. At the Battle of Gettysburg in 1863, Humphreys' regiment was part of the force that attacked U.S. Army positions at the Peach Orchard, driving the U.S. soldiers back toward Cemetery Ridge. Humphreys took command of the brigade, consisting of the 13th, 17th, 18th and 21st Mississippi Regiments after the death of Barksdale. He was subsequently promoted to brigadier general, and remained in command of his brigade until he was wounded in the Battle of Berryville, Virginia, on September 3, 1864. Humphreys returned home to Mississippi to heal but could not return to active duty before the war ended.

== Political career ==
The Confederate surrender in 1865 was followed by Reconstruction of state governments. Secessionist officials and military officers were forbidden to hold public office in the United States unless pardoned. Benjamin Humphreys was unpardoned when he announced his candidacy for Mississippi governor as a Democrat. President Andrew Johnson did not want him elected and refused to pardon him. Humphreys persisted in his candidacy, won the election on October 2, 1865, and was inaugurated and sworn in as Governor on October 16. On October 26, provisional Governor William L. Sharkey received from President Johnson a pardon for Humphreys. Humphreys won re-election to a second term in 1868.

However, Republicans in Congress took control of Reconstruction, and on June 15, he was physically removed from office by soldiers of the U.S. Army.

As a Democratic Governor of the State of Mississippi, he professed the ideology of White supremacy. In his own words:

The Negro is free, whether we like it or not; we must realize that fact now and forever. To be free, however, does not make him a citizen, or entitle him to political or social equality with the white race.

After he retired from politics, Humphreys entered a career in insurance in Jackson, Mississippi. He continued there until his retirement in 1877, when he moved to his plantation in Leflore County, Mississippi, where he died in 1882. He is buried in Wintergreen Cemetery, Port Gibson, Mississippi.

Humphreys County, Mississippi, is named after him. His son, Benjamin G. Humphreys II, was a United States representative from Mississippi.

== See also ==
- List of American Civil War generals (Confederate)

== Notes ==
Party political offices
Preceded by John J. Pettus	Democratic nominee for Governor of Mississippi; 1865	Vacant Title next held by John Marshall Stone
Political offices
Preceded by William L. Sharkey	Governor of Mississippi; 1865–1868	Succeeded by Adelbert Ames
