= William S. Patton =

American politician

William S. Patton (June 20, 1813 – July 5, 1889) was an American politician who served as the Speaker of the Mississippi House of Representatives between 1852 and 1854.

Patton was born on June 20, 1813, in Wayne County, Mississippi. Patton went to LaGrange College around 1831. In 1844, Patton was elected to the Alabama House of Representatives. In 1848, Patton moved to Mississippi. In 1851, Patton was elected to the Mississippi House of Representatives. Between 1852 and 1854, Patton served as speaker of the Mississippi House of Representatives.

During the American Civil War, Patton served in the Confederate Army, as part of Fifth Regiment in the Army of 10,000, and later the 37th Mississippi Infantry Regiment. Patton had the rank of colonel by the end of the war.

Patton died on July 5, 1889.
