= Charles Clark (Mississippi politician) =

24th governor of Mississippi

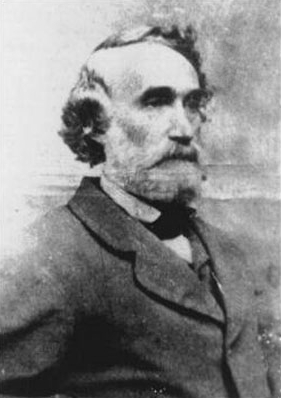

24th Governor of Mississippi
- In office November 16, 1863 – May 22, 1865
- Preceded by: John Pettus
- Succeeded by: William Sharkey

Member of the Mississippi House of Representatives
- In office 1838–1844
- In office 1856–1861

Personal details
- Born: May 24, 1811 Cincinnati, Ohio
- Died: December 18, 1877 (aged 66) Bolivar County, Mississippi
- Resting place: Bolivar County, Mississippi
- Party: Democratic
- Spouse: Ann Darden
- Education: Augusta College
- Profession: Teacher, lawyer

Military service
- Branch: United States Army; Confederate States Army
- Years of service: 1847–1848 (U.S.); 1861–1863 (C.S.)
- Rank: Colonel (U.S.); Brigadier-General (C.S.)
- Battles: Mexican–American War; American Civil War; Battle of Shiloh (WIA); Siege of Corinth; Battle of Baton Rouge (WIA) (POW)

Charles Clark (May 24, 1811 – December 18, 1877) was the 24th governor of Mississippi from 1863 to 1865. A wealthy planter, slaveholder, and lawyer, Clark served as a soldier in the Mexican-American War and joined the Confederate army as a general during the American Civil War. Severely wounded in battle, he ran for governor of Mississippi in 1863, serving in office until the final Confederate defeat in the spring of 1865.

== Early life and education ==
Clark was born in Cincinnati, Ohio, on May 24, 1811, and subsequently moved to Mississippi. He is the great-grandfather of Judge Charles Clark, who served on the United States Court of Appeals for the Fifth Circuit from 1969 to 1992 and was the chair of the United States Judicial Conference.

In the late 1830s and early 1840s, Clark, a lawyer, represented a settler in a dispute with some Choctaw Native Americans over land in the Mississippi Delta. The dispute led to a series of lawsuits before the Mississippi Supreme Court. The settler ultimately prevailed and gave Clark a large tract of land between Beulah, Mississippi and the Mississippi River as his legal fee. In the late 1840s, Clark formed a plantation there, worked by slave labor. He named his plantation Doe-Roe, pseudonyms commonly used in the legal profession to represent unnamed or unknown litigants (e.g., John Doe, Roe v. Wade). However, because of poor local literacy, the plantation became known by its phonic representation, Doro. According to archives at Delta State University, "The plantation grew to over 5,000 acres (20 km^{2}) and became the most prosperous in the region, operating until 1913. It was prominent in the social, political and economic affairs of Bolivar County." He was also active in state politics, being elected as a member of the Mississippi House of Representatives several times.

== Military service ==
During the Mexican–American War, Clark raised a company of volunteer infantry to join the US invasion of Mexico. Initially elected captain, Clark was later promoted to colonel in the 2nd Mississippi Rifles. His unit reached Monterrey, Mexico but suffered major losses due to disease, Clark was sent back to Mississippi to enlist new recruits and he did not see combat during the course of the Mexican War.

Following the secession of Mississippi in January 1861, Clark was elected as a brigadier general of Mississippi's state armed forces. He was then quickly promoted to Major General, following the selection of the initial choice of Major General, Jefferson Davis, as Confederate President. Clark oversaw the deployment of Mississippi troops to Pensacola, Florida and the mustering of regiments into Confederate service, but on May 22 he received a commission as a brigadier general in the Confederate States Army and left his Mississippi post.

Clark commanded a brigade at engagements in Kentucky and then a division under Leonidas Polk at the Battle of Shiloh, where he was wounded in the shoulder. Following the Confederate retreat into north Mississippi, he took part in the Siege of Corinth, then was tasked with leading a division at the Battle of Baton Rouge. This August 1862 Confederate attempt to recapture Louisiana's capital city failed, and Clark was severely wounded and captured. He spent time as a prisoner of war before being released on February 21, 1863, but was permanently disabled, with his femur shattered after being shot through the hip at Baton Rouge. Clark walked with crutches or a cane the rest of his life.

== Governor of Mississippi ==
John J. Pettus, the governor who led Mississippi to secede in 1861 was term-limited and could not run for reelection. Clark ran for governor in the October 1863 election on a conservative platform focused on caring for wounded soldiers and their families, as opposed to the "fire-eater" rhetoric that had led to secession after Pettus's election. Clark was elected as governor with 70% of the vote and inaugurated at Columbus on November 16. Clark's administration focused on aiding the destitute civilian population of Mississippi, officially sanctioning contraband trade with US forces in exchange for essential goods and medicine.

By the time Clark came into office, Mississippi could contribute very little to the Confederate war effort. The major strategic points were already in Union hands, and Mississippi's army regiments were away fighting in other states. As Confederate demands for manpower increased, Clark sought to maintain a local military force under his control to oppose Federal raids and maintain law and order in the face of gangs of deserters and Unionist guerillas that had effectively overthrown civil authority in several Mississippi counties. Clark argued that as governor he had the authority to enroll men into the Mississippi State Troops and exempt such men from conscription, while the Confederate government sought to draft as many of his state troops as possible and complained that the state's armed force had "no discipline and order" and were "little better than an armed mob". Despite these conflicts over manpower, Clark coordinated the actions of his state troops with General Nathan Bedford Forrest's Cavalry Corps, the last remaining considerable Confederate force based in the region. In the final days of the war, Clark and former governor of Tennessee Isham G. Harris proposed to General Forrest that they stage a fighting retreat into Texas and continue the war from there, which Forrest rejected.

With the collapse of the Confederacy in the spring of 1865, Clark was forcibly removed from office by the United States Army on May 22 and briefly imprisoned at Fort Pulaski near Savannah, Georgia. Clark was replaced as governor by William L. Sharkey, a respected judge and staunch Unionist, who had been in total opposition to secession.

Clarke was ex officio President of the University of Mississippi Board of Trustees during his tenure as Governor of Mississippi. Despite losing the governorship, he remained on the Board for almost ten years after his term ended. In 1871, he purchased Routhland, an Antebellum mansion in Natchez, Mississippi.

== Death ==
Clark died in Bolivar County, Mississippi, on December 18, 1877, and was buried at the family graveyard in that county.

== See also ==
- List of Confederate generals
- List of governors of Mississippi
- List of heads of government who were later imprisoned
