= 1853 Mississippi gubernatorial election =

- November 8, 1853
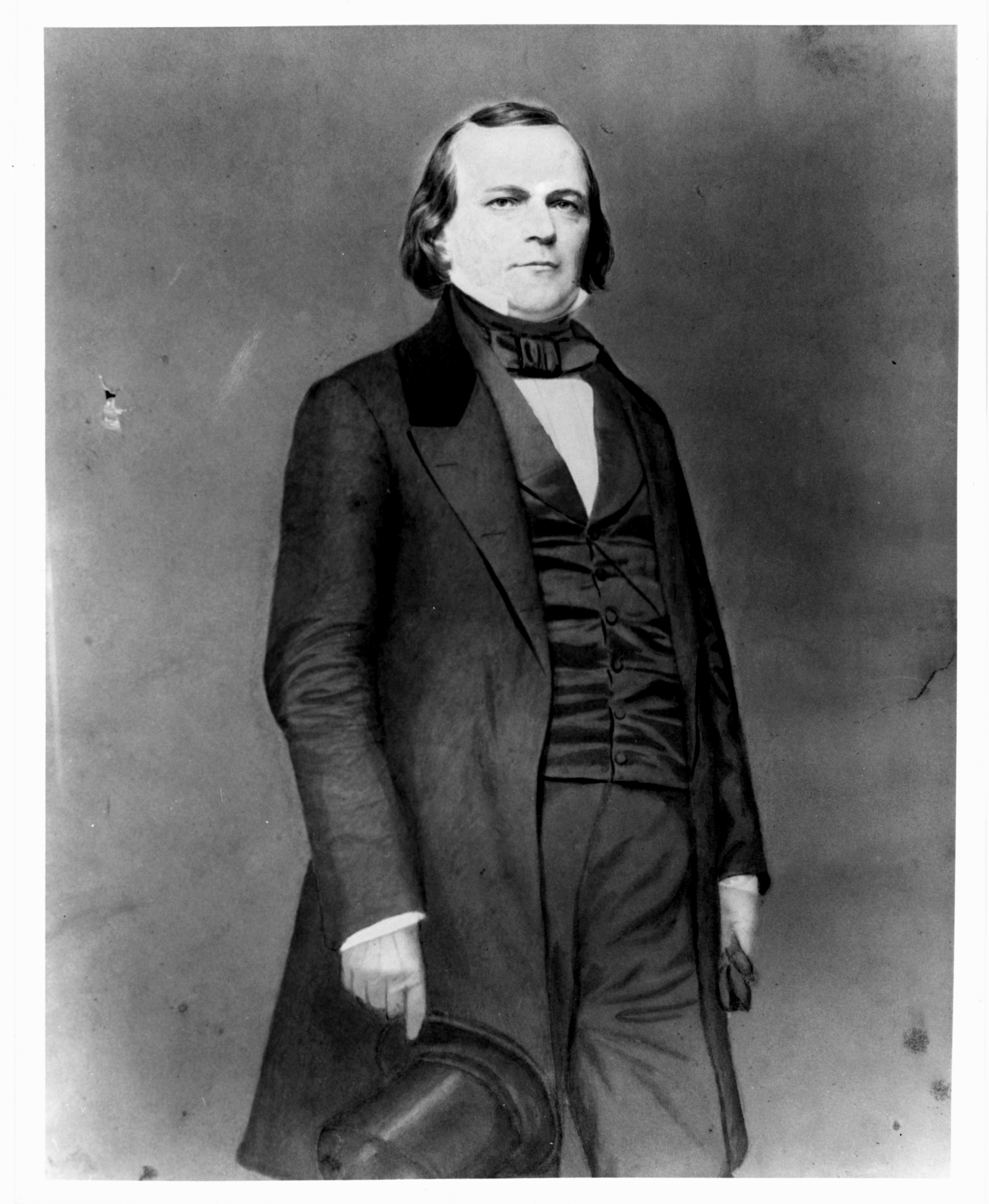

Nominee	John J. McRae	Francis M. Rogers
Party	Democratic	Whig
Popular vote	32,116	27,279
Percentage	54.07%	45.93%
- County results McRae: 50–60% 60–70% 70–80% 80–90% 90–100% Rogers: 50–60% 60–70%
Governor before election
John J. Pettus (Acting)
Democratic
Elected Governor
John J. McRae
Democratic

The 1853 Mississippi gubernatorial election was held on November 8, 1853, in order to elect the Governor of Mississippi. Former Democratic US Senator for Mississippi John J. McRae defeated the Whig nominee Francis M. Rogers.

== General election ==
On election day, November 8, 1853, John J. McRae defeated Francis M. Rogers by a margin of 4,837 votes. McRae became the 21st Governor of Mississippi, taking office on January 10, 1854. This maintained Democrat control of the office of Governor. The previous governor, Henry S. Foote, a Democrat elected for the Union Party, resigned on January 5, 1854; president of the Mississippi State Senate John J. Pettus served as governor for the intervening five days. McRae was sworn in on January 10, 1854.

=== Results ===
Mississippi gubernatorial election, 1853
Party	Candidate	Votes	%
Democratic	John J. McRae	32,116	54.07
Whig	Francis M. Rogers	27,279	45.93
Total votes		59,395	100.00
Democratic hold			
