= 1851 Mississippi gubernatorial election =

- November 4, 1851
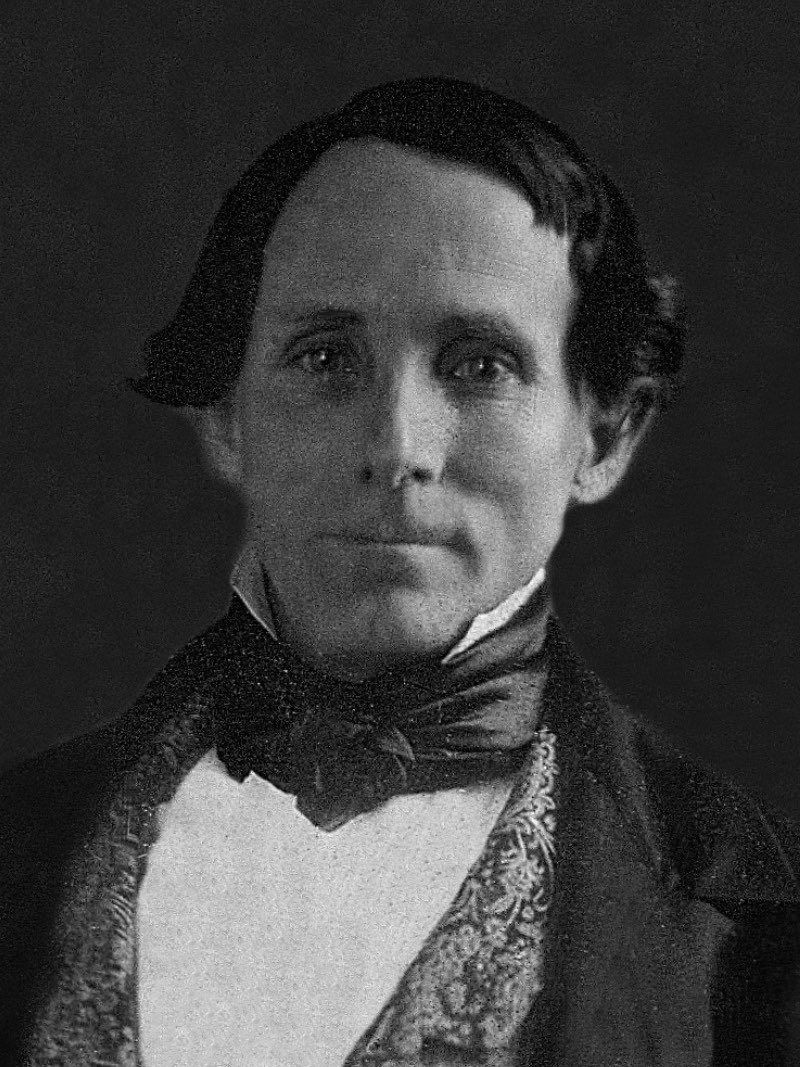

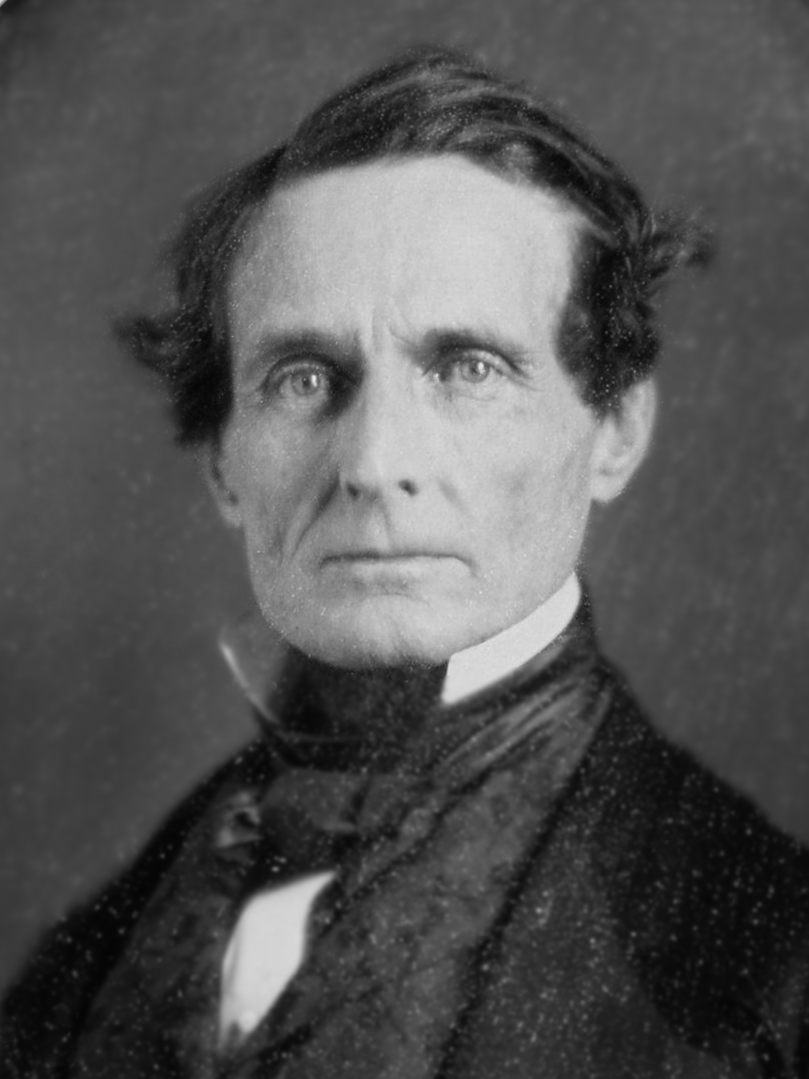
Nominee	Henry S. Foote	Jefferson Davis
Party	Union	Southern Rights
Popular vote	29,358	28,359
Percentage	50.87%	49.13%
County results
Foote
50–60%
60–70%
70–80%
Davis
50–60%
60–70%
70–80%
80–90%
Governor before election
James Whitfield
Democratic
Elected Governor
Henry S. Foote
Union

The 1851 Mississippi gubernatorial election was held on November 4, 1851, in order to elect the Governor of the U.S. state of Mississippi. Democratic US Senator for Mississippi Henry S. Foote, who ran on a Unionist platform, defeated the Southern Rights Party nominee and fellow Democratic US Senator for Mississippi before resigning on September 23, 1851, to run in the gubernatorial election, Jefferson Davis.

== General election ==
John A. Quitman had been the original candidate of the "so-called Resistance Party" but "capitalizing on the inflammatory rhetoric of Quitman, the Unionists charged with considerable justification that the governor was plotting secretly with the South Carolinians to destroy the Union." Quitman dropped out in September and handed over the party to Jefferson Davis in hopes of saving the governor's mansion, but two months of campaigning was not enough time to avert a loss.

Following the controversial Compromise of 1850, Mississippi voters considered this election to be an extension of their approval or disapproval of the compromise. Unionist Democratic Party nominee Henry S. Foote defended the compromise, while Southern Rights Party nominee Jefferson Davis campaigned vigorously against the compromise, suggesting that it put the South at a political disadvantage. The election was held during a time of increasing sectional tension in the United States; Davis voiced his concern over the alleged infringement of southern constitutional rights by the federal government. Although he only started his campaign six weeks before election day, Davis was considered the favorite to win the election. However, on election day, November 4, 1851, Foote won by a margin of 999 votes and would go on to become the 19th Governor of Mississippi. Meanwhile, Davis turned down an offer from outgoing Governor James Whitfield to be reappointed to his seat in the US senate. Davis would go on to serve as the President of the Confederacy during the civil war from 1861 to 1865.

=== Results ===
Mississippi gubernatorial election, 1851
Party	Candidate	Votes	%
Union	Henry S. Foote	29,358	50.87
Southern Rights	Jefferson Davis	28,359	49.13
Total votes		57,717	100.00
Union gain from Democratic			
