= John J. Pettus =

23rd governor of Mississippi

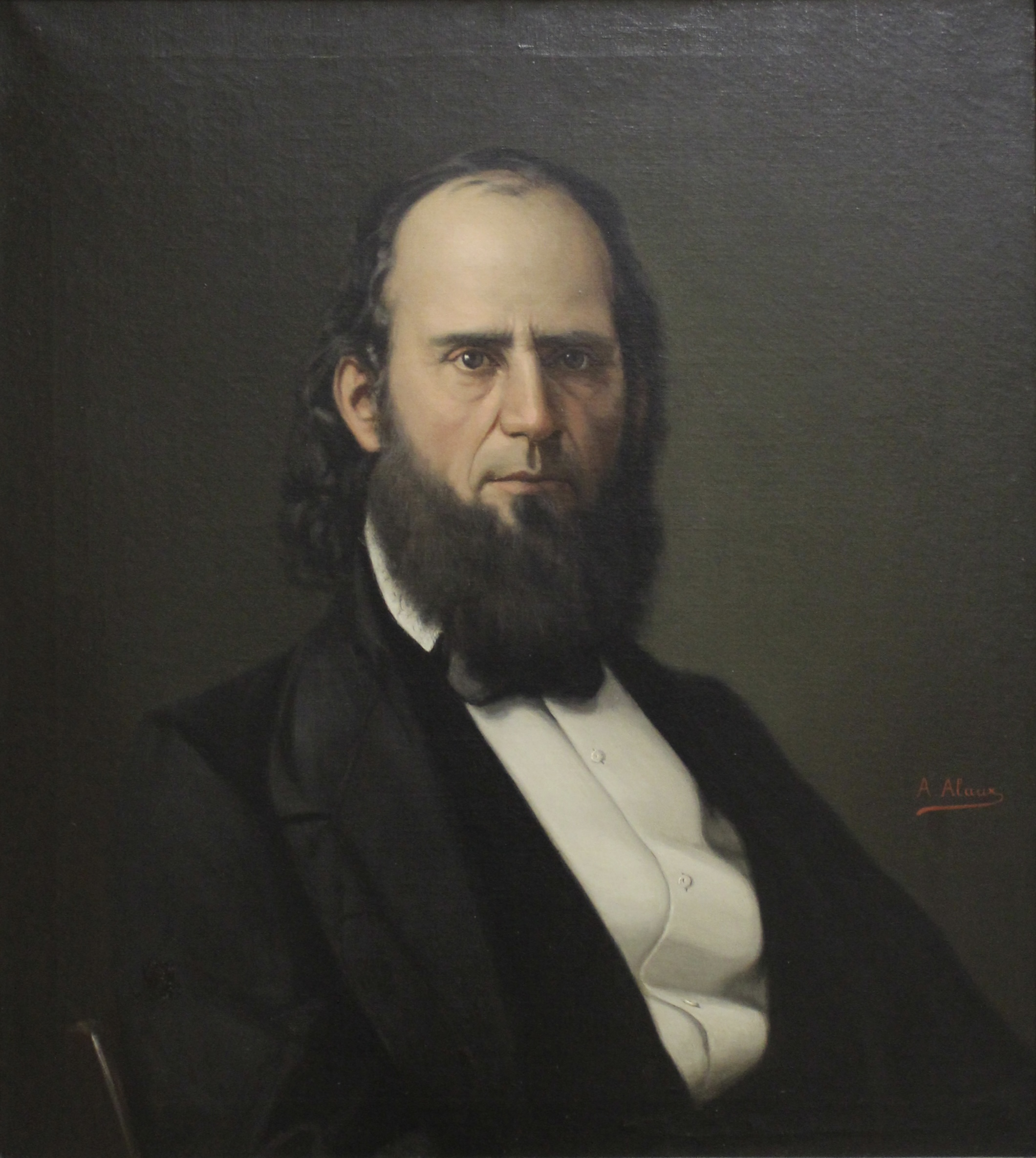
- Posthumous Portrait by Alexander Alaux, 1907 (Mississippi Department of Archives and History)

23rd Governor of Mississippi
- In office November 21, 1859 – November 16, 1863
- Preceded by: William McWillie
- Succeeded by: Charles Clark

President of the Mississippi Senate
- In office 1854–1857
- Preceded by: James Whitfield
- Succeeded by: James Drane

Governor of Mississippi
- Acting; January 5, 1854 – January 10, 1854
- Preceded by: Henry S. Foote
- Succeeded by: John J. McRae

Member of the Mississippi Senate from Neshoba and Kemper counties
- In office 1848–1857
- Preceded by: Emanuel Durr
- Succeeded by: Isaac Enloe

Member of the Mississippi House of Representatives from Kemper County
- In office 1844–1847 Serving with Lewis Stovall 1844–1845
- Preceded by: Vacant
- Succeeded by: Oswell Neely, Lumpkin Garrett

Personal details
- Born: John Jones Pettus; October 9, 1813 Wilson County, Tennessee, United States
- Died: January 25, 1867 (aged 53) Pulaski County, Arkansas, United States
- Cause of death: Pneumonia
- Resting place: Flat Bayou Cemetery, Jefferson County, Arkansas; 34°21′30.3″N 91°52′09.5″W
- Party: Democratic
- Spouses: Permelia Virginia Winston (m. 1837; died 1857) Susan Hewell (m. 1861)
- Relations: Edmund Pettus (brother)

Military service
- Allegiance: Confederate States
- Branch: Mississippi State Troops
- Years of service: 1864–1865
- Rank: Colonel
- Wars: American Civil War

John Jones Pettus (October 9, 1813 – January 25, 1867) was an American politician, lawyer, and slave owner who served as the 23rd Governor of Mississippi, from 1859 to 1863. Before being elected in his own right to full gubernatorial terms in 1859 and 1861, he served as acting governor from January 5 to 10, 1854, following the resignation of Henry S. Foote. A member of the Democratic Party, Pettus had previously been a Mississippi state representative, and a member and president of the Mississippi State Senate. He strongly supported Mississippi's secession from the United States and brought his state along as a founding member of the Confederate States of America in 1861. Pettus's term of office came to an end in 1863, the same year that saw much of Mississippi overrun by Union forces. At the close of the war he fled to Arkansas to avoid prosecution and died there in 1867.

== Early life ==
John Jones Pettus was born on October 9, 1813, in Wilson County, Tennessee, to John Pettus, a farmer, and his wife Alice Taylor (née Winston) Pettus. He was the brother of Edmund Pettus, and a distant cousin of Jefferson Davis. He was raised in Limestone County, Alabama, after his father moved the family from Tennessee. Only nine when his father died, Pettus helped with chores and was educated at home by his mother. Pettus settled in Mississippi in 1835. After a brief stay in Sumter County, Alabama, where he studied law, he opened a law practice in Scooba, Mississippi. In the 1840s, he married a cousin, Permelia Winston. He became a farmer and by 1850 owned 1,600 acres (647 ha) and enslaved twenty-four people. Permelia died in 1857 and Pettus married Sarah H. Potts, of Tuscaloosa, Alabama in 1861. During the Civil War, Pettus's son John joined one of the Mississippi regiments in Virginia and was killed at the Battle of Ball's Bluff in October, 1861.

== Antebellum political career ==
In 1844, Pettus represented Kemper County in the Mississippi House of Representatives. In 1848, he was elected to the Mississippi Senate. In 1853, while Governor Henry S. Foote was waiting for the January 11 inauguration of John J. McRae, Foote grew bitter and angry, addressing the legislative session by announcing that he had considered resigning in protest once the election results came in. At noon on January 5, 1854, Foote's resignation was received by the state senate.

The Mississippi Constitution of 1832 had abolished the office of lieutenant governor. As President of the Mississippi Senate, Pettus was next in seniority and sworn in at noon on January 7, 1854. He held the governorship until McRae was sworn in on January 10, 1854. His only recorded act during these 120 hours was to order a special session in Noxubee County to fill the office of a deceased state representative, Francis Irby. On January 11, McRae was inaugurated as governor, and Pettus returned as senate president. During the 1850s, he became identified as "the Mississippi Fire-eater," a term referring to Southerners supporting secession. As a state senator, Pettus developed a reputation as a "disunion man of the most unmitigated order", advocating for Mississippi delegates to attend the Nashville Convention and discuss the possibility of secession during the 1850 political crisis.

In 1859, Pettus was elected governor by a 3-1 margin. In his inaugural address, he said that the South's only way to maintain slavery was secession and a Southern Confederacy, and he pledged to defend the "superiority and supremacy of the white race" against "Black Republicans". Following President Abraham Lincoln's election, on November 26, 1860, Pettus called for a special session of the state legislature and advocated for a convention to withdraw Mississippi from the United States. The legislature voted to hold a Secession Convention which convened in Jackson on January 7, 1861. Two days later, the state officially declared its withdrawal from the US. On February 4, 1861, Mississippi along with other slave states formed the Confederate States of America, precipitating the American Civil War.

== Civil War ==
With the outbreak of the Civil War, Pettus was faced with numerous challenges, first and foremost being the military situation. While large numbers of volunteers began organizing themselves into military companies immediately after the 1860 Presidential election, Mississippi lacked the funds and arms to supply them. Mounting frustration developed between the Confederate government and Mississippi regarding manpower, because the state took the position that regiments should only be transferred to Confederate service once fully armed. Although some regiments were outfitted at private expense and mustered into the Confederate Army, the state legislature did not supply sufficient funds to buy weapons and lacked existing arsenals to supply the volunteers. To minimize the number of unequipped troops with nothing to do, Pettus instituted a moratorium on volunteer enlistments in May 1861 until the existing units could be properly armed.

Some of the Mississippi volunteer regiments were sent to Virginia to join the Confederate Army, while others remained in the service of the state and were sent to the Gulf Coast during the Pensacola campaign to besiege Federal forts and resist any attempt at a coastal invasion. Mississippi troops occupied Ship Island to take control of its strategic deep water port, but Union gunboats forced them off the island in September 1861. Ship Island remained under Union control for the rest of the war, serving as a base for the capture of New Orleans and raids on the Mississippi coast.

In response to a call for aid from Confederate forces in Kentucky, on September 28, 1861 Governor Pettus asked for 10,000 volunteers to enlist in state's armed forces. The legislature voted funds to pay for this force, deemed the "Army of 10,000", but only authorized a 60-day term of service and did not provide weapons. Before even half of the quota of 10,000 men could be filled, the troops were sent north with inadequate supplies and training. The volunteers in Kentucky did not see combat, but they were exposed to severe winter weather and outbreaks of disease before returning to Mississippi at the end of January 1862.

Despite some discontent that he had mismanaged the military situation and had been too slow to act at the outbreak of hostilities, Pettus was renominated by his party and re-elected as Governor by an overwhelming margin in October 1861.

Pettus, like many other southern governors, sought to keep a state military force under his personal control for home defense, while faced with a War Department seeking to enlist as many men as possible into the Confederate Army. However, it was clear from the experience of the Army of 10,000 that poorly-armed troops enlisting for very short terms of service were of little military use. On January 29, 1862, the state's armed forces were reorganized as the Mississippi State Troops. Men who were not otherwise serving in the Confederate army or eligible for an exemption were drafted into the State Troops for 6-month terms of service and stationed in military camps throughout the state. While some State Troops units saw combat during the siege of Vicksburg, most were idle in camps for the duration of their service, and there were numerous complaints that the state troops could be put to better use elsewhere, either guarding against a slave revolt in their home communities or working in agriculture to supply the civilian population with food. Rates of desertion, absence without leave, and requests for medical discharge from the State Troops were high and they never served as an effective military force. However, Pettus feared that without a state force at his disposal, Mississippi would be powerless to defend itself from Union forces, writing to Confederate President Jefferson Davis in 1863 that the state troops were "necessary to save north Miss from being over run and desolated while all the Confederate Troops were engaged with superior forces of the enemy”.

Economic circumstances in Mississippi also became severe very quickly. The state faced shortages of staple goods such as salt, which was not produced in Mississippi and was essential for nutrition and food preservation. At the governor's urging in January 1863 the state legislature voted $500,000 to obtain salt, and Pettus dispatched agents to other Southern states to try to acquire it. After the Federal Navy enacted a blockade of the Confederacy, Mississippi's cotton crop could not be exported and exchanged for hard currency and essential goods. Facing shortages and massive inflation, Pettus reluctantly allowed cotton merchants to illegally trade with Union forces, and he struggled to convince farmers to grow food crops that could feed the civilian population rather than cotton that could be sold for US dollars. Pettus's administration banned alcohol manufacturing to conserve grain for food, but this directive was widely ignored.

1862 witnessed battles at Corinth and Iuka in North Mississippi as Union forces sought to capture vital railroad junctions in the state. Aware that the Mississippi River was a strategic objective for the Union, Pettus encouraged the legislature to allow the impressment of slaves to build defensive works at Vicksburg, Jackson, and Port Hudson, Louisiana. This effort was stymied by large plantation owners who often refused to send their slaves to work on military construction projects. The state capital at Jackson was captured by Union troops on May 14, 1863. Pettus fled to Enterprise and re-established the capital there. Union forces left Jackson, focusing their efforts on the fortress-city of Vicksburg, which surrendered on July 4. 29,000 Confederate troops were captured at Vicksburg, and US forces attacked Jackson again, burning much of the town in late July. By the fall of 1863, the coast, north, and west of Mississippi were all occupied by the Union Army, and Pettus was on the run, at one point having to flee into Alabama to avoid Union patrols.

== Later life ==
Ineligible under the Mississippi Constitution to run for a third term, Pettus left office in November 1863 and became a colonel in the State Troops, assigned to recruiting duties at Grenada and Macon. After the Confederate defeat, he took the oath of allegiance to the United States in September 1865, but failed on three separate occasions to receive a presidential pardon. Fearing prosecution as a traitor to the United States, he fled to Pulaski County (present-day Lonoke County, Arkansas) to avoid capture. Pettus died on January 25, 1867, of pneumonia and is buried in the Flat Bayou Cemetery, Jefferson County, Arkansas.

== See also ==
- List of governors of Mississippi
- List of slave owners

Mississippi House of Representatives
Vacant recreated Title last held by William Cole	Member of the Mississippi House of Representatives from Kemper County; 1844–1847; With: Lewis Stovall 1844–1845	Succeeded by Oswell Neely, Lumpkin Garrett
Mississippi State Senate
Preceded by Emanuel Durr	Member of the Mississippi Senate from the Neshoba and Kemper counties 1848–1857	Succeeded by Isaac Enloe
Unknown	President of the Mississippi Senate; 1854–1857	Unknown
Party political offices
Preceded by William McWillie	Democratic nominee for Governor of Mississippi; 1859, 1861	Succeeded by Charles Clark
Political offices
Preceded by Henry S. Foote	Governor of Mississippi; Acting; 1854	Succeeded by John J. McRae
Preceded by William McWillie	Governor of Mississippi; 1859–1863	Succeeded by Charles Clark
