= Hop production in the United States =

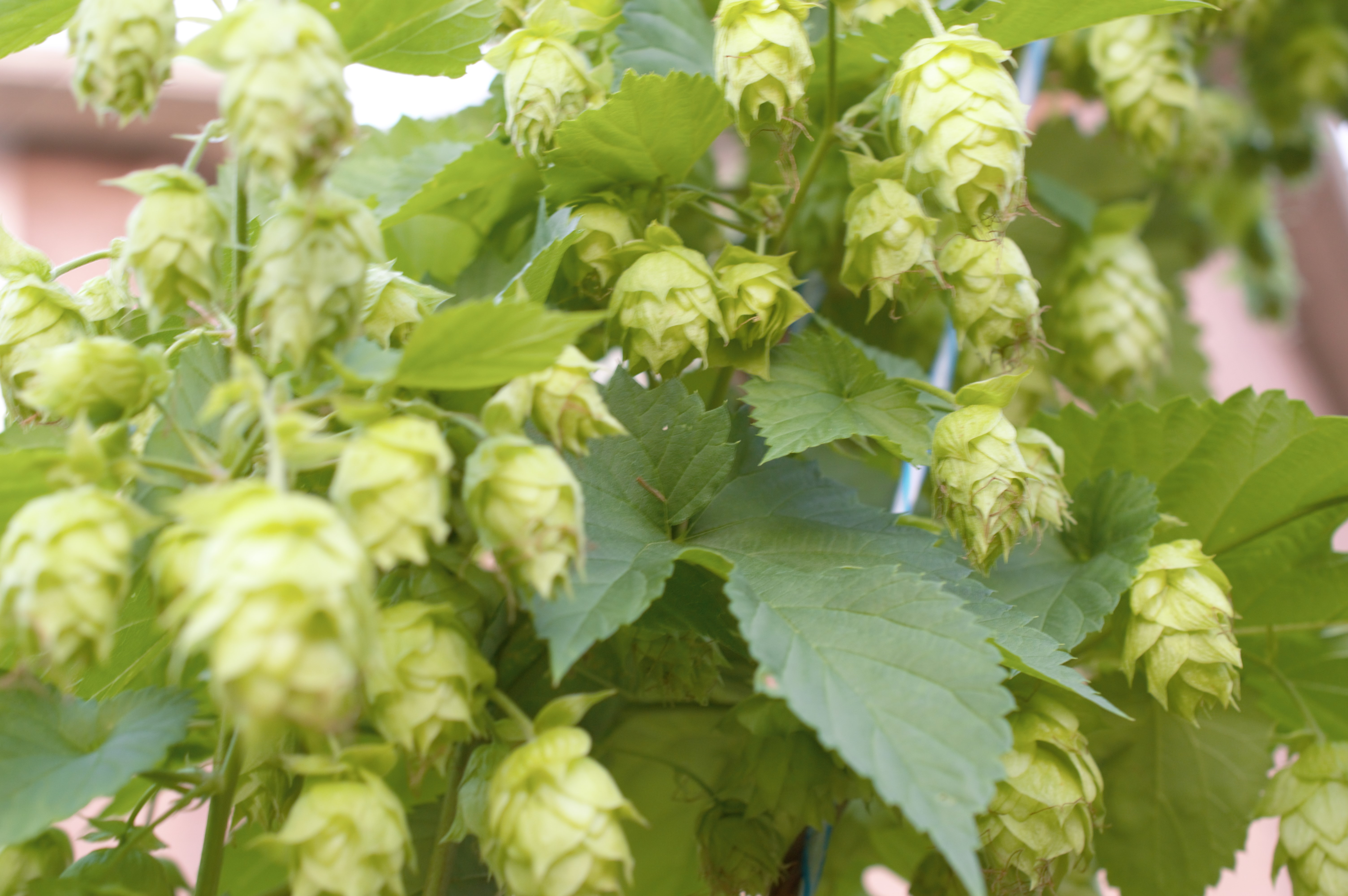
Chinook Hops are one of several varieties of hops cultivated in the Pacific Northwest of the United States.

The United States of America is the world's largest producer of hops, the flowers of female Humulus lupulus plants. The primary use of hops grown in the United States is in brewing. In 2019, the U.S. accounted for 40% of world hop production and 39% of world hop acreage.

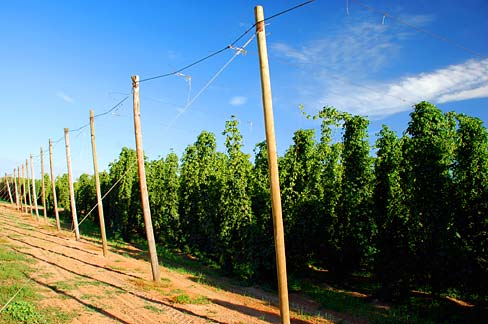
A hops field nearly ready for harvest in Oregon

== History ==
Dutch and English settlers of the New England colonies began importing hops for brewing and medicinal use as early as the 17th century. The Massachusetts Company began commercially growing hops for colonial brewing in 1629. European hop rhizomes were later brought to the west coast by Wilson G. Flint in 1850 during the California Gold Rush period. Commercial hop production in California began in 1854 in order to satisfy a growing demand for beer given the large influx of immigrant miners and farmers that were settling in the state. As the hop industry expanded on the west coast, hop production on the east coast began to centralize in New York during the 1880s. However, it diminished at the hands of several waves of disease and reduced demand for hops as a result of prohibition. Furthermore, hop growth nationwide faced a steep decline with Prohibition, shrinking large growing regions into small pockets along the west coast, primarily in the Pacific Northwest. Following the devastating effects of two world wars in Europe, American hop growers of the Pacific Northwest would reemerge as a main competitor in the world hop market.

== Production ==
United States hop production grew 5% from 2018 to 2019 reaching a record number of over 112 million pounds. Production value was estimated to be worth more than 636 million dollars in 2019.

Hop production in the United States (lbs)
State	2017	2018	2019
Washington	79,083,800	77,727,700	82,014,900
Idaho	14,067,300	16,242,800	17,003,100
Oregon	12,470,400	12,936,200	13,023,200
Other non PNW	1,875,000	1,500,000	1,000,000
Total	107,496,500	108,406,700	113,041,200

Following rapid expansion during the late 2010s, global hop acreage began to decline in the early 2020s. Industry reports indicate that hop acreage decreased beginning in 2023 amid oversupply, brewery closures, and shifting consumer preferences, particularly within the craft beer sector. Similar supply adjustments have been reported in European hop-growing regions as producers seek to rebalance output with global demand. In 2024, Germany surpassed the United States in total hop acreage for the first time since 2015.

=== Production methods ===
Hops grow on bines that may reach up to 25 feet in height. Hop bines are trained to wrap around strings or wires strung between trellises. Following the harvest, hops are kilned for drying before being pressed flat and compiled into bales. Hops are sold in whole cone and pelletized form.

== Agriculture ==
United States hop acreage
State	2017	2018	2019
Washington	38,648	39,170	40,880
Idaho	7,125	8,140	8,358
Oregon	8,216	7,725	7,306
Other non PNW	2,503.5	2,433	2,386
Total	56,492.5	57,468	58,930

Hop farms in the Pacific Northwest region comprise approximately 96% of total United States hop acreage. One acre of hops consists of 889 plants, each of which can produce upwards of two pounds of cones. Hop acreage is categorized by alpha, aroma, and dual purpose type and further divided by varietals. Since 2011, aroma varietal acreage has increased at a rapid rate, likely due to the popularization of American IPA beer styles and an increased demand for new aroma profiles in beer.

Optimal climate, availability of water, and proper soil type combine to make the Yakima Valley and other Northwestern regions ideal locations for growing hop bines. Hops require large amounts of sunlight in order to grow effectively and thus grow best within the 30th and 50th parallels. Many hop farms have been family owned and operated for several generations.

== Exportation ==
The United States exports hops worldwide. The largest importers of U.S. hops include Belgium, Canada, the United Kingdom, Germany, and Brazil.

== Supply ==
=== Shortages ===
Hop supply is highly susceptible to water shortages and dramatic weather effects that may increase with climate change. As the demand for hops in craft beer has continued to rise, shortages and price fluctuations have occurred.

Low crop yield in the 2006 harvest followed by the October 2 S.S. Steiner warehouse fire, which destroyed 4% of the United States' hop yield, led to a nationwide hop shortage that would have visible effects on hop supply for the following two years. With the addition of another poor yield in 2007, brewers were forced to adapt their brewing recipes in order to accommodate less hop availability or pay greater prices in order to acquire hops.

=== Hop contracts ===
Hop farms and breweries commonly negotiate contracts in order to guarantee farms are funded and brewers are supplied with a steady stream of hops for future years.

== Public breeding program ==
After a failed first attempt in 1908, the United States Department of Agriculture's Agricultural Research Service began successfully developing hop cultivars at Oregon State University in 1931. Researchers found American Cluster cultivars to lack hardiness and sought to breed a strain that could resist downy mildew. From the parentage of British fuggle and Russian Serebrianka hops, the program developed Cascade (1972), Willamette (1976), and multiple other successful hop varietals that would be utilized in the future craft brewing movement. While "C-hop varietals" (Cascade, Chinook, Centennial, Columbus) that came from the breeding program were better suited to the growing conditions of the Pacific Northwest, their distinct citrus aroma was too fragrant to be used by dominant macro-lager breweries of the time. Anchor Brewing Company and Sierra Nevada Brewing Company would both feature the publicly bred Cascade hops in their beers during the late 1970s and early 80's. These new styles of American ales, defined by their unique hop aromas, would spark a craft beer movement fueled by the showcasing of newly developed public hop cultivars.

In 2017 the Brewers Association announced a joint research initiative with the USDA to fund the creation of new, public hop varietals with the goal of developing disease resistant and aromatic cultivars for the public domain. Many popular aroma hop varietals, such as Mosaic®, Simcoe®, and Citra®, are privately owned. The Hops Breeding Program at Oregon State University currently conducts research on hop varietals in collaboration with the USDA hops breeding program and the Brewers Association. The program released Triumph, a new public hop varietal, in 2018.

== Sustainability ==
=== Water usage ===
It is estimated that 50 pints of water are needed to produce one pint of a hoppy beer style. During peak growing period, hop bines can use more than three gallons of water per day, relying on effective irrigation methods in order to produce greater yields. The majority of water use by hops occurs in late July to August, when the bines focus their energy on cone production. Water sources that are naturally depleted during the summer may be further strained by the large volumes of water hop farmers require. Drip irrigation systems have been employed in some hop yards to increase water efficiency.

=== Pesticides ===
Hop growers in the United States employ the use of a wide variety of pesticides in order to protect their crop from numerous forms of disease and predation. Powdery Mildew, Downy Mildew, Spider mites, and hop aphids are among many pests that negatively impact hop growth and output. Fungicide use is the most common treatment by hop growers, with plants receiving on average 8.3 applications per season. The nonprofit trade group Hop Growers of America is an advocate for Integrated Pest Management practices in hop farming. IPM in hop growing involves using a scientifically informed rotation of pesticides, growing a diverse variety of disease resistant cultivars, and practicing proper planting techniques to ensure minimal environmental and economic impact. Idaho, Oregon, and Washington all have laws preventing importation of hop roots from outside of the Pacific Northwest in order to prevent the spread of disease and pests.

A joint university study between Washington State University and University of California Davis found that while remaining pesticide residues from hop flowers existed in beer, they were well within safe range of the EPA's Accepted Daily Intake level.

=== Other research ===
Researchers at University of California Berkeley are experimenting with genetically modified strains of yeast that are able to synthesize the natural compounds responsible for hop aromas. In a double-blind tasting test, genetically modified yeast beers were perceived as hoppier than traditionally dry-hopped beers. Hop-aroma producing yeast might eliminate the hefty water and energy requirements for growing, drying and transporting aroma hops or mitigate the effects of supply shocks during poor harvest years.

Recent studies have shown hop growers may be able to bypass the winter dormancy period of hops by "tricking" plants with artificial grow lights. Growing hops indoors using hydroponics could allow for greater water efficiency, eliminate the need for pesticides and result in fresh hop availability year round.

== By state ==
=== Idaho ===
Idaho began producing hops in the 1950s. The state of Idaho is home to the 1,700 acre Elk Mountain Farms owned by Anheuser-Busch. Elk-Mountain is one of the largest hop farms in the world.

=== Oregon ===
The state of Oregon is home to the USDA-ARS public breeding program, credited with developing Cascade and other "c-hop" varietals. Oregon hop production primarily occurs in the Willamette Valley region. The city of Portland, Oregon is known for its number of breweries and beer culture. The availability of fresh, local hops is one attribution to the successful Portland beer scene.

=== Washington ===
Washington is the largest hop producing state in the country. Hops were first introduced to the state's Puyallup Valley by Ezra Meeker in 1865 and spread around the Puget Sound region. The first Yakima Valley hops were planted in 1868 by Charles Carpenter, a New York emigrant. The region soon surpassed Western Washington in production due to the high desert climate and volcanic soil, along with abundant water later provided by mass irrigation projects.

=== Other states ===
As craft beer production increases, nontraditional regions are exploring the possibility of hop cultivation. The number of American hop farms outside of the Pacific Northwest doubled from 2007 to 2012.

==== California ====
While California hop production holds historical significance, modern production is minuscule. In 2019, California harvested 130 acres of hops, a small portion of the total U.S. production. The California Cluster Hop was a varietal grown and used commonly in California during the pre-Prohibition era. The varietal is experiencing a revival in part due to the budding craft beer industry.

==== Nevada ====
The University of Nevada Reno has been experimenting with hop production in North and South Nevada since 2011. In 2014, Reno nonprofit UrbanRoots, the government of Nevada, and University of Nevada Reno partnered to begin testing the viability of hop production in Nevada's high deserts.

==== New Mexico ====
Humulus Lupus Neo Mexicanus is a native North American hop varietal that is commonly found in New Mexico. Neo Mexicanus has been propagated and grown in small quantities in several New Mexican farms, and is gaining recognition in the craft beer industry.

==== New York ====
The passing of the 2013 Farm Brewing Law in New York requires that 60% of each brewing ingredient in licensed farm breweries must be grown in New York State. This act has encouraged a resurgence in New York grown hops.
