= 1857 Mississippi gubernatorial election =

- October 5, 1857
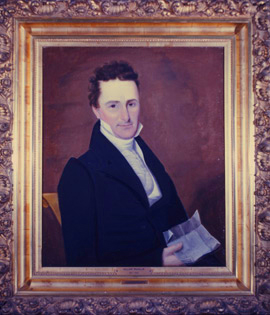

Nominee	William McWillie	Edward M. Yerger
Party	Democratic	American Party
Alliance		Whig
Popular vote	27,377	14,095
Percentage	66.01%	33.99%
County results
McWillie
50–60%
60–70%
70–80%
80–90%
90–100%
Yerger
50–60%
60–70%
Governor before election
John J. McRae
Democratic
Elected Governor
William McWillie
Democratic

The 1857 Mississippi gubernatorial election was held on October 5, 1857, in order to elect the Governor of Mississippi. Former Democratic member of the U.S. House of Representatives from Mississippi's 3rd district William McWillie defeated the American Party nominee Edward M. Yerger.

== General election ==
On election day, October 5, 1857, William McWillie won the election by a margin of 13,282 votes against his opponent Edward M. Yerger. Thus retaining Democratic control of the office, he was sworn in as the 22nd governor of Mississippi on November 16, 1857.

=== Results ===
Mississippi gubernatorial election, 1857
Party	Candidate	Votes	%
Democratic	William McWillie	27,377	66.01
Know Nothing	Edward M. Yerger	14,095	33.99
Total votes		41,472	100.00
Democratic hold			
