= Senator Drane =

Senator Drane may refer to:

- Herbert J. Drane (1863–1947), Florida State Senate
- James Drane (1808–1869), Mississippi State Senate
