= Drane =

Drane is a surname. Notable people with the surname include:

- Augusta Theodosia Drane (1823–1894), English writer and Roman Catholic nun
- Ashley Drane (born 1981), American film and television actress
- Dwight Drane (born 1962), American football player
- Herbert J. Drane (1863–1947), American politician
- James Drane (1808–1869), American politician
- John Drane, theologian
