= 1859 Mississippi gubernatorial election =

- October 3, 1859
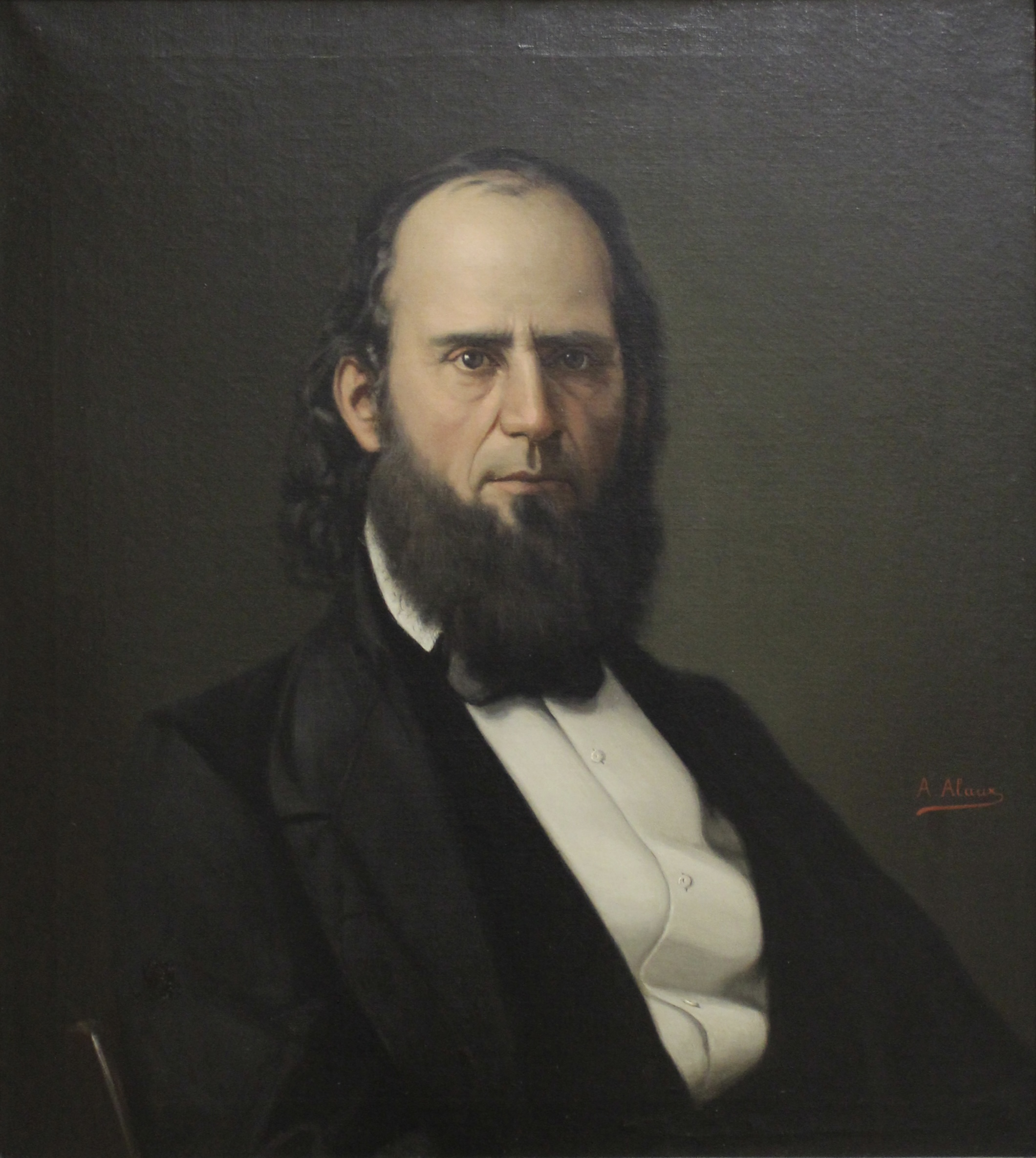

Nominee	John J. Pettus	Harvey W. Walter
Party	Democratic	Independent
Popular vote	34,559	10,308
Percentage	77.03%	22.97%
County results
Pettus
50–60%
60–70%
70–80%
80–90%
90–100%
Walter
50–60%
60–70%
Governor before election
William McWillie
Democratic
Elected Governor
John J. Pettus
Democratic

The 1859 Mississippi gubernatorial election was held on October 3, 1859, to elect the governor of Mississippi. Former Democratic acting governor of Mississippi John J. Pettus defeated the independent candidate Harvey W. Walter.

== General election ==
On election day, October 3, 1859, John J. Pettus won the election by a margin of 24,251 votes against his opponent Harvey W. Walter. Thus retaining Democratic control of the office, he was sworn in as the 23rd governor of Mississippi on November 21, 1859. Pettus' election by such a large margin indicated that secession was becoming increasingly popular among Mississippians, as he had campaigned as a strong supporter of secession of the South from the United States. He would end up fulfilling this as governor in 1861, marking this election as the final one before the outbreak of the American Civil War, which saw Mississippi become part of the Confederate States of America.

=== Results ===
Mississippi gubernatorial election, 1859
Party	Candidate	Votes	%
Democratic	John J. Pettus	34,559	77.03
Independent	Harvey W. Walter	10,308	22.97
Total votes		44,867	100.00
Democratic hold			
