= Walker Brooke =

American politician (1813–1869)

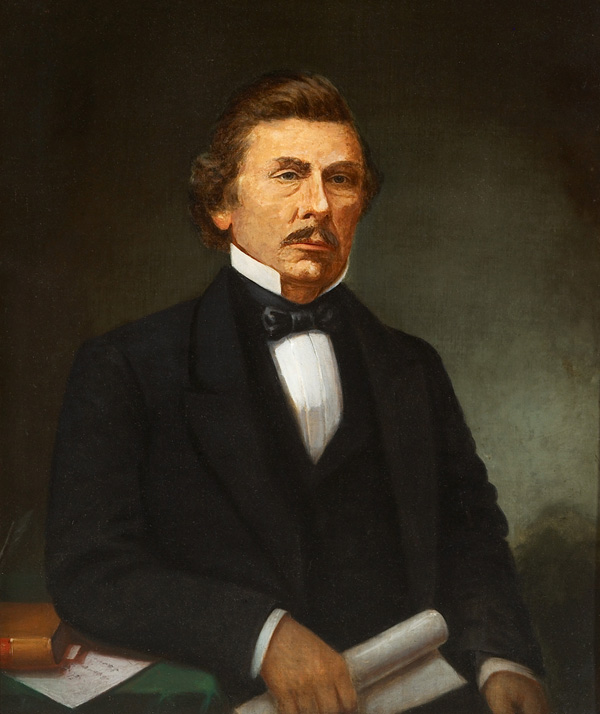

Deputy from Mississippi to the Provisional Congress of the Confederate States
- In office February 4, 1861 – February 17, 1862
- Preceded by: New constituency
- Succeeded by: Constituency abolished

United States Senator from Mississippi
- In office March 11, 1852 – March 4, 1853 Serving with: John McRae 1852; Stephen Adams 1852–1853
- Preceded by: Henry S. Foote
- Succeeded by: Albert G. Brown

Member of the Mississippi Senate
- In office 1850–1852

Member of the Mississippi House of Representatives
- In office 1848

Personal details
- Born: December 25, 1813 Clarke County, Virginia, U.S.
- Died: February 18, 1869 (aged 55) Vicksburg, Fourth Military District, U.S.
- Resting place: Cedar Hill Cemetery, Vicksburg, Mississippi
- Party: Democratic
- Other political affiliations: Whig
- Education: University of Virginia

Walker Brooke (December 25, 1813 – February 18, 1869) was an American politician who served as a Deputy to the Provisional Congress of the Confederate States from 1861 to 1862. He was also a U.S. Senator from 1852 to 1853, representing the state of Mississippi.

== Biography ==
Born on December 25, 1813, in Clarke County, Virginia, Walker Brooke was the son of Humphrey Brooke and Sarah Walker Page. He attended the public schools in Richmond, Virginia and Georgetown, D.C. In his early days he worked as a schoolteacher. He graduated from the University of Virginia at Charlottesville in 1835, studied law, was admitted to the bar in 1838 and commenced practice in Lexington, Mississippi. He was a member of the Mississippi House of Representatives in 1848 and the State Senate in 1850 and 1852, representing Holmes and Sunflower counties.

Brooke was elected as a Whig to the U.S. Senate to fill the vacancy caused by the resignation of Henry S. Foote and served from March 11, 1852, to March 4, 1853; he was not a candidate for reelection and resumed the practice of law.

In 1857 he moved to Vicksburg; he was a delegate to the Mississippi secession convention in 1861. A prominent Unionist voice at the convention despite owning five people as slaves, Brooke eventually voted for secession as a sign of state unity. He was selected by the convention to serve as a Mississippi delegate to the Provisional Congress of the Confederate States. He served in that office until 1862, he then stood for election twice to the Confederate Senate but was defeated both times. Brooke was then appointed a member of the permanent military court of the Confederate States.

He died at Vicksburg in 1869 from choking on a very large oyster in an attempt to win a "friendly wager."

== See also ==
- List of United States senators from Mississippi

U.S. Senate
Preceded by Henry Foote	U.S. senator (Class 2) from Mississippi; February 18, 1852–March 3, 1853; Served alongside: John J. McRae 1852; Stephen Adams 1852–1853	Succeeded by Albert G. Brown
Political offices
New constituency	Deputy from Mississippi to the Provisional Congress of the Confederate States; 1861–1862	Constituency abolished
