= 1861 Mississippi gubernatorial election =

- October 7, 1861
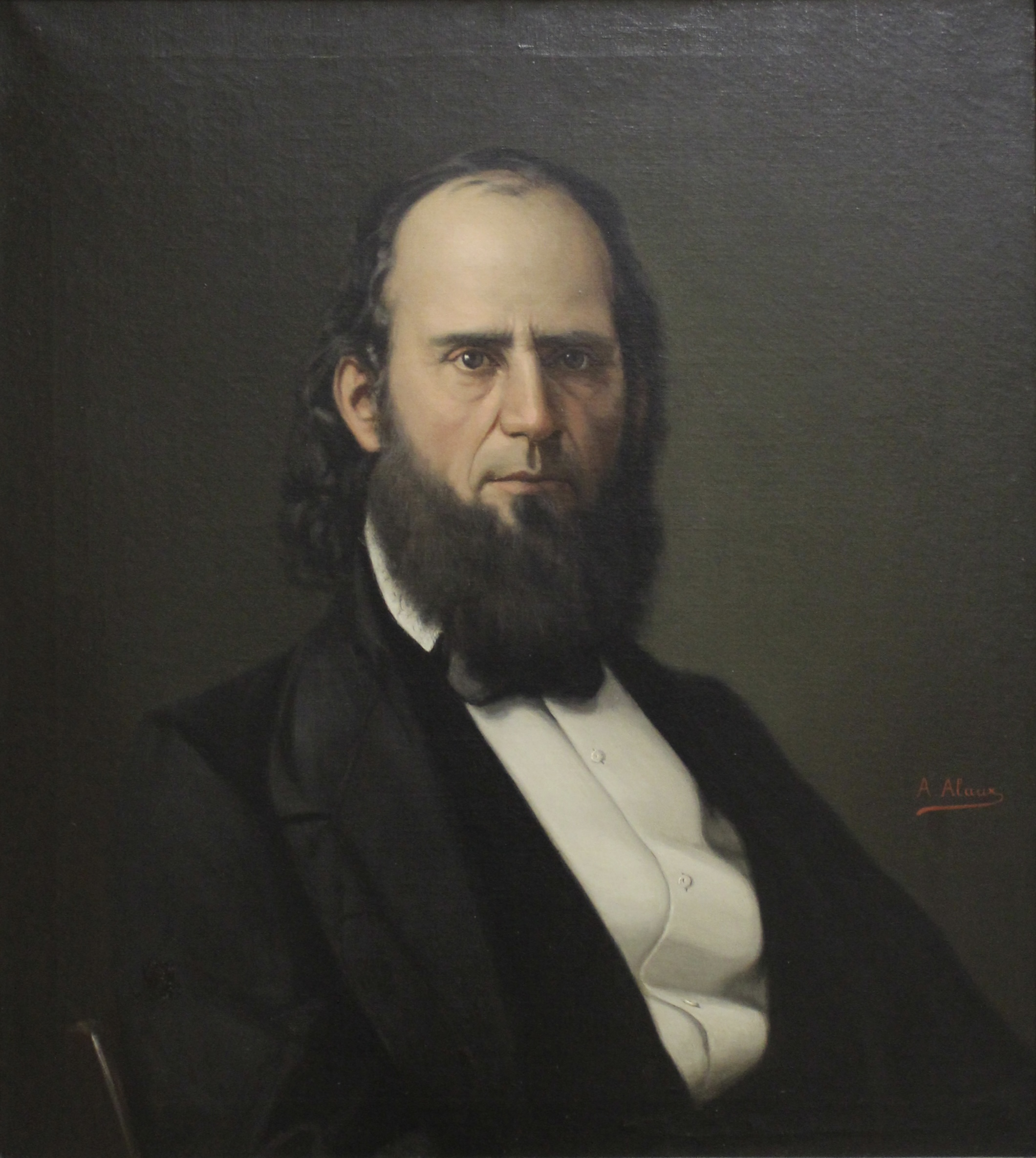

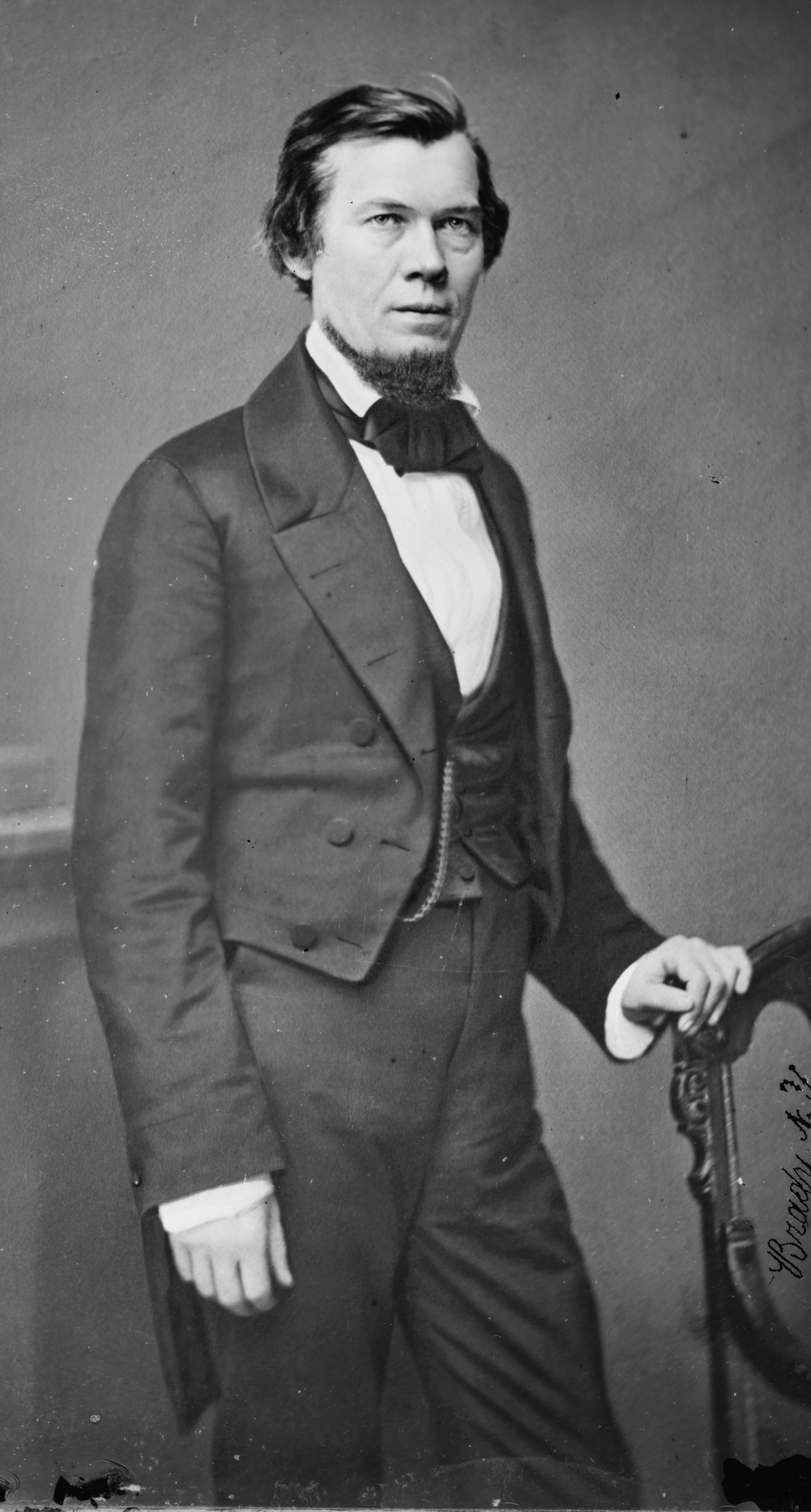
Nominee	John J. Pettus	Jacob Thompson
Party	Democratic	Democratic
Popular vote	30,169	3,556
Percentage	87.14%	10.27%
- County results Pettus: 50–60% 60–70% 70–80% 80–90% >90% Thompson: 50–60% 60–70% 80–90% No vote
Governor before election
John J. Pettus
Democratic
Elected Governor
Charles Clark
Democratic

The 1861 Mississippi gubernatorial election was held on October 7, 1861, to elect the governor of Mississippi. Incumbent Governor John J. Pettus, a Democrat, won against Democrat Jacob Thompson and moderate Democrat Madison McAfee.

Amid the start of the Civil War, Governor John J. Pettus faced internal party challenges and criticisms for military handling. Despite discontent and potential withdrawal, Pettus persisted with the campaign. Mobilization orders in September eased criticisms, leading to Pettus winning re-election in October with overwhelming support, securing victory in almost every county.

== General election ==
By the time of the 1861 contest, Mississippi had officially seceded and was at war with the United States.

Pro-secessionist Governor John J. Pettus received the renomination from the Mississippi Democratic Party, however several newspapers throughout the state endorsed alternative candidates, like Democrat Jacob Thompson, moderate Democrat Madison McAfee, the state quartermaster-general, or Whig Samuel Benton. Pettus was also notified of a long-list of supporters for Madison McAfee campaign. Complaints were levied towards Pettus over mistreatment towards volunteer milita companies and slowness towards mobilizing for the war. Other volunteer units were dissatisfied with the places they were stationed and lack of ability to fight in the war. Nonetheless, the Confederate Army refused to take the surplus volunteers. Pettus in response wrote a public letter, appealing to the voters to investigate the complaints for themselves, though this only angered more Mississippians and generated a rebuke from the Jackson Weekly Mississippian. In August and September, criticisms towards Pettus and his military strategy were at their worst, with volunteer desertions and unfilled equipment requests.

Pettus considered dropping out, however, Reuben Davis advised against doing so and personally stumped for the governor during his campaign as a candidate for the Confederate Congress. Pettus sent McAfee out of state to procure funds from the Confederate government. Noticing the tenuous situation he was in, McAfee withdrew from campaign and defended the governor, blaming himself equally for the military issues. McAfee was rewarded with a position in the executive mansion in 1863. Finally, in September, mobilization orders arrived in Jackson for 10,000 men, with additional mobilization of companies in New Orleans.

With the news of the mobilization orders, criticisms against the governor cleared. Pettus won reelection without significant opposition come October. Pettus won every county but four, beating his nearest opponent on a margin of ten to one.

== Results ==
Mississippi gubernatorial election, 1861
Party	Candidate	Votes	%
Democratic	John J. Pettus (incumbent)	30,169 (Note: 30,169 was reported in the Mississippi election returns, however 30,467 is also reported without explanation. Additionally, based on country returns, the added total is 29,141.)	87.14%
Democratic	Jacob Thompson	3,556	10.27%
Democratic	Madison McAfee	234	0.68%
	Scattering	662	1.91%
Total votes		34,621	100.00
Democratic hold			
