= John J. McRae =

American politician (1815–1868)

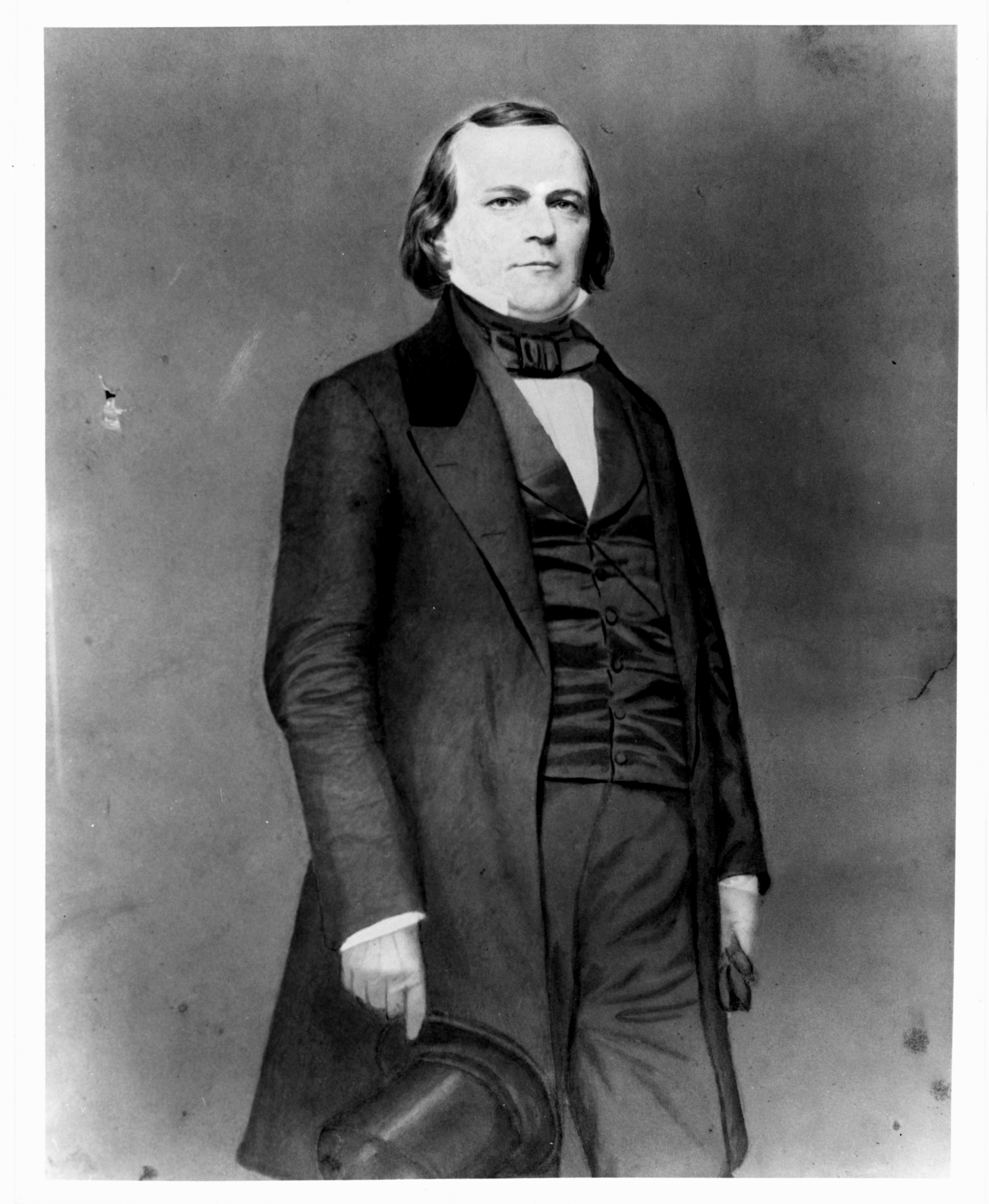

Member of the Confederate House of Representatives for Mississippi
- In office February 18, 1862 – February 17, 1864
- Preceded by: Office established
- Succeeded by: John Tillman Lamkin

Member of the U.S. House of Representatives from Mississippi's 5th district
- In office December 7, 1858 – January 12, 1861
- Preceded by: John A. Quitman
- Succeeded by: Legrand W. Perce

21st Governor of Mississippi
- In office January 10, 1854 – November 16, 1857
- Preceded by: John J. Pettus
- Succeeded by: William McWillie

United States Senator from Mississippi
- In office December 1, 1851 – March 17, 1852
- Appointed by: James Whitfield
- Preceded by: Jefferson Davis
- Succeeded by: Stephen Adams

Member of the Mississippi House of Representatives
- In office 1847–1851

Personal details
- Born: John Jones McRae; January 10, 1815 Sneedsboro, North Carolina, United States
- Died: May 31, 1868 (aged 53) Belize City, British Honduras
- Party: Democratic

John Jones McRae (January 10, 1815 – May 31, 1868) was an American politician from Mississippi. A Democrat, he served in the Mississippi House of Representatives, the US House and Senate, the Confederate Congress, and as governor of Mississippi.

== Biography ==
McRae was born in Sneedsboro, North Carolina. In 1817, he moved with his parents to Winchester, Mississippi. McRae graduated from Miami University of Ohio in 1834, and the same year he founded the town of Enterprise in Clarke County. McRae attempted to find a navigable path from his new town to the sea via the Chickasawhay River, and in 1842 managed to sail a steamboat from Lake Ponchartrain to Enterprise.

He studied law in Pearlington and was admitted to the bar. McRae was elected to the Mississippi House of Representatives, serving from 1847 to 1851. During that time, he helped establish the University of Mississippi.

McRae was selected as a Democratic US Senator from Mississippi in 1851 to fill a vacancy, serving in that office until 1852. He ran for Governor of Mississippi in the November 1853 election, defeating his Whig opponent Francis M. Rogers by a sizeable margin. In the 1855 election he stood again, defeating his Know Nothing opponent by a similar margin to the prior election.

Prevented by term limits from running again for governor, McRae left that office in 1857 and stood for Congress, winning a seat in the US House of Representatives. A staunch advocate of southern secession, McRae withdrew from Congress in January 1861 when Mississippi left the Union. He then won election to the First Confederate Congress in 1861, but was defeated for reelection by John Tillman Lamkin in 1863 due to war-weariness in his home state.

He died on a visit to British Honduras (now Belize), where his brother Colin J. McRae lived in exile.

Party political offices
Vacant Title last held by John A. Quitman	Democratic nominee for Governor of Mississippi; 1853, 1855	Succeeded by William McWillie
U.S. Senate
Preceded by Jefferson Davis	U.S. senator (Class 1) from Mississippi; 1851–1852; Served alongside: Henry S. Foote, Walker Brooke	Succeeded by Stephen Adams
Political offices
Preceded by John J. Pettus	Governor of Mississippi; 1854-1857	Succeeded by William McWillie
U.S. House of Representatives
Preceded by John A. Quitman	Member of the U.S. House of Representatives from Mississippi's 5th congressional district 1858 – 1861	Succeeded by Legrand W. Perce
