= Golden Gate Cemetery (San Francisco) =

American cemetery in San Francisco (1870–1900)

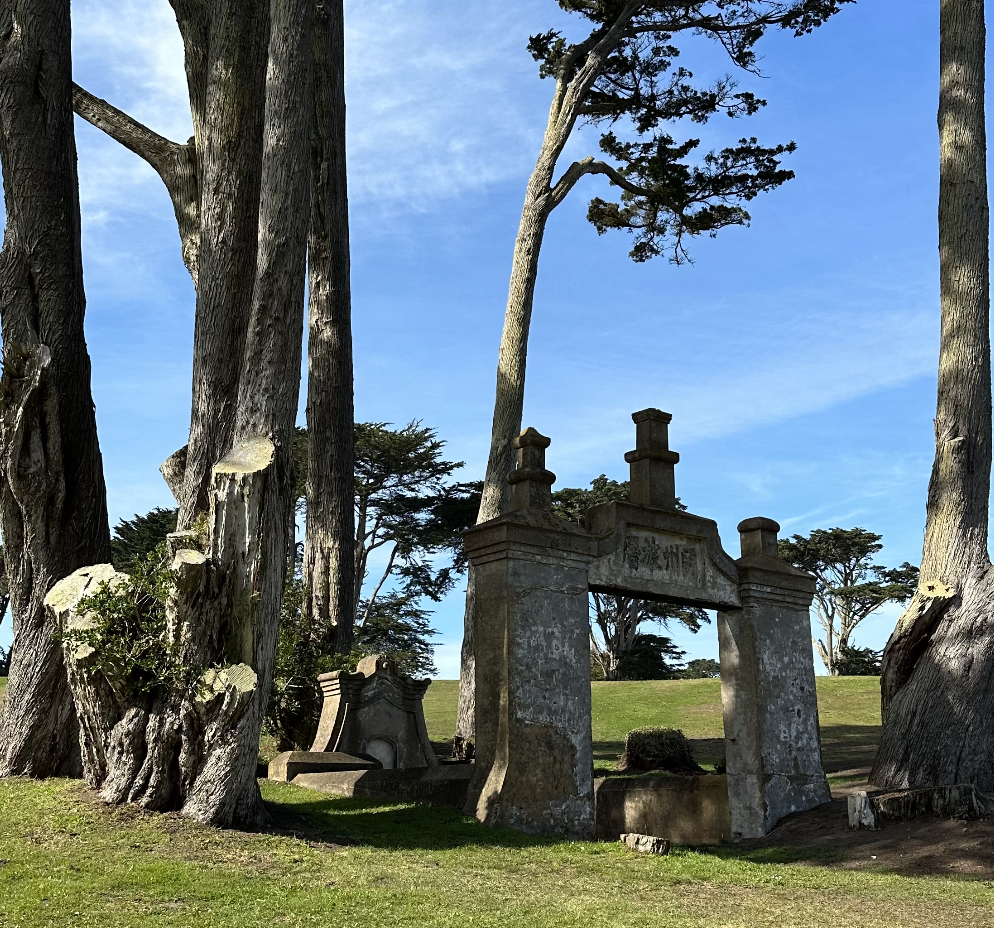
- Kong Chow funerary structure
- Interactive map of Golden Gate Cemetery

Details
- Established: July 3, 1870
- Closed: 1909
- Location: Clement Street, 33rd Avenue, and 48th Avenue in San Francisco, California
- Country: United States
- Coordinates: 37.7852°N 122.50138°W
- Type: City
- Size: 200 acres (81 ha)
- No. of graves: 29,000
- Find a Grave: Golden Gate Cemetery
- The Political Graveyard: Golden Gate Cemetery

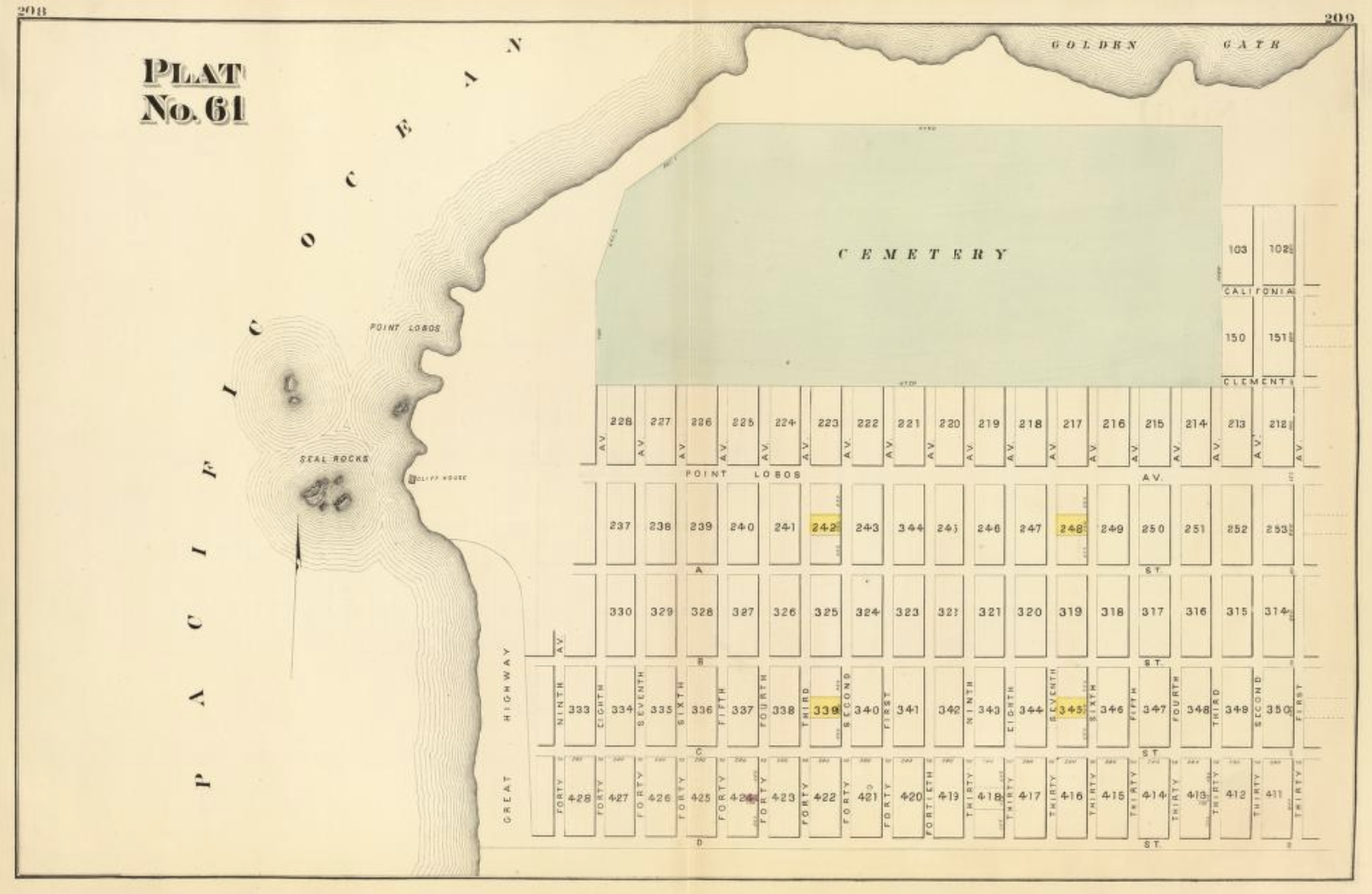
Golden Gate Cemetery in 1876 map of San Francisco

Golden Gate Cemetery, also called the City Cemetery, and Potter's Field, was a burial ground with 29,000 remains, active between 1870 and approximately 1909 and was located in San Francisco, California. The site of this former cemetery is now Lincoln Park and the Legion of Honor museum.

== History ==
The Golden Gate Cemetery was roughly 200 acres in size, bound by Clement Street, 33rd Avenue, and 48th Avenue. A large number of graves had been transferred from the earlier built Yerba Buena Cemetery to Golden Gate Cemetery with the establishment of the cemetery in 1870; some estimates place the quantity at 3000 remains.

Burials in the 19th-century were not always safe, and as urban graveyards such as Golden Gate Cemetery were running out of space so they had stopped using coffins, and bodies were placed directly into the sandy soil. It was not uncommon to hear reports of body parts found near the cemetery or in mausoleums during this era. Chinese mourners would leave food offerings for the dead at the cemetery, which in turn brought "hungry vagrants".

=== Burial population ===
Many of the graves were for city immigrants from Italy, Japan and France; poor and working-class people; and it featured a section as a Chinese burial ground. The burials were done in segregated sections of the graveyard. Diverse benevolent societies, religious groups, and fraternal organizations had been granted the rights to burial here, including the Christian Chinese Society, the Qui Sen Tong Company, Improved Order of Red Men, the Slavonic Mutual Benevolent Society, the Greek Russian Slavonian Benevolent Society, German Benevolent Society, the Scandinavian Society, the French Benevolent Society, the Italian Benevolent Society, Congregation Sherith Israel, Congregation Beth Israel, Congregation Schaari Zedek, the Master Mariner's Benevolent Association, St. Andrews Society and Caledonia Club, the Hop Wo Association, the Ning Yung Association, Chuc Sen Tong Association, Ladies' Seamen's Friend Society, Società Italiana di Mutua Beneficenza, the Grand Army of the Republic, Society of Old Friends, Knights of Pythias, the Golden Gate Lodge, and the Japanese Colony of San Francisco.

Notable burials included politicians Patrick Watson Tompkins and Edward Wilson McGaughey; both of whom were re-interred from Yerba Buena Cemetery.

=== Removal of the graves ===
Starting in 1898, the burials stopped and by 1902, the city had banned any new burials. In 1909, the Board of Supervisors turned the land over to the San Francisco Parks Commission (now known as San Francisco Recreation & Parks Department). Over the next decade some of the graves were relocated to Colma, California. However, not all graves had been properly exhumed, especially from the Chinese portion of the cemetery.

== Present-day ==
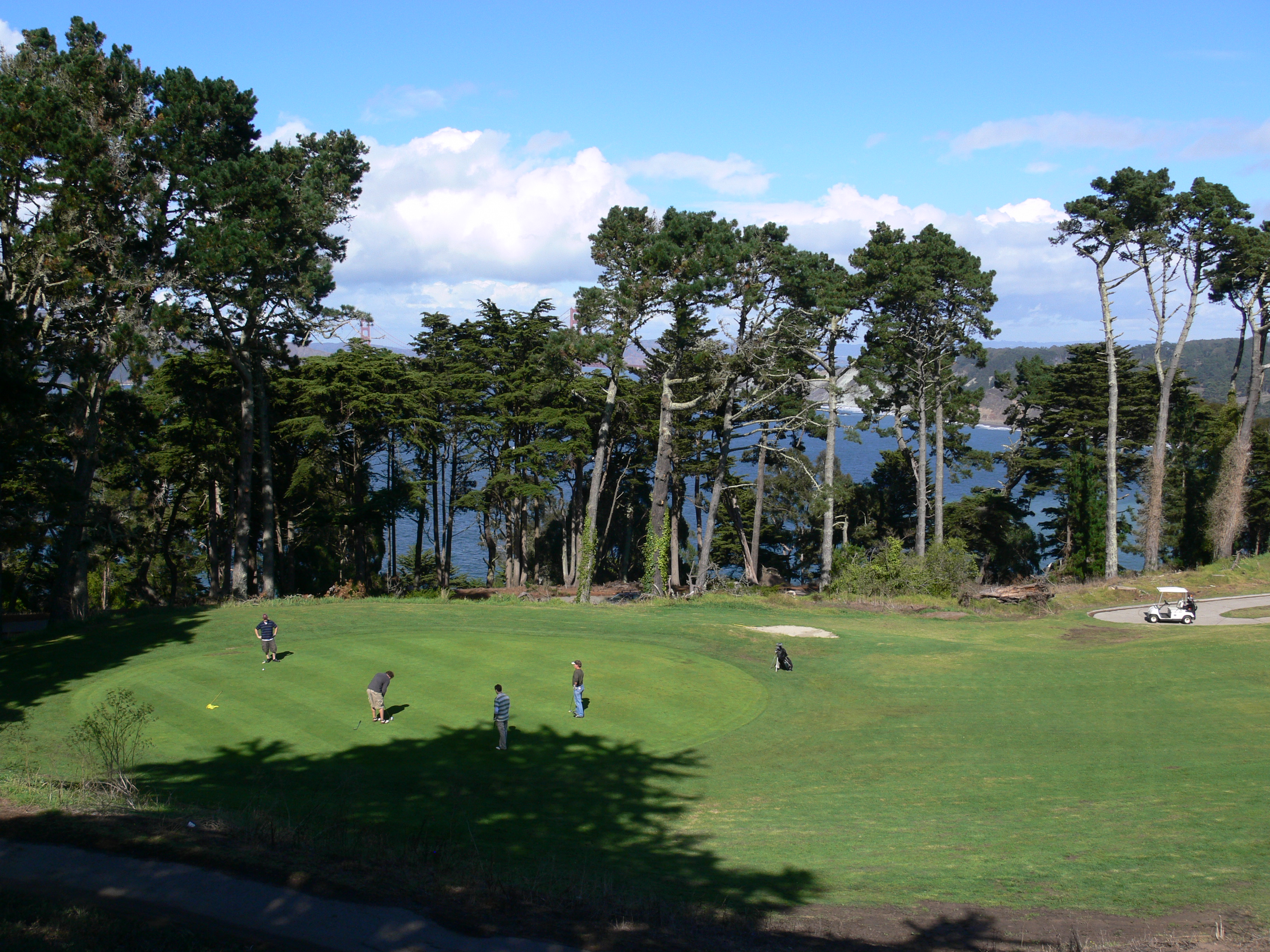
Lincoln Park golf course (2008)

The site was replaced with Lincoln Park golf course, and the Legion of Honor museum (which opened in 1924).

In 1993, the Legion of Honor Museum was renovating and during excavation near Lands End they discovered 700 bodies, and it is believed that there are many more still buried under the Lincoln Park Golf Course. Photographer Richard Barnes was hired by the Legion of Honor museum to document the building's architectural history and changes as they underwent a renovation; he was able to capture a series of images of the juxtaposition of the museum and the skeletons that were underneath, images that were later shown at Carnegie Museum of Art's Heinz Architectural Center in 2001.

Some of the remaining artifact from the time of the graveyard still at Lincoln Park, include the Kong Chow funerary structure and the Ladies’ Seaman's Friend Society bronze obelisk monument. The Chinese inscription translated says, it is a temporary resting place for travelers from Kong Chow (present day Guangzhou) in southern China, which is referring to the Chinese tradition of returning the bones to their homeland.

As of 2021, there was no park or city markers or city memorials referring to the past history of the space as a cemetery, however there has been a community effort to try to add archeological landmark status. In October 2022, the city designated this the first archeological landmark, and added a new sign to memorize the history as a cemetery.

== See also ==
- List of cemeteries in California
- Pioneer cemetery
- Potter's field
- Lincoln Highway, the Western Terminus Marker is on the former land of this cemetery
