= Sneedsboro, North Carolina =

Sneedsboro
- Ghost town
- Location within North Carolina
- Coordinates: 34°49′58″N 79°56′10″W
- Country: United States
- State: North Carolina
- County: Anson
- Elevation: 256 ft (78 m)
- Time zone: UTC-5 (Eastern (EST))
  - Summer (DST): UTC-4 (EDT)
- GNIS feature ID: 1021738

Sneedsboro, also spelled Sneedsborough, is a ghost town in Anson County, North Carolina, United States.

It was the second oldest town in Anson County, and was located about 5 mi (8.0 km) southeast of Morven.

== History ==
The Pee Dee River flows east of Sneedsboro, and when the town was laid out and chartered in 1795 it was promoted as an inland river port. Streets in Sneedsboro were laid out and named, and the town had a post office, school, inn, general store, and both a Methodist and Baptist church.

By 1835 the town was deserted. Poor economic conditions in North Carolina had forced many of Sneedsboro's residents to leave, and an epidemic of typhoid fever had also struck the town.

During the Civil War, a large battalion of Union forces led by William Tecumseh Sherman crossed the Pee Dee River at Sneedsboro. Historian Mary Louise Medley wrote that "though the Pee Dee River was then at flood stage, they took the time to destroy everything of value around the once flourishing town".

The only extant remnants of the town are the crumbling chimney of the Knox Inn, and some tombstones in the Sneedsboro Cemetery, used from 1790 to 1840. Some notable people buried in the cemetery include Charles Harris, a chairman of the faculty of the University of North Carolina at Chapel Hill and its first professor of mathematics, as well as John Hinson, a US Senator.

== Notable person ==
- John J. McRae, 21st Governor of Mississippi.
