= 1855 Mississippi gubernatorial election =

- November 6, 1855
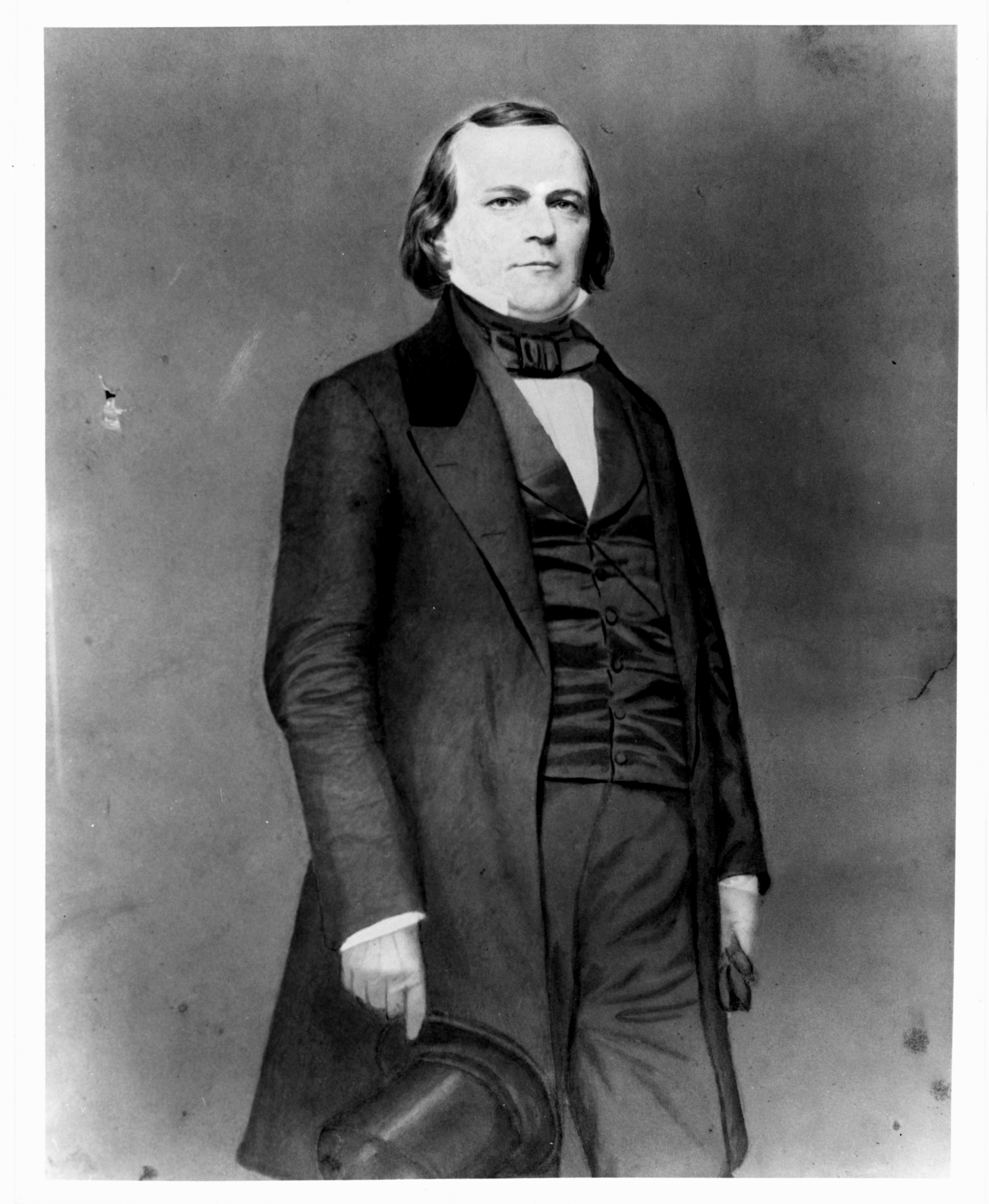

Nominee	John J. McRae	Charles D. Fontaine
Party	Democratic	American Party
Popular vote	32,666	27,579
Percentage	54.22%	45.78%
- County results McRae: 50–60% 60–70% 70–80% 80–90% Fontaine: 50–60% 60–70% 70–80%
Governor before election
John J. McRae
Democratic
Elected Governor
John J. McRae
Democratic

The 1855 Mississippi gubernatorial election was held on November 6, 1855, in order to elect the governor of Mississippi. Incumbent Democratic governor John J. McRae defeated the American Party nominee Charles D. Fontaine and so won re-election to a second term.

== General election ==
On election day, November 6, 1855, John J. McRae won re-election by a margin of 5,087 votes against his opponent Charles D. Fontaine. Retaining democratic control of the office of governor and being sworn in for his second term on January 10, 1856.

=== Results ===
Mississippi gubernatorial election, 1855
Party	Candidate	Votes	%
Democratic	John J. McRae (incumbent)	32,666	54.22
Know Nothing	Charles D. Fontaine	27,579	45.78
Total votes		60,245	100.00
Democratic hold			
