= Patrick W. Tompkins =

American politician

Member of the U.S. House of Representatives from Mississippi's 3rd district
- In office March 4, 1847 – March 3, 1849
- Preceded by: District created
- Succeeded by: William McWillie

Personal details
- Born: Patrick Watson Tompkins; 1804 Kentucky, U.S.
- Died: May 8, 1853 (aged 48–49) San Francisco, California, U.S.
- Resting place: Golden Gate Cemetery, San Francisco, California, U.S.
- Party: Whig
- Profession: Politician, lawyer

Patrick Watson Tompkins (1804 – May 8, 1853) was an American lawyer, jurist and politician who served one term as a U.S. representative from Mississippi from 1847 to 1849.

== Biography ==
Born in Kentucky in 1804, Tompkins received a limited education. He studied law, and was admitted to the bar and commenced practice in Vicksburg, Mississippi.

He served as judge of the circuit court.

=== Congress ===
Tompkins was elected as a Whig to the Thirtieth Congress (March 4, 1847 – March 3, 1849). He served as chairman of the Committee on Expenditures in the Department of the Navy (Thirtieth Congress).

=== Later career and death ===
He moved to California during the gold rush of 1849, and died in San Francisco, California, May 8, 1853. He was interred in Yerba Buena Cemetery, and later moved around 1870 to Golden Gate Cemetery.

U.S. House of Representatives
Preceded by District created	Member of the U.S. House of Representatives from Mississippi's 3rd congressional district 1847–1849	Succeeded by William McWillie
