= William McWillie =

American politician

Governor William McWillie
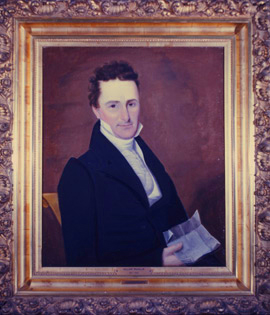
- Portrait of Governor William McWillie

22nd Governor of Mississippi
- In office November 16, 1857 – November 21, 1859
- Preceded by: John J. McRae
- Succeeded by: John J. Pettus

Member of the U.S. House of Representatives from Mississippi's 3rd district
- In office December 3, 1849 – March 3, 1851
- Preceded by: Patrick W. Tompkins
- Succeeded by: John D. Freeman

South Carolina State Senate South Carolina House of Representatives
- In office 1854–1892

Personal details
- Born: November 17, 1795 Camden, South Carolina, United States
- Died: March 3, 1869 (aged 73) Madison County, Mississippi, United States
- Resting place: Kirkwood Cemetery, Camden, Mississippi
- Spouse(s): Nancy Cunningham; Catherine Anderson
- Children: 23
- Education: University of South Carolina

Military service
- Allegiance: United States of America (1812-1815)
- Branch/service: South Carolina Militia
- Battles/wars: War of 1812

William McWillie (November 17, 1795 – March 3, 1869) was the twenty-second governor of Mississippi from 1857 to 1859. He was a Democrat.

== Biography ==
He was born near Liberty Hill, South Carolina, on November 17, 1795. His father Colonel Adam McWillie was a Scottish immigrant who commanded the 2nd Regiment of the South Carolina militia during the War of 1812, and William served as an adjutant in his father's regiment in the war.

McWillie graduated from South Carolina College (now the University of South Carolina) in 1817. He then began the study of law and was admitted to the bar in 1818.

Between 1836 and 1840, he served in both the South Carolina House of Representatives and the South Carolina Senate. In 1845 he moved to Madison County, Mississippi, and was elected to serve his new state as a US Representative in 1849, serving in Congress from December 3, 1849 to March 3, 1851. In the 1857 Mississippi gubernatorial election he ran as the Democratic candidate, winning two-thirds of the popular vote. McWillie served one term as governor, during the 1859 election the Democrats chose to nominate the more extreme "fire-eater" John J. Pettus rather than the moderate McWillie.

Governor McWillie was married twice, first to Nancy Cunningham and then after her death, to Catherine Anderson. One of his sons, Adam, was killed while serving in the Confederate Army. Former Governor McWillie died in Kirkwood, Madison County, Mississippi, on March 3, 1869. He is buried in Kirkwood Cemetery, near Camden, Mississippi, the town he founded and named for his hometown of Camden, South Carolina.

Party political offices
Preceded by John J. McRae	Democratic nominee for Governor of Mississippi; 1857	Succeeded by John J. Pettus
U.S. House of Representatives
Preceded by Patrick W. Tompkins	Member of the U.S. House of Representatives from Mississippi's 4th congressional district 1849–1851	Succeeded by John D. Freeman
Political offices
Preceded by John J. McRae	Governor of Mississippi; 1857-1859	Succeeded by John J. Pettus
