= John Isaac Guion =

American politician (1802–1855)

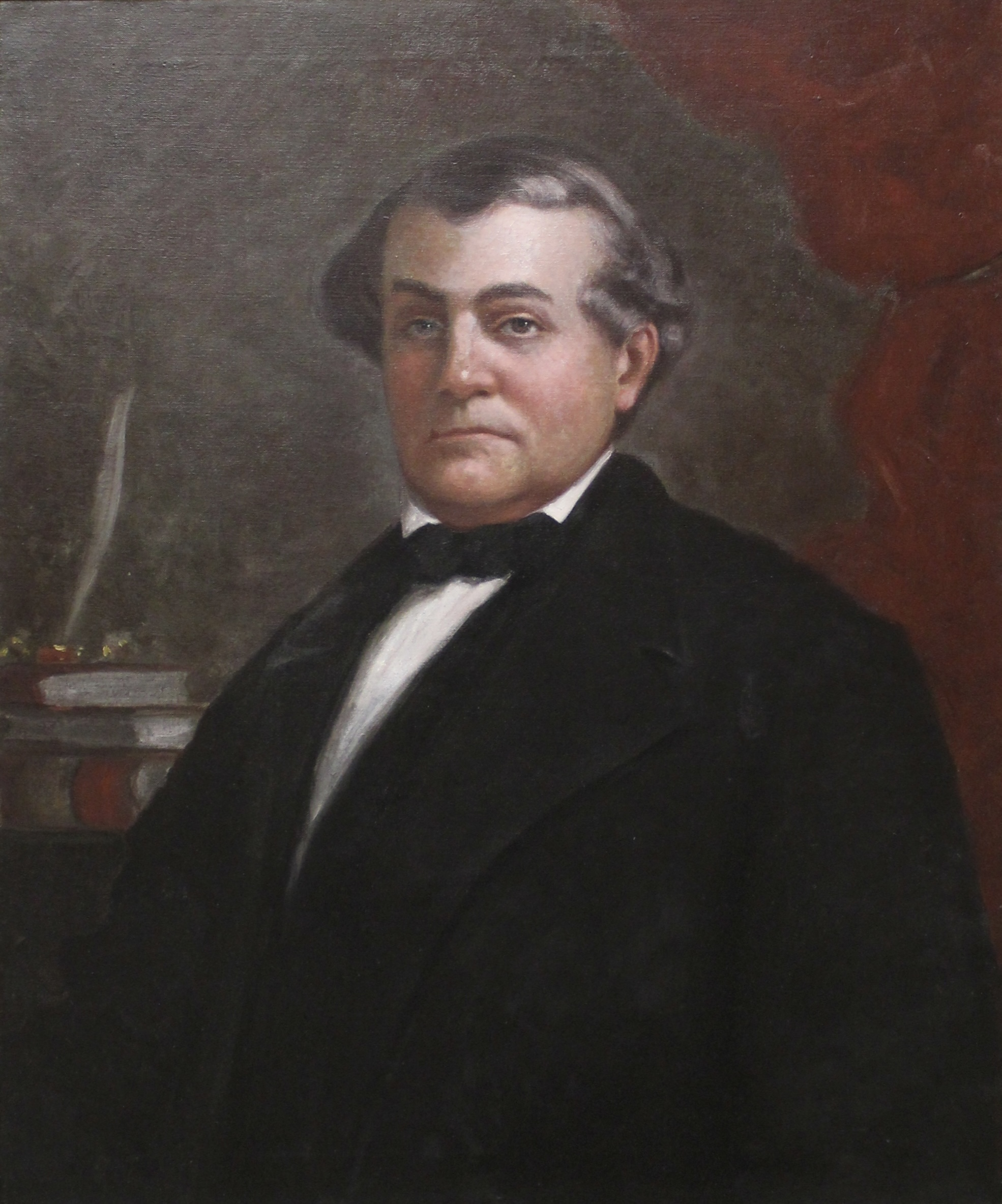
- Portrait of Guion, c. 1851

17th Governor of Mississippi
- In office February 3, 1851 – November 4, 1851
- Preceded by: John A. Quitman
- Succeeded by: James Whitfield

Member of the Mississippi State Senate
- In office 1842–1851

Personal details
- Born: November 18, 1802 Adams County, Mississippi Territory, U.S.
- Died: June 6, 1855 (aged 52) Jackson, Mississippi, U.S.

John Isaac Guion (November 18, 1802 – June 6, 1855) was an American politician from Mississippi who served as acting Governor in 1851 following the resignation of Governor John A. Quitman.

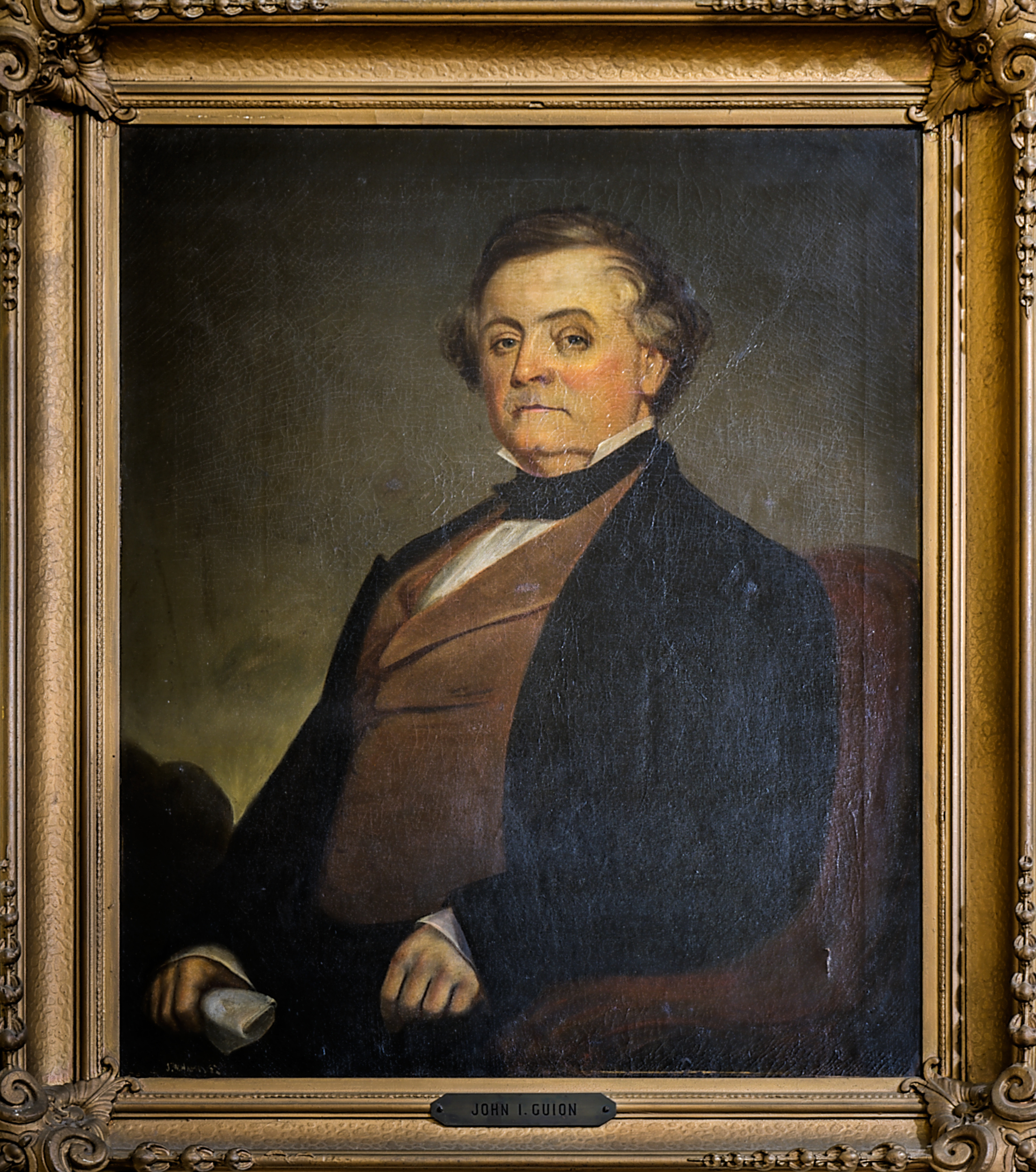
Painting of Guion on display at the Old Warren County Courthouse

== Biography ==
Guion was born in Adams County in Mississippi Territory to Sarah Lewis and U.S. Army officer and planter Isaac Guion. He studied law in Lebanon, Tennessee along with William L. Sharkey, was admitted to the bar, and established a successful practice in Vicksburg, Mississippi. He practiced in partnership with Sharkey and later with Seargent Smith Prentiss. He was elected mayor of Natchez, Mississippi for the 1825–26 term, was appointed circuit court judge in 1836, and was elected as a Democrat to the state senate for Warren County from 1842 to 1846. He later moved to Jackson, and continued to serve in the state senate until 1851.

Guion supported slavery, and played a prominent role in the Jackson convention of 1849, which was called to discuss how the Southern states should respond to the possibility of California being admitted to the Union as a free state.

In 1850 Guion was chosen to serve as the state senate's President pro tempore. In February 1851, Mississippi Governor John A. Quitman resigned to defend himself against charges of aiding in filibustering expeditions against Spanish rule in Cuba. Guion became acting governor and served until November when his Senate term expired. He chose not run for reelection, and the Speaker of the Mississippi House also did not run. Since no one in the line of succession could assume the governorship, the legislature subsequently chose James Whitfield as an interim replacement, and he served until the term of the new governor started in 1852.

Guion left the state legislature following the expriation of his term in 1851 and served as District Circuit Court judge in Jackson. He began his term as scheduled and served until his death. He died on June 6, 1855, and was buried at Greenwood Cemetery in Jackson. He was remembered as handsome, courteous, "an effective jury lawyer, a social favorite...and a true gentleman of much ability."

== See also ==
- Seth Lewis (maternal uncle)

Political offices
Preceded by John A. Quitman	Governor of Mississippi; 1851	Succeeded by James Whitfield
