= Wilson G. Flint =

American politician

Wilson G. Flint (died 1867) was an American politician. He served as a Know Nothing member of the California Senate who represented the city of San Francisco in the 6th Session of the State Senate in 1855.

== Life ==
Wilson was from the state of New Hampshire, but moved to Texas in 1842. It was there that Wilson found a heavy distate for Elite Slaveholders of the state. After Wilson migrated to the state of California, he became active in the Know Nothing Party. He was a part of a large section of Know Nothing's that were elected in 1855, as the party won 56 of 90 Assembly seats that year.

Wilson played an important role for the selection of the U.S. Senator from California. Henry S. Foote was the first choice for Know-Nothings, however he was a notorious slaveholder from Louisiana. Considering this Wilson voted against him, and narrowly defeated his nomination to the Senate.
