= Henry S. Foote =

American politician (1804–1880)

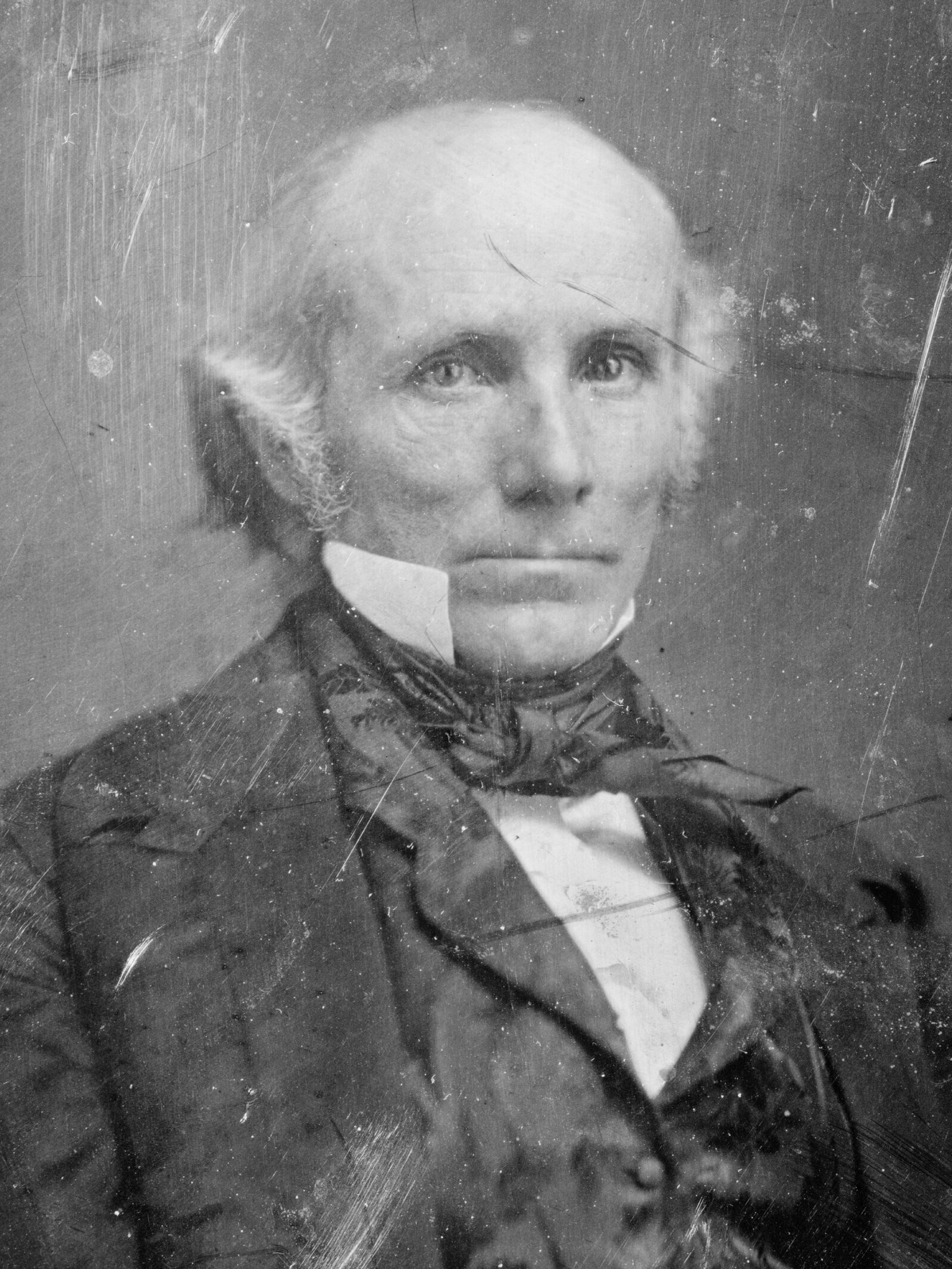
- Portrait by Brady c. 1850s

19th Governor of Mississippi
- In office January 10, 1852 – January 5, 1854
- Preceded by: James Whitfield
- Succeeded by: John J. Pettus

United States Senator from Mississippi
- In office March 4, 1847 – January 8, 1852
- Preceded by: Joseph W. Chalmers
- Succeeded by: Walker Brooke

Member of the C.S. House of Representatives from Tennessee's 5th district
- In office February 18, 1862 – 1865
- Preceded by: Constituency established
- Succeeded by: Constituency abolished

Personal details
- Born: Henry Stuart Foote; February 28, 1804 Fauquier County, Virginia, U.S.
- Died: May 19, 1880 (aged 76) Nashville, Tennessee, U.S.
- Resting place: Mount Olivet Cemetery; Nashville, Tennessee, U.S.
- Party: Democratic (before 1850); Union (1850–54); Know-Nothing (1854–56); Republican (after 1875)
- Spouse(s): Elizabeth Winters; Rachel (Boyd) Smiley
- Children: 6
- Education: Washington College
- Profession: Politician; lawyer

Henry Stuart Foote (February 28, 1804 – May 19, 1880) was a United States Senator from Mississippi and the chairman of the United States Senate Committee on Foreign Relations from 1847 to 1852. He was the Unionist Governor of Mississippi from 1852 to 1854.

Later when he moved west to California, he became an American Party (Know Nothingist) supporter of the smaller minority independent third party) while in California and nation-wide, while he was living there during the late 1850s, the know Nothings were an anti-immigrant, anti-Roman Catholic movement in American political history, which led to several violent riots during elections in northeastern American big cities in the turbulent violent pre-Civil War era. They were especially strong in the border state of Maryland. During its short-lived existence, several of its American Party members / supporters were elected to local, state and national offices, and got their start in political and civic activities.

During the American Civil War (1861–1865), Foote was elected and served in the first and second sessions of the Confederate Congress as the representative of the 5th District.

A practicing attorney, he published two books of memoirs related to the Civil War years, then a book on the history of Texas before its 1845 annexation by the United States, the Texas Revolution of 1836 and brief war afterwards (which led to the Mexican-American War of 1846–1848), and its earlier historical / political period of 16th to 19th centuries in the previous Spanish Empire of the Americas / colonial Viceroyalty of New Spain and in subsequent independent Mexico after 1821. Plus he also authored a post-war book on the legal profession and courts of justice in the Southern United States in the 19th century.

== Early life ==
Henry S. Foote was born on February 28, 1804, in Fauquier County, Virginia. He was the son of Richard Helm Foote and Catherine (Stuart) Foote. He pursued classical studies in 1819 and graduated from Washington College (now Washington and Lee University). He later studied the law and was admitted to the bar in 1822.

== Career ==
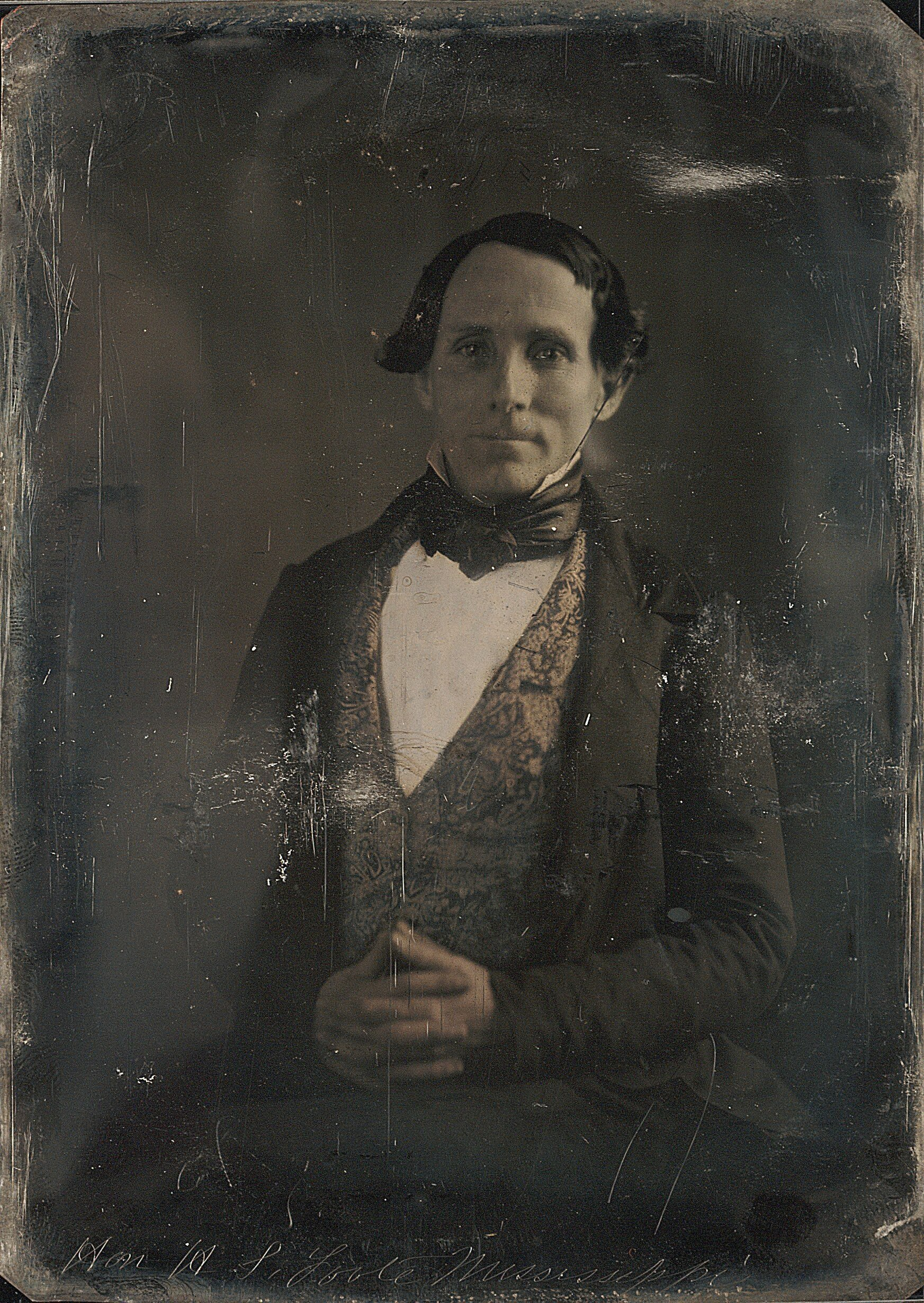
Portrait by Brady, 1849

Foote moved to Alabama in 1824, where he began his law practice in Tuscumbia. He also established a Democratic newspaper. He became a co-founder and trustee of LaGrange College, later known as the University of North Alabama. Shortly after, he moved to Mississippi, where he practiced law in the state capital, Jackson, and in the river towns of Natchez, Vicksburg, as well as Raymond (the other seat of Hinds County besides Jackson), which were centers of business associated with the cotton and slave trades. He also visited the state of Texas and wrote a two-volume book about it, Texas and the Texans (1841)

Foote served as a Democrat Senator from 1847 to 1851. He was the chairman of the United States Senate Committee on Foreign Relations. He played a key role in securing the Compromise of 1850. During Senate debates over the Compromise resolutions, Foote savagely denounced Compromise opponent Thomas Hart Benton. One day, the burly Benton became so enraged by Foote's verbal attacks that he marched across the Senate floor in a threatening manner. As Benton charged him, Foote "advanced backwards" (as he said later) to the Vice President's bench, and drew a pistol. As other Senators tried to intervene, Benton bellowed "Let the assassin shoot!" However, the other Senators wrestled Foote to the floor, took the gun away, and locked it in a drawer. The incident created an uproar that prompted an investigation by a Senate committee.

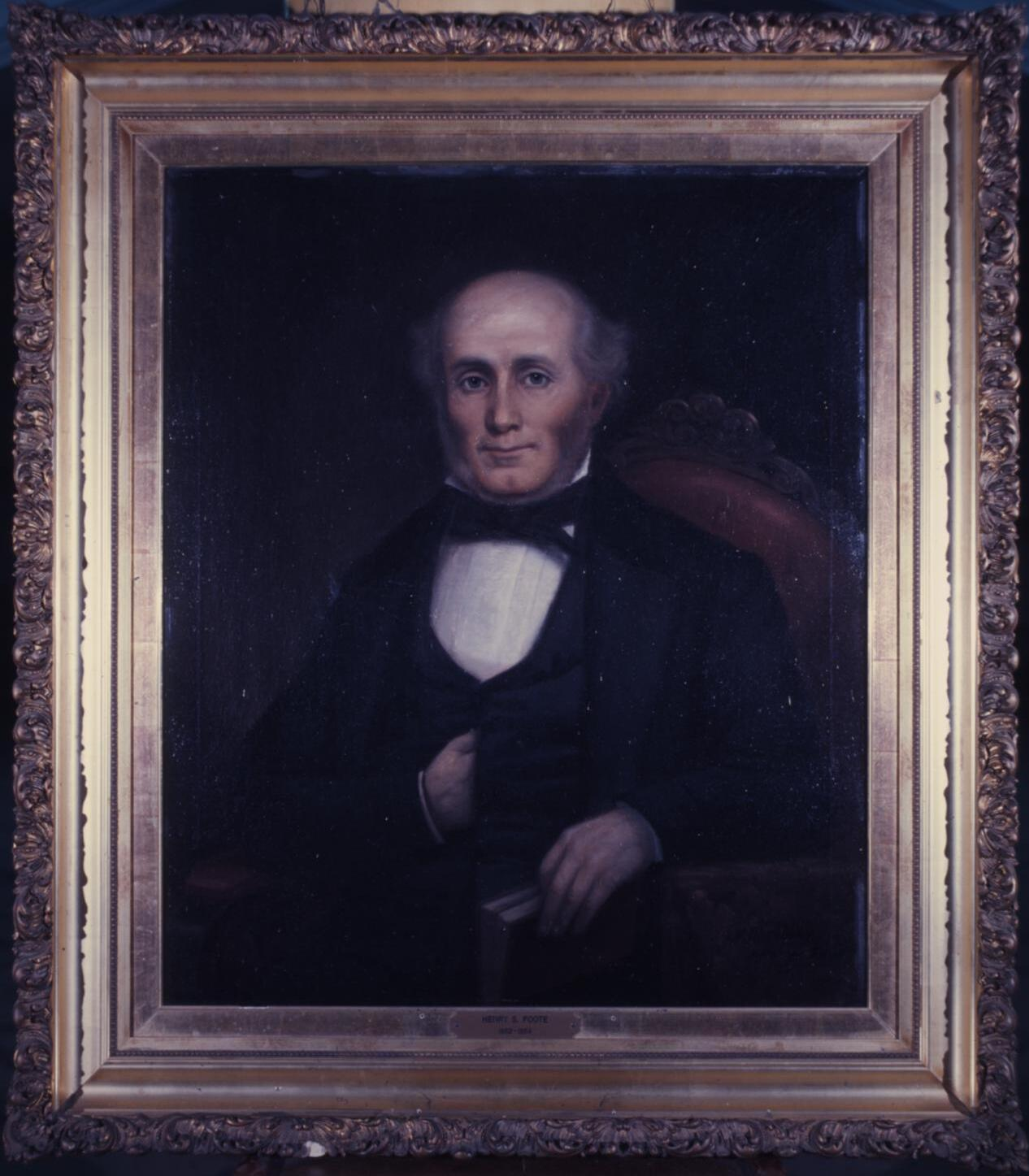
Portrait of Foote as governor

The Compromise was widely criticized in the South by pro-slavery hard-liners such as Jefferson Davis (another Mississippi Democrat). Some of these "Fire-Eaters" even called for secession by the slave states. In 1851, Davis ran for Governor of Mississippi as a "Southern Rights" candidate. Foote was nominated for governor by the Union Party, a coalition of anti-secession Democrats and Whigs. Foote narrowly defeated Davis. He resigned from the Senate to serve as governor from 1852 to 1854.

Foote resigned five days before the end of his term. He then moved to California. He practiced the law in San Francisco, and joined the American Party. Foote was considered a leading candidate for United States Senate from California, but by the votes of every Democratic state senator, alongside abolitionist American Party state senator, Wilson G. Flint, the office went unfilled. He campaigned for the Fillmore–Donelson ticket in the 1856 presidential campaign.

== Civil War ==
On the eve of the Civil War, Foote returned to Vicksburg. In 1859, he was a member of the Southern convention in Knoxville. He moved to Tennessee and settled in Nashville, where he was elected to the First and Second Confederate Congresses, representing the 5th District (Nashville). As a member of the Confederate House of Representatives, he often harshly criticized the war policies of the Confederate President Jefferson Davis. In one debate, he verbally attacked the Confederate States Secretary of State Judah P. Benjamin, and expressed virulent antisemitism.

Early in 1865, Foote attempted to cross Union Army lines and travel to Washington, D.C. but was arrested by Confederates before he could do so. The Confederate House of Representatives voted to expel him on January 24, 1865, but the vote failed to garner the necessary two-thirds majority. Later, he was appointed a Mississippi Commissioner for Confederate POWs held by the U.S. Army (his son among them).

Foote resigned from office in 1865 and moved to Washington, where he sought a meeting with President Lincoln but was refused. Given the choice of leaving the United States or being sent back to the Confederacy, Foote fled to Canada and later to London. There he began writing a memoir of his war years.

== Postbellum career ==
After the war, Foote returned to Nashville, Tennessee, where he practiced law. He was also a frequent visitor to Washington, D.C. He joined the Republican Party in 1875. He attended the 1876 Republican National Convention. He published two memoirs and a history of the law in the region. He was then appointed by President Rutherford B. Hayes to serve as the superintendent of the New Orleans Mint from 1878 to 1880. His final public speech, delivered in 1879, was a civil rights speech, and he advocated for the cause in his memoirs.

== Personal life and death ==
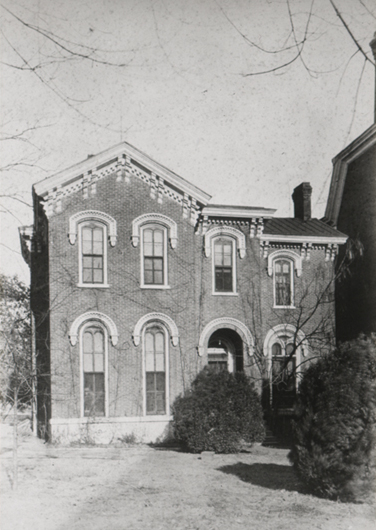
Old Central

Foote was married twice. With his first wife, Elizabeth Winters, he had two sons and three daughters. His son Henry S. Foote Jr. served in the Confederate States Army and later as a superior court judge in California. His other son, W. W. Foote, also served in the CSA and ran for the U.S. Senate as a Democrat from California in 1892. One of his daughters married Nevada Senator William Morris Stewart.

Foote had a third son with his second wife, Rachel Douglas Boyd Smiley. They briefly resided at Old Central in West Nashville, a house built in 1858 on land she had inherited from her grandfather, John Boyd, a congressman for the Republic of Texas. The land and house later became property of Vanderbilt University, where it still stands today. His third son moved to California.

Foote died on May 19, 1880, in Nashville, Tennessee. He was buried in the Smiley family plot at the Mount Olivet Cemetery in Nashville. His second wife Rachel died in 1882.

Party political offices
First	Union nominee for Governor of Mississippi; 1851	Succeeded by None
U.S. Senate
Preceded by Joseph W. Chalmers	U.S. senator (Class 2) from Mississippi; March 4, 1847 – January 8, 1852; Served alongside: Jesse Speight, Jefferson Davis and John J. McRae	Succeeded by Walker Brooke
Political offices
Preceded by James Whitfield	Governor of Mississippi; January 10, 1852 – January 5, 1854	Succeeded by John J. Pettus
Confederate States House of Representatives
Preceded by (none)	Member of the C.S. House of Representatives from Tennessee; February 18, 1862 – January 24, 1865	Succeeded by (none)
