= James Drane =

American politician (1808–1869)

- Born: 1808; Columbia County, Georgia, U.S.
- Died: 1869 (aged 60–61); Choctaw County, Mississippi, U.S.
- Occupation: Politician

James Drane (1808–1869) was an American politician.

== Early life ==
James Drane was born in 1808 in Columbia County, Georgia.

== Career ==
Drane served in the Mississippi House of Representatives from 1836 to 1850. He went on to serve in the Mississippi State Senate from 1850 to 1865, including as its president from 1858 to 1865.

Drane also ran for Governor of Mississippi in 1857 and 1859.

== Death ==
Drane died in 1869.
