= James Whitfield (Mississippi politician) =

American politician (1791–1875)

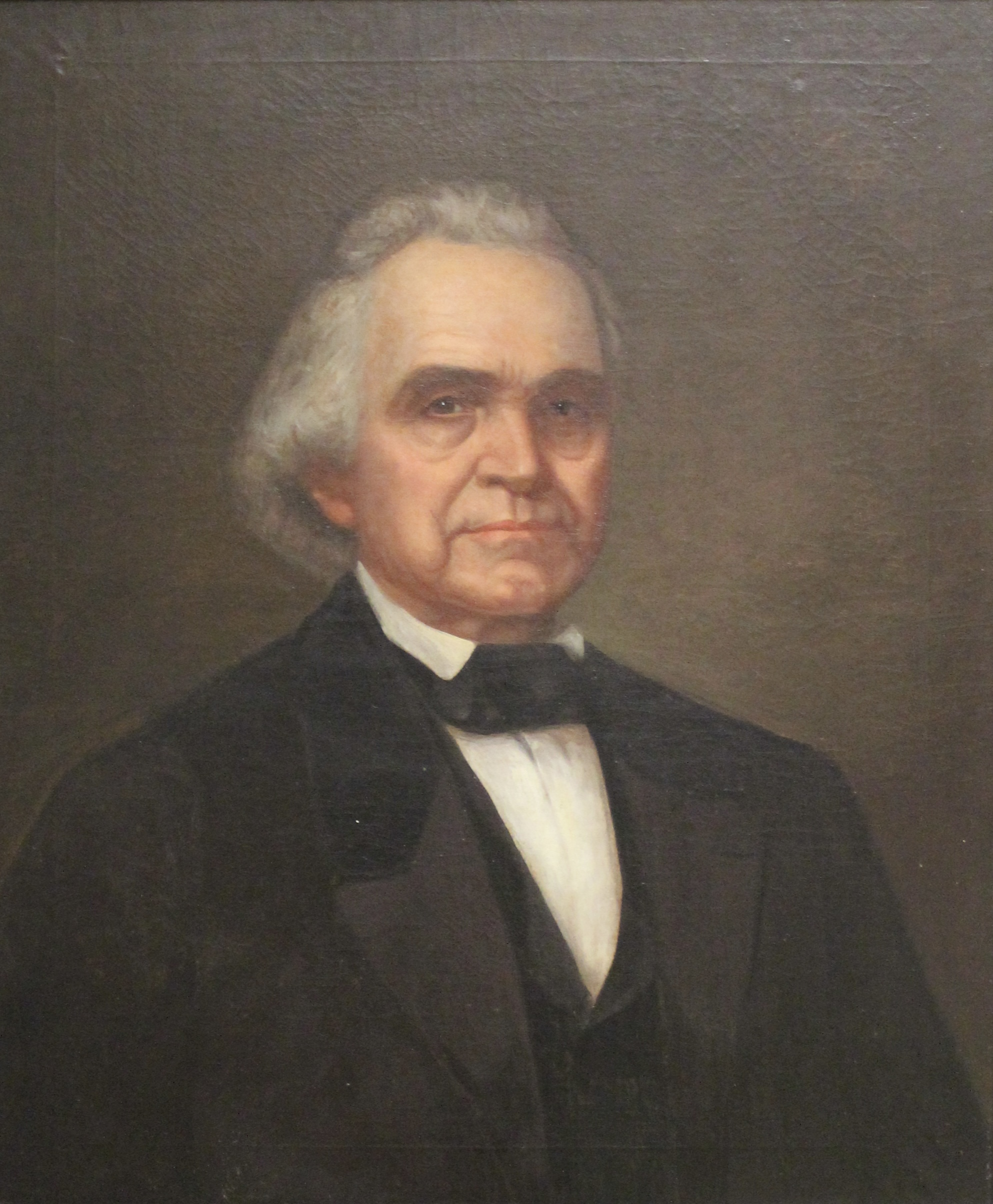

18th Governor of Mississippi
- In office November 24, 1851 – January 10, 1852
- Preceded by: John I. Guion
- Succeeded by: Henry S. Foote

Member of the Mississippi House of Representatives

Member of the Mississippi Senate

Personal details
- Born: December 15, 1791 Elbert County, Georgia, U.S.
- Died: June 25, 1875 (aged 83) Columbus, Mississippi, U.S.
- Party: Democratic
- Spouse: Louisa Dyer

James Whitfield (December 15, 1791 – June 25, 1875) was an American politician. He served as the Governor of Mississippi from November 24, 1851, to January 10, 1852. He also served in both houses of the Mississippi Legislature.

== Background ==
Whitfield was born in 1791 in Elbert County, Georgia and later moved to Columbus, Mississippi. He served in the Mississippi legislature as a Democrat representing Lowndes County, and was elected to the state senate in 1851.

In February 1851, Mississippi Governor John A. Quitman resigned to defend himself against charges of aiding in filibustering expeditions against Spanish rule in Cuba. John Isaac Guion, President pro tempore of the state senate became acting governor and served until November when his Senate term expired. Guion chose not run for reelection, and the state senate called a special session to select a replacement. Whitfield was chosen by a majority of only one vote and served the remainder of Quitman's term, from November 24, 1851 to January 10, 1852.

After leaving office, Whitfield served again as a state representative from Lowndes County in 1858, and was president of the Columbus Banking and Insurance Company until 1870. He donated 185 acres (0.75 km^{2}) of land in the northern part of the state to facilitate the creation of what is simultaneously the state's largest psychiatric facility and hospital, now known as Mississippi State Hospital. His Columbus, Mississippi plantation was sold in 1852 to Thomas Carleton Billups and is known today as The Billups Whitfield Place.

In the same year, he built a house in Columbus known as Snowdoun, featured annually on a local tour of homes. It was here that Jefferson Davis stayed while campaigning across the state for the U.S. Senate. He gave a speech from the balcony of this house. The home was later visited by author Julian Street as he traveled across the Southern U.S. compiling notes for his book American Adventures in 1915.

== Sources ==
- McLemore, Richard Aubrey. A History of Mississippi, Vol. I. 1973: University of Mississippi Press. p. 307.
- Mississippi Official and Statistical Register. 1912. p. 64.
- Rowland, Dunbar. Mississippi Comprising Sketches in Cyclopedic Form I. p. 960.

Political offices
Preceded by John I. Guion	Governor of Mississippi; 1851–1852	Succeeded by Henry S. Foote
