= Blanche Ames =

Blanche Ames may refer to:

- Blanche Ames Ames (1878–1969), American artist, activist and inventor
- Blanche Butler Ames (1847–1939), First Lady of Mississippi
