= Butler Ames =

American politician (1871–1954)

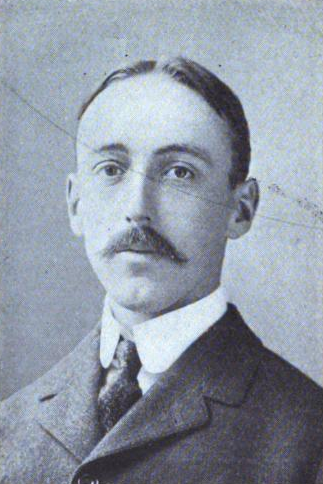
- Butler Ames circa 1908

Member of the U.S. House of Representatives from Massachusetts's 5th district
- In office March 4, 1903 – March 3, 1913
- Preceded by: William Shadrach Knox
- Succeeded by: John Jacob Rogers

Member of the Massachusetts House of Representatives from the 27th Middlesex district
- In office January 5, 1898 – January 1, 1901 Serving with Frank H. Farmer (1898–99); John T. Sparks (1899–1901)
- Preceded by: Charles E. Hosmer; Edward A. Stevens
- Succeeded by: Chester W. Clark; William H. Downs

Personal details
- Born: August 22, 1871 Lowell, Massachusetts, U.S.
- Died: November 6, 1954 (aged 83) Tewksbury, Massachusetts, U.S.
- Resting place: Hildreth Family Cemetery; Lowell, Massachusetts
- Party: Republican
- Education: Phillips Exeter Academy; United States Military Academy; Massachusetts Institute of Technology
- Occupation: mechanical and electrical engineer

Military service
- Allegiance: United States
- Branch/service: United States Army
- Years of service: 1894, 1898–1899
- Rank: Lieutenant Colonel
- Battles/wars: Spanish–American War

Butler Ames (August 22, 1871 – November 6, 1954) was an American politician, engineer, soldier and businessman. He was the son of Adelbert Ames and grandson of Benjamin Franklin Butler, both decorated generals in the Union Army during the American Civil War.

== Biography ==
Born in Lowell, Massachusetts, Ames attended the public schools and Phillips Exeter Academy, in Exeter, New Hampshire, and graduated from the United States Military Academy at West Point in 1894. He resigned from the United States Army after appointment as second lieutenant to the Eleventh Regiment, United States Infantry; took a postgraduate course at Massachusetts Institute of Technology, was a member of Theta Xi fraternity, and graduated in 1896 as a mechanical and electrical engineer.

Ames engaged in manufacturing; served as a member of the common council of Lowell in 1896; like his father, he re-joined the Army during the Spanish–American War and was commissioned lieutenant and adjutant of the Sixth Regiment, Massachusetts Volunteer Infantry; appointed acting engineer officer of the Second Army Corps under General Graham, in addition to his duties as adjutant. He was promoted to lieutenant colonel in August 1898; served as civil administrator of the Arecibo district of Puerto Rico until November 1898.

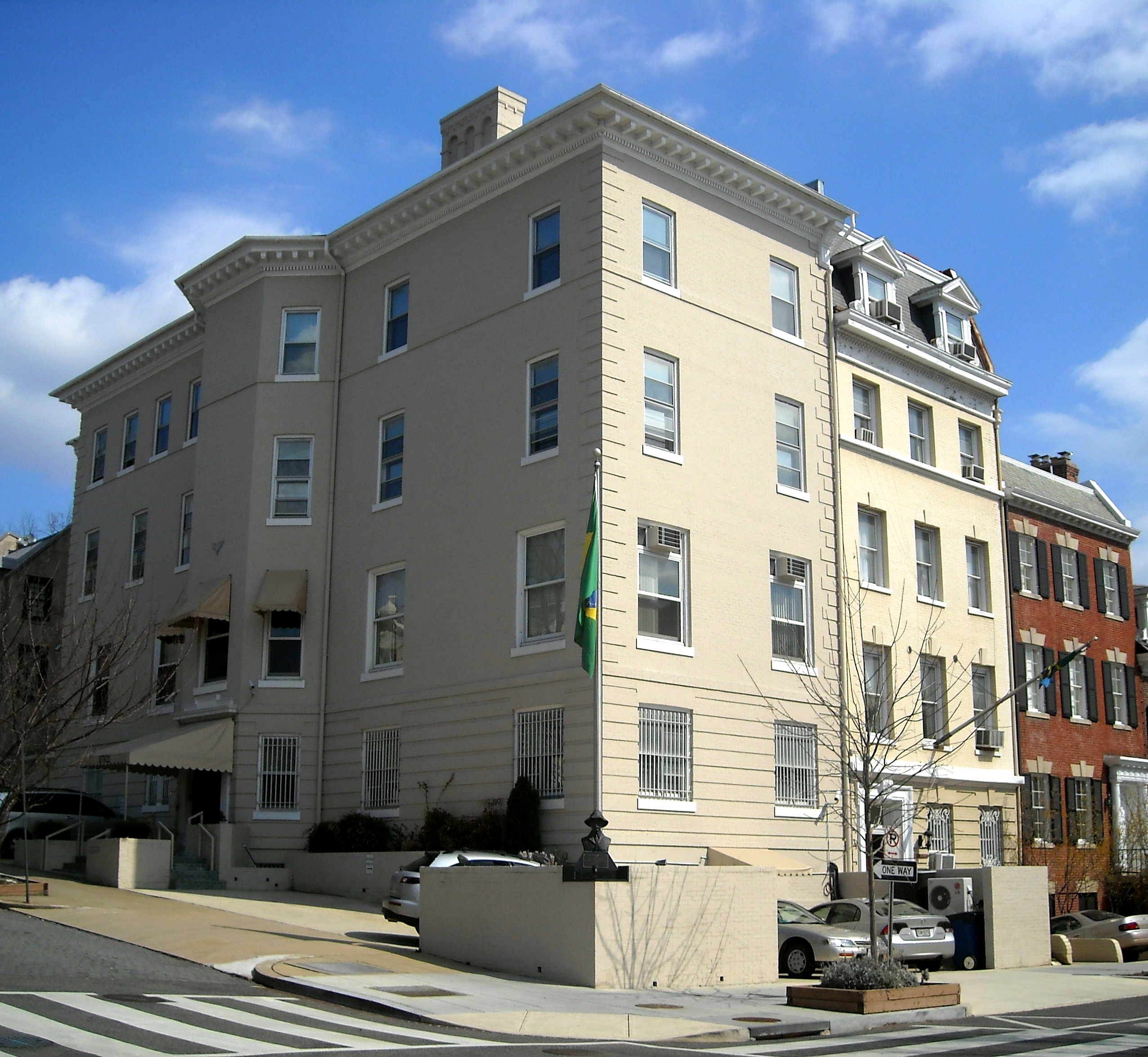
Ames' former residence in Washington, D.C.

Ames became a member of the Massachusetts House of Representatives 1897–1899; elected as a Republican to the Fifty-eighth and to the four succeeding Congresses (March 4, 1903 – March 3, 1913); was not a candidate for renomination in 1912. In 1903 he was elected a member of the Ancient and Honorable Artillery Company of Massachusetts. In 1904 he was elected as an honorary member of the New Hampshire Society of the Cincinnati.

After serving in Congress, he resumed manufacturing pursuits. He was president of United States Cartridge Company, and treasurer of Heinze Electrical Co. of Lowell; at time of death was treasurer and a director of Wamesit Power Co. of Lowell, Massachusetts. He also served as director of the Union Land and Grazing Company in Colorado Springs, Colorado, and vice president and a director of Ames Textile in Lowell, Massachusetts.

Ames was completely taken with Villa del Balbianello when he visited Europe for the first time in 1911, and he determined to purchase the Villa. Ames almost lost the Villa to Prince Eithel-Friedrich, the Kaiser's youngest son, in 1914. The Villa did not sell to Eithel-Friedrich due to an Italian law stating that as the Villa was one of the art monuments of Italy, they had the right to be the preferred purchaser at that price. Ames won his battle in 1919, beautifully restoring the villa. On a dictaphone tape he tells the story (also a short autobiography). The tape was transcribed, and his greater family published it in book form: "Butler Ames and the Villa Balbianello, Lake Como, Italy, An American Oral History." Essays and introductions by Evelyn Ames, Pauline Ames Plimpton, Ezio Antonini, Sarah and George Plimpton plus period photographs and the illustrated Guest Book 1920 to 1970 was added. The book was edited by Oakes Plimpton and printed by Hobblebush Press, 2009, available through Amazon Books or Oakes Plimpton, 67 Coolidge Road, Arlington, MA 02476.

In 1927, Ames spearheaded the construction of Lowell Airport. The airport opened on June 21, 1928.

Ames died in Tewksbury, Massachusetts, in 1954, at the age of 83. He is buried, along with his father, grandfather and extended family, in the Hildreth family cemetery, behind the main cemetery on Hildreth Street in Lowell.

His heirs sold Villa del Balbianello in 1974 to Guido Monzino.

U.S. House of Representatives
Preceded by William S. Knox	Member of the U.S. House of Representatives from Massachusetts's 5th congressional district March 4, 1903 – March 3, 1913	Succeeded by John Jacob Rogers
