= Hildreth Cemetery =

Cemetery in Lowell, Massachusetts

Coordinates: 42.661417°N 71.308796°W

Hildreth Cemetery is a small cemetery located on Hildreth Street at Sutherland and By streets in the Centralville neighborhood of Lowell, Massachusetts, United States. The cemetery's history dates back to the mid-18th century, when it was designated as a burial ground by Major Ephraim Hildreth before his death in 1740. Though located within the Lowell city limits, it is actually administered by the nearby town of Dracut because the cemetery was built when Centralville was still a part of Dracut.

In 1913, the City of Lowell attempted to sell the cemetery after the Town of Dracut neglected to pay a tax on a new sidewalk on Hildreth Street; this would have resulted in the forced relocation of many of the remains at the cemetery. After an injunction in Suffolk County court to prevent the sale, the town continues to maintain the cemetery. The nearby private cemetery containing the graves of General Benjamin Butler and his wife, Sarah Hildreth, was not affected.

== Vandalism, October 2009 ==
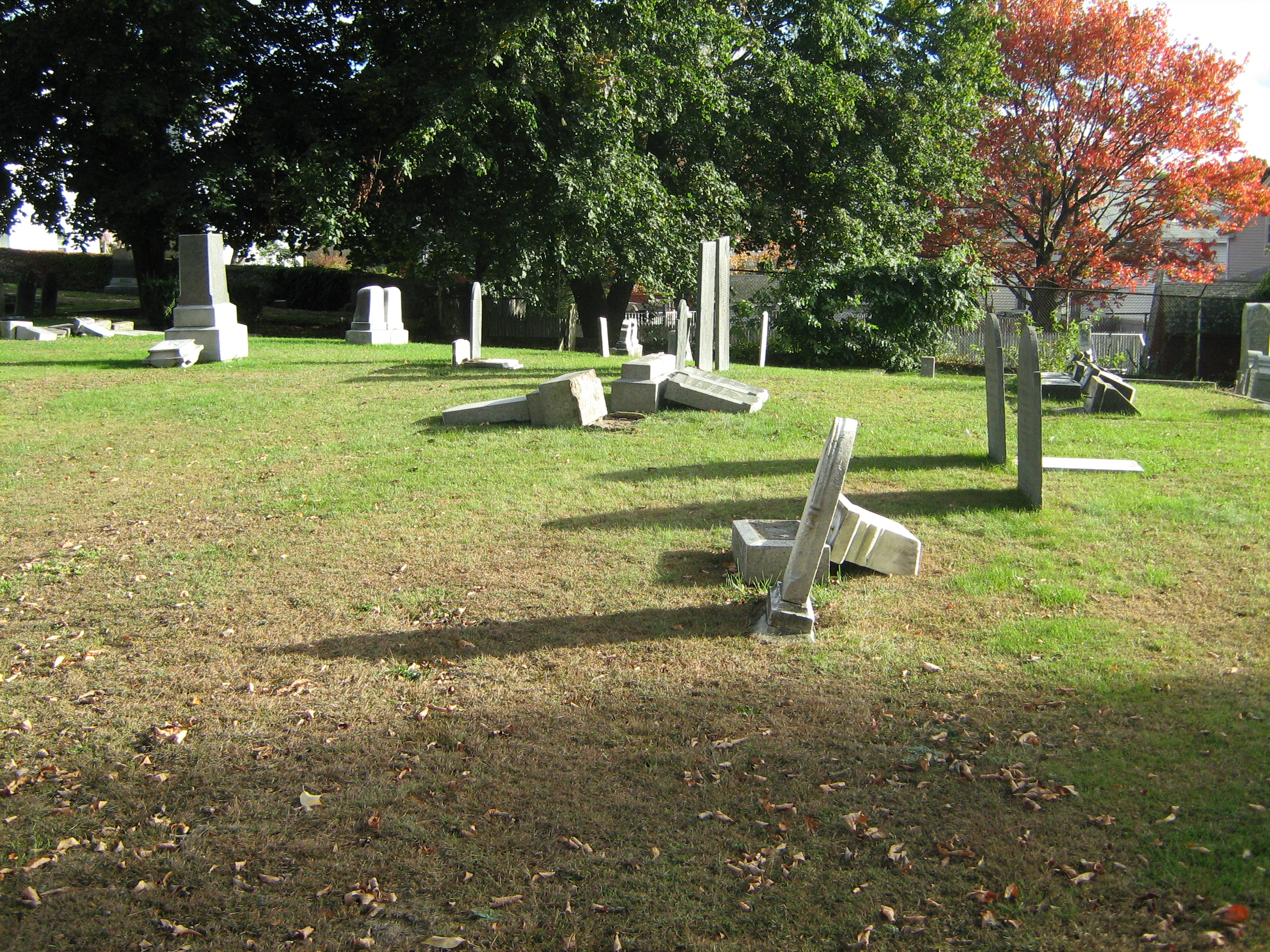
Vandalized headstones at Hildreth Cemetery, October 2009

On October 3, 2009, a teenager from Centralville became angry over a "personal matter" and damaged over 150 headstones in Hildreth Cemetery, many of them around two centuries old. Ninety of them were damaged beyond repair due to age or the materials they were made from (some older ones carved in slate, others in marble). The cost of the damage was estimated to be around $10,000. The Hildreth Family Cemetery, gated and locked all year, was untouched. The perpetrator turned himself in two weeks later upon seeing pictures of the destroyed headstones in the Lowell Sun.

In June 2010, the town of Dracut authorized the allocation of $30,000 towards the repair of Hildreth Cemetery, so that the work would begin before the winter. In October, work began on the restoration. Several stones were repaired on site, as they were merely knocked over or were easily repaired, but those damaged beyond repair were flagged for replacement by Hudson Monuments in Hudson, New Hampshire. Much of the work was completed by March 2011.

== Hildreth Family Cemetery ==
The Hildreth family's private cemetery is set behind the public cemetery and entered via two locked gates accessible only from Hildreth Street. The cemetery is closed all year, with the exception of the annual commemoration of General Butler's birthday and the replacement of the flag, held the first Sunday in November.

Several generations of the Hildreth family are buried in the cemetery. The more well-known members include:

- Benjamin Butler (1818–1893): A controversial Union general during the American Civil War and later a Congressman and Governor of Massachusetts. He married Sarah Hildreth (1816–1876) in 1844.
- Adelbert Ames (1835–1933): A highly decorated Union general during the Civil War, who served as a U.S. Senator and Governor of Mississippi during Reconstruction. He married Butler's daughter Blanche (1847–1939) in 1870, while serving in the Senate. (Ames' date of birth is erroneously listed on the monument as October 30 while all known records, as well as the Medal of Honor plaque at the base of the monument, list his birthday as October 31.)
- Charlotte Ellison Butler (1782–1870): Benjamin Butler's mother.
- Andrew Jackson Butler (1815–1864): Benjamin Butler's elder brother, a colonel in the United States Army who accompanied him to New Orleans and died of fever in February 1864.
- Dr. Israel Hildreth (1791–1859): Noted physician of the Greater Lowell area, and father of Sarah Hildreth Butler.
- Benjamin and Sarah Hildreth Butler's other three children, all sons:
  - The first Paul Butler (1845–1850)
  - The second Paul Butler (1852–1918): Inventor and businessman.
  - Ben-Israel Butler (1855–1881): West Point graduate (1877) and lawyer who died before he was able to practice.
- Five of Adelbert and Blanche Butler Ames' children:
  - Butler Ames (1871–1954): West Point graduate (1894) and Colonel in the U.S. Army during the Spanish–American War and Congressman from Massachusetts. His wife Fifille Willis Ames (1886–1940) is buried alongside him.
  - Edith Ames Stevens (1873–1958) and her husband C. Brooks Stevens (1864–1949)
  - Sarah Ames (1874–1931)
  - Blanche Ames Ames (1878–1969): Artist and suffragist, who wrote the first full-length biography on her father in response to the biased interpretation of his administration of Mississippi in John F. Kennedy's Profiles in Courage.
  - Jessie Ames Marshall (1882–1967)

Ames' youngest son, Adelbert Ames, Jr., has his name inscribed on the monument; however, he is actually buried at the cemetery on the grounds of Dartmouth College in Hanover, New Hampshire.

== Gallery ==
A warning against grave robbing and disrespect, on the inner gate to the Hildreth family cemetery, it reads "Those who harm or rob a grave, from God's just wrath no one can save, bad luck comes to those who thread, with careless steps above the dead."

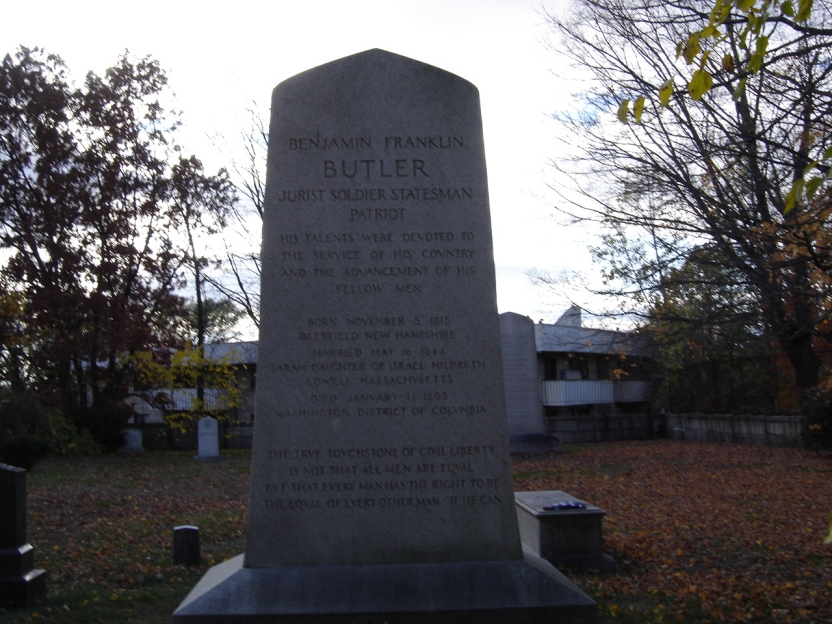
The inscription on the front side of the monument of Benjamin Butler

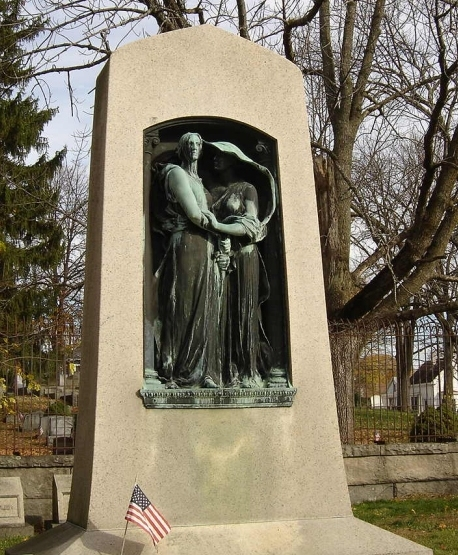
The sculpture on the rear of General Butler's monument

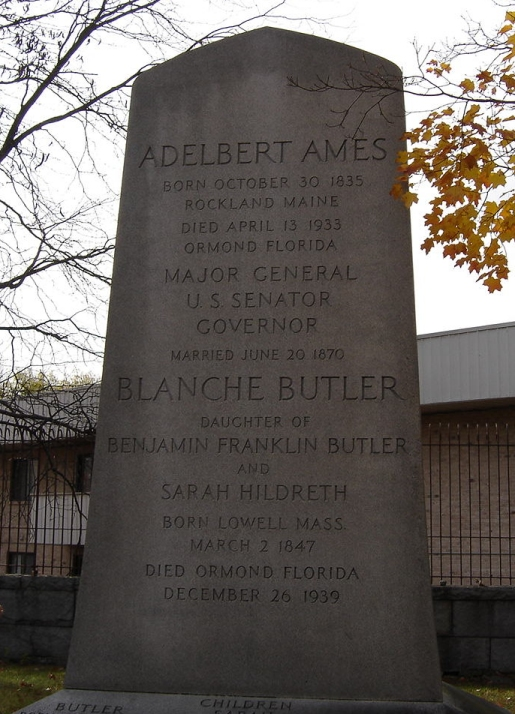
The grave of Adelbert Ames and his family

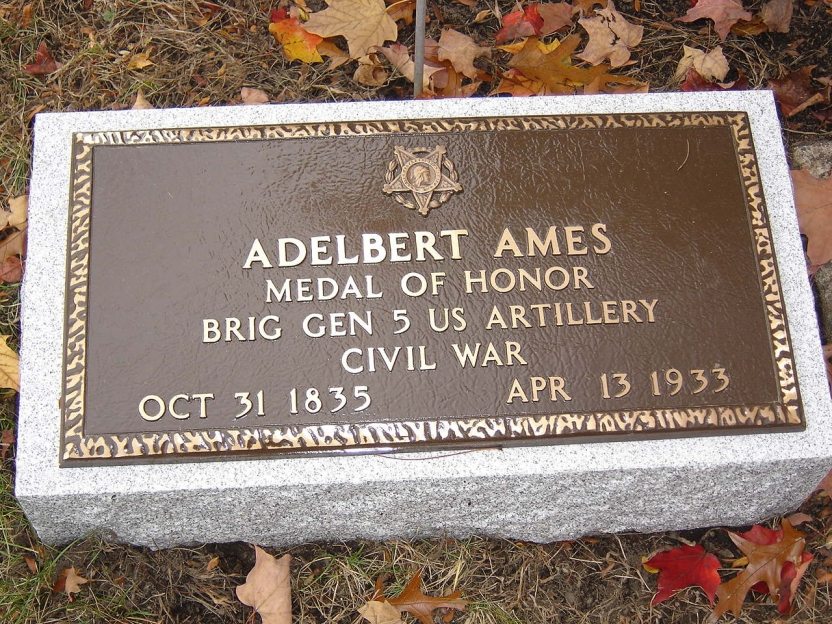
Ames' Medal of Honor plaque, installed in 2009

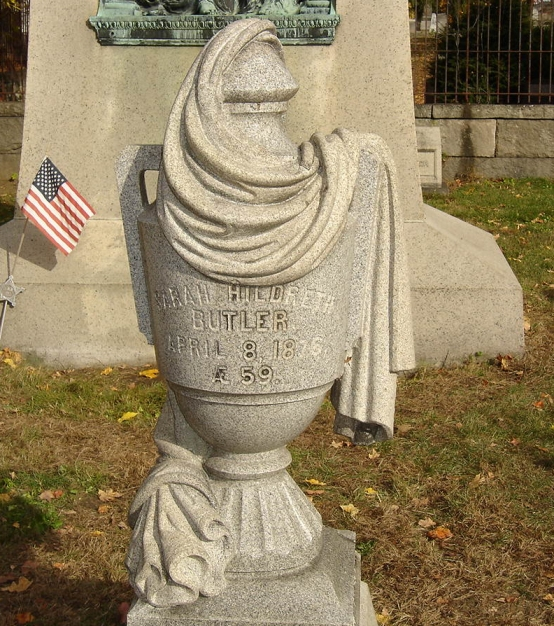
The grave of Sarah Hildreth Butler, Benjamin's wife
