= Blanche Ames Ames =

American artist, political activist, inventor, writer

- Blanche Ames, ca. 1895
- Born: Blanche Ames; February 18, 1878; Lowell, Massachusetts, US
- Died: March 2, 1969 (aged 91); North Easton, Massachusetts, US
- Education: Smith College
- Occupations: Artist, political activist, inventor, writer
- Spouse: Oakes Ames
- Children: 4
- Parents: Adelbert Ames; Blanche Butler Ames

Blanche Ames Ames (February 18, 1878 – March 2, 1969) was an American artist, political activist, inventor, writer, and prominent supporter of women's suffrage and birth control.

== Personal life ==
Born Blanche Ames in Lowell, Massachusetts, Ames was the daughter of Adelbert Ames, a West Point graduate who became a Union army general and Governor of Mississippi during the Reconstruction era, and Blanche Butler Ames, who attended the Academy of the Visitation and enjoyed painting and the arts. The fourth of six children, she was the sister of Adelbert Ames Jr., a prominent scientist. She was also granddaughter to Union army general and Massachusetts Governor Benjamin Butler and actress Sarah Hildreth Butler.

Ames attended the Rogers Hall School in Lowell. She was later one of few women of her time to attend college, earning a B.A. in Art History and a diploma in Studio Art from Smith College in 1899. She was the president of her graduating class.

In 1900, she married Harvard University botany professor Oakes Ames (no relation). She took the married name Blanche Ames Ames. Ames illustrated her husband's botanical research on orchids. The Ameses had four children: Pauline (born 1901), Oliver (born 1903), Amyas (born 1906), and Evelyn (born 1910). Ames managed her professional work and family by having a studio at home and hiring domestic servants to assist her with domestic work.

Ames' daughter, Pauline, grew up to write many books about her family, including "Oakes Ames, Jottings of a Harvard Botanist" (1979), and "The Plimpton Papers, Law and Diplomacy" (1985). One of Ames' grandchildren was George Ames Plimpton, famed sportswriter.

Ames is buried in the Hildreth Family Cemetery in Lowell.

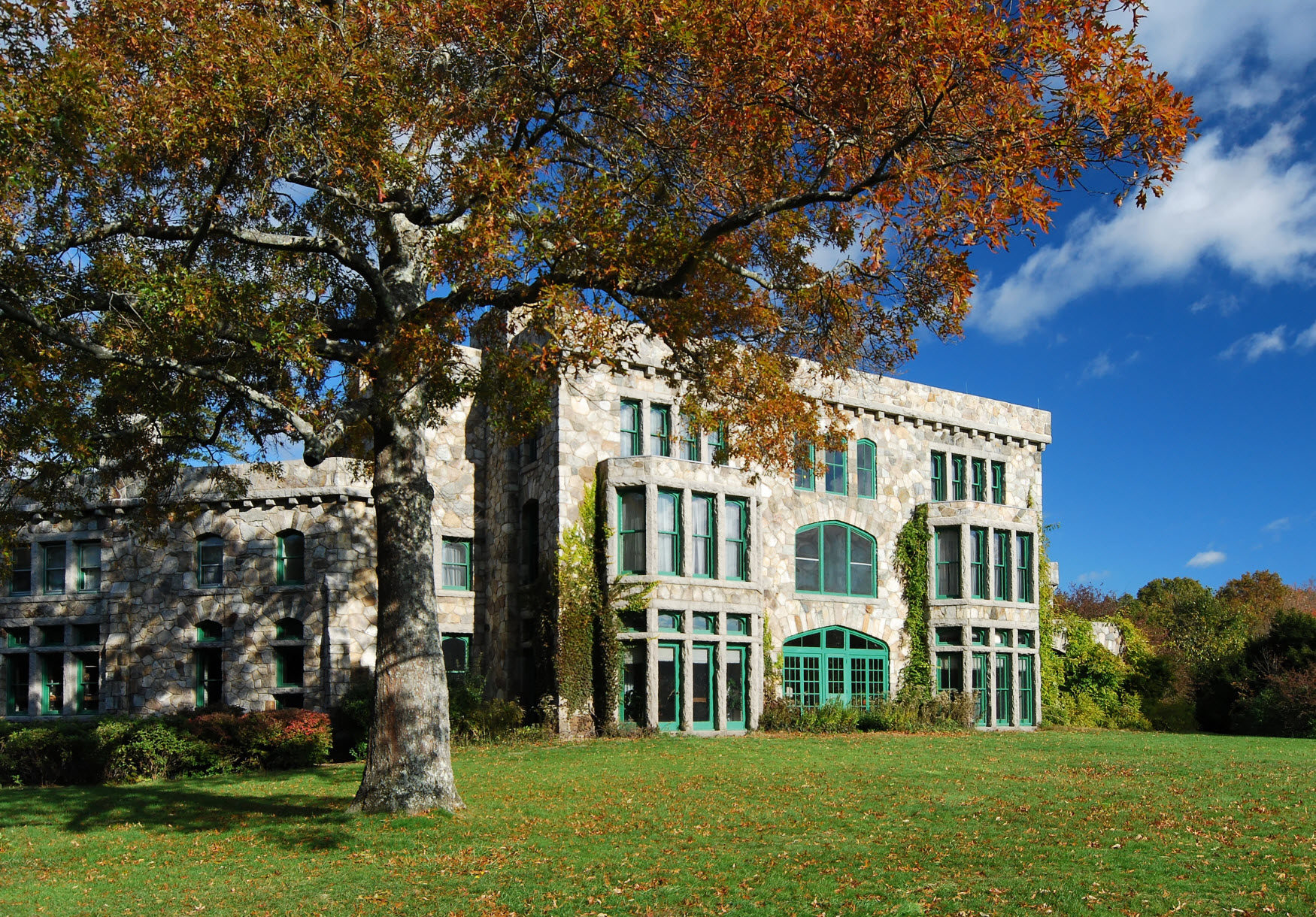
The Oakes Ames estate is now Borderland State Park

The Ames estate, which includes Blanche Ames' art studio, in North Easton, Massachusetts is called Borderland. The estate was designed by Ames herself in the early 1900s. It is now open to the public as Borderland State Park.

== Artist ==
Ames was a talented artist in a variety of media. Her work included portraiture, primarily done in oil paint, botanical illustration, and political cartoons. She had a studio in her home in North Easton, Massachusetts.

Though introduced to art through her mother Blanche Ames's lifelong interest in painting, Blanche Ames Ames first became seriously interested in practicing art as a college student. Praised by her professors and classmates, she began to envision her life as an artist. Through her persistence, and with the encouragement her husband Oakes (who gifted her with an extravagant set of books on famous artists while courting her) this vision became reality.

Beyond the knowledge of art history she gained at Smith, Ames was well aware of artists of her own time. In Boston, she sat for a portrait by prominent American Impressionist Edmund C. Tarbell in 1906. She attended the armory show of modern art in New York City in 1913. Though not a part of the circle of women producing suffrage cartoons in New York, who were connected through Heterodoxy and other organizations, she kept close watch on their work and other efforts toward suffrage in both England and America, hiring a newspaper clipping service to save suffrage news from 1915 to 1916.

In 1902, she began illustrating Oakes Ames's botanical publications, including his seven volume treatise on orchids, which is still considered one of the best researched to this day. Previously he had illustrated the orchids himself with watercolor. Blanche Ames Ames first used watercolors for the orchid illustrations, but later switched to copperplate etching. She also published detailed pen and ink drawings of the orchids. The illustrations were drawn from dried plant specimens observed through a camera lucida. Blanche Ames Ames continued to illustrate orchids throughout their life together, eventually designing the decorations which now appear at both of their graves.

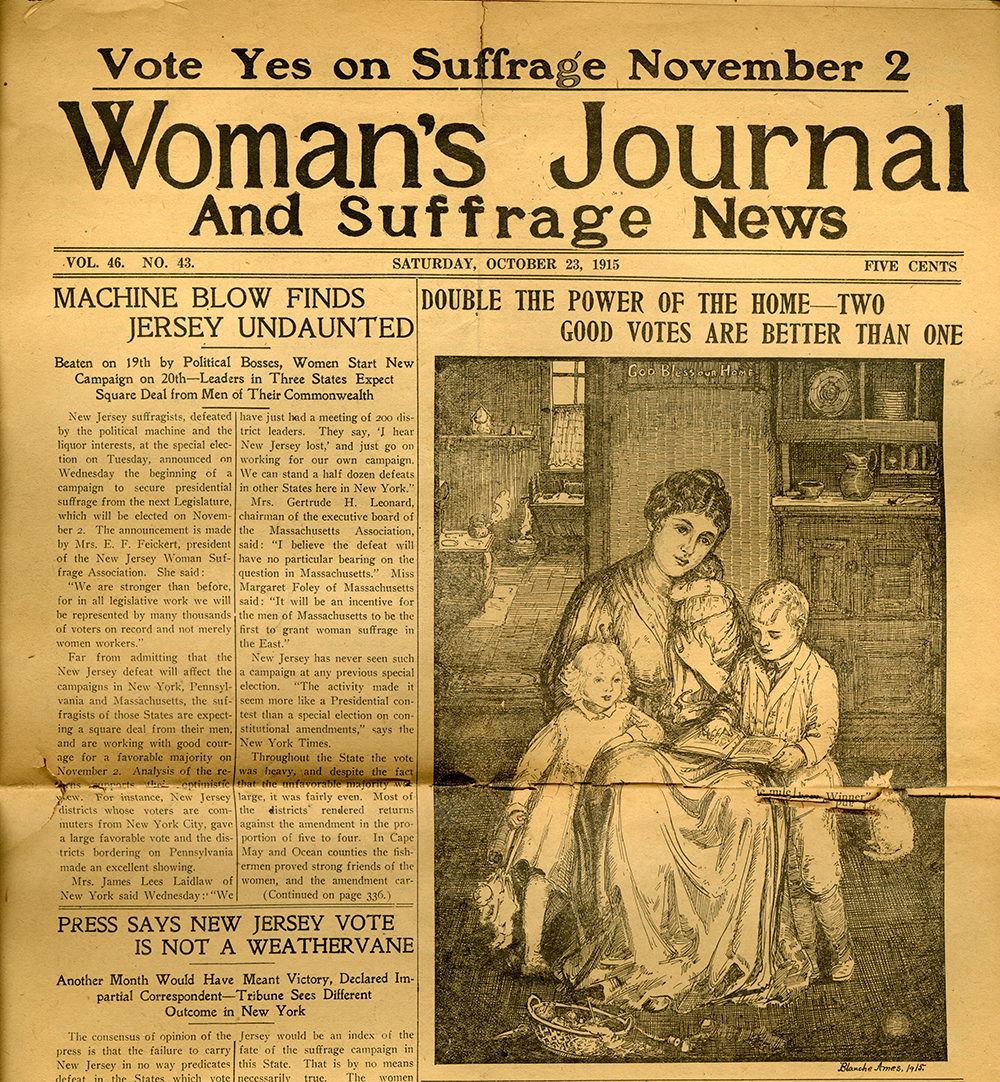
Blanche Ames, "Double the Power of the Home -- Two Good Votes are Better Than One," 1915, Link to image and information: https://images.socialwelfare.library.vcu.edu/items/show/128

During the 1910s Blanche Ames Ames produced a number of political cartoons promoting women's suffrage, which appeared in publications including Woman's Journal, and the Boston American. In 1915 she became the art editor of Woman's Journal (along with Fredrikke Palmer and Mayme B. Harwood). Three years before in 1912, the Woman's Journal's offices had relocated its headquarters from New York to nearby Boston. Ames' work called, "Cradle of Liberty", was selected to be the state's suffrage poster. Political cartoons like Ames' were essential to winning women's voting rights.

Ames's etchings are on display at the Metropolitan Museum of Art, and her oil painting can be seen at Harvard, Dartmouth, and Columbia University.

== Women's rights activist ==
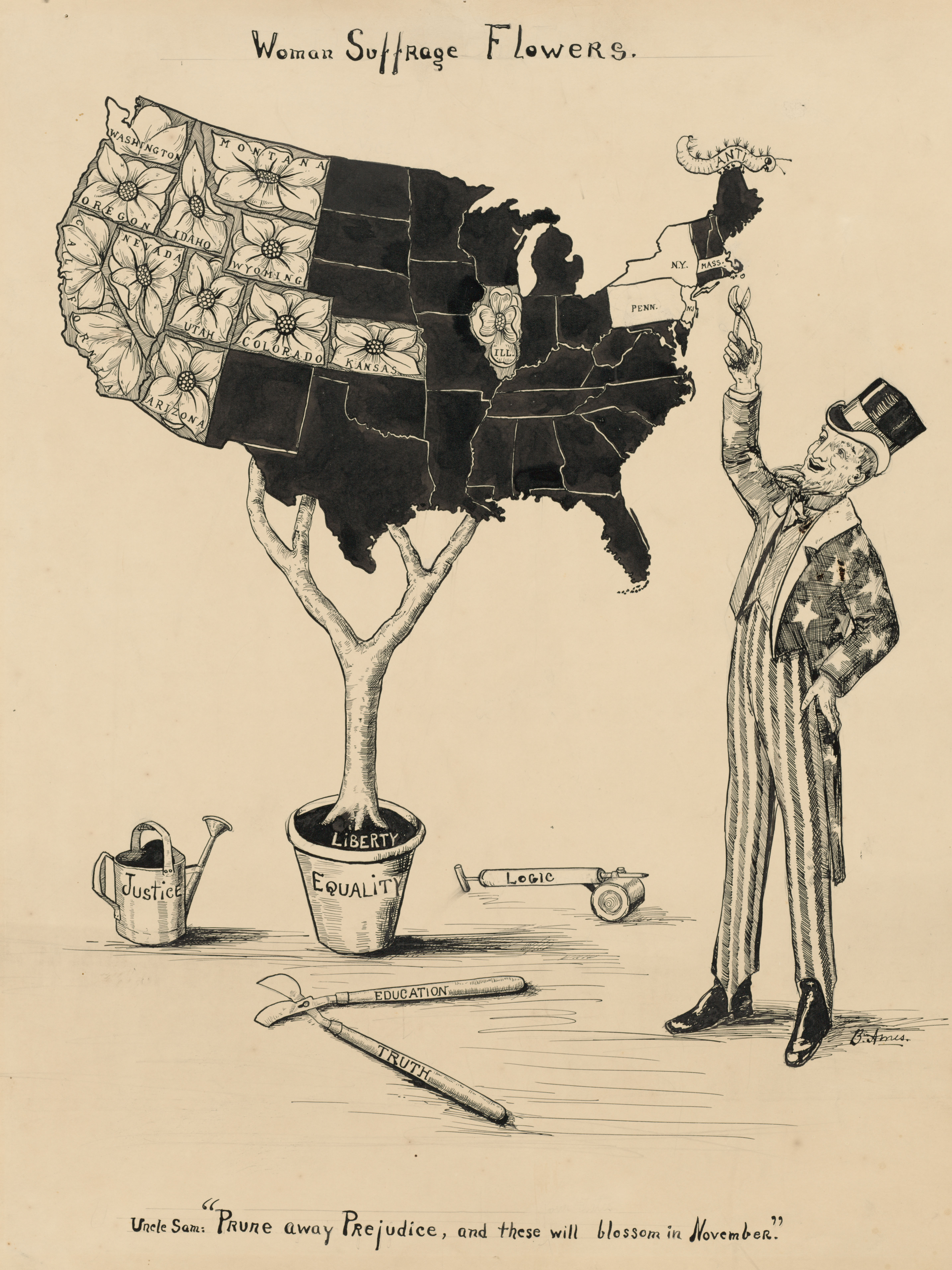
"Women Suffrage Flowers" poster by Blanche Ames about 1910

Ames held a lifelong passion for women's rights. including women's voting rights. In 1915, when Massachusetts voters would decide whether to allow women the right to vote, Blanche attended 40 events throughout the commonwealth to spread the word of female equality. She was president of the Easton Woman Suffrage League, and, from 1915 to 1918, she was Treasurer of the Massachusetts Woman Suffrage League. Ames lobbied for women's voting rights at a Republican National Convention. She combined her art with her activism as the art editor of the longest running women's rights newspaper, the Woman's Journal. From 1913 through 1916, Ames hired a news clipping service to collect suffrage news, including cartoons, to inspire her work.

Ames also supported birth control. In 1916 she helped found the Birth Control League of Massachusetts, an affiliate of Margaret Sanger's group, the American Birth Control League, and served as first President. In this role Ames helped to form The Doctors Bill to Clarify the Law, which regulated the ability of doctors to provide birth control counseling to married women with health problems, and later helped establish universal access to birth control. Massachusetts did not legalize contraception for married women until 1966, the last state in the nation to do so, and Ames set the standard for perseverance in the decades-long effort.

In 1941 Ames also served as a board member and later as President of the New England Hospital for Women and Children in Boston. NEH was managed by women serving purposely only women and children. They intended to give medical care services to the same sex . In 1952 because of financial circumstances they opened up to the possibility of employing male staff. Ames fought to keep the hospital as only female staff and administration through funding methods.

== Inventor ==
Ames held patents for inventions which included a hexagonal lumber cutter and a method for entrapping enemy aircraft.

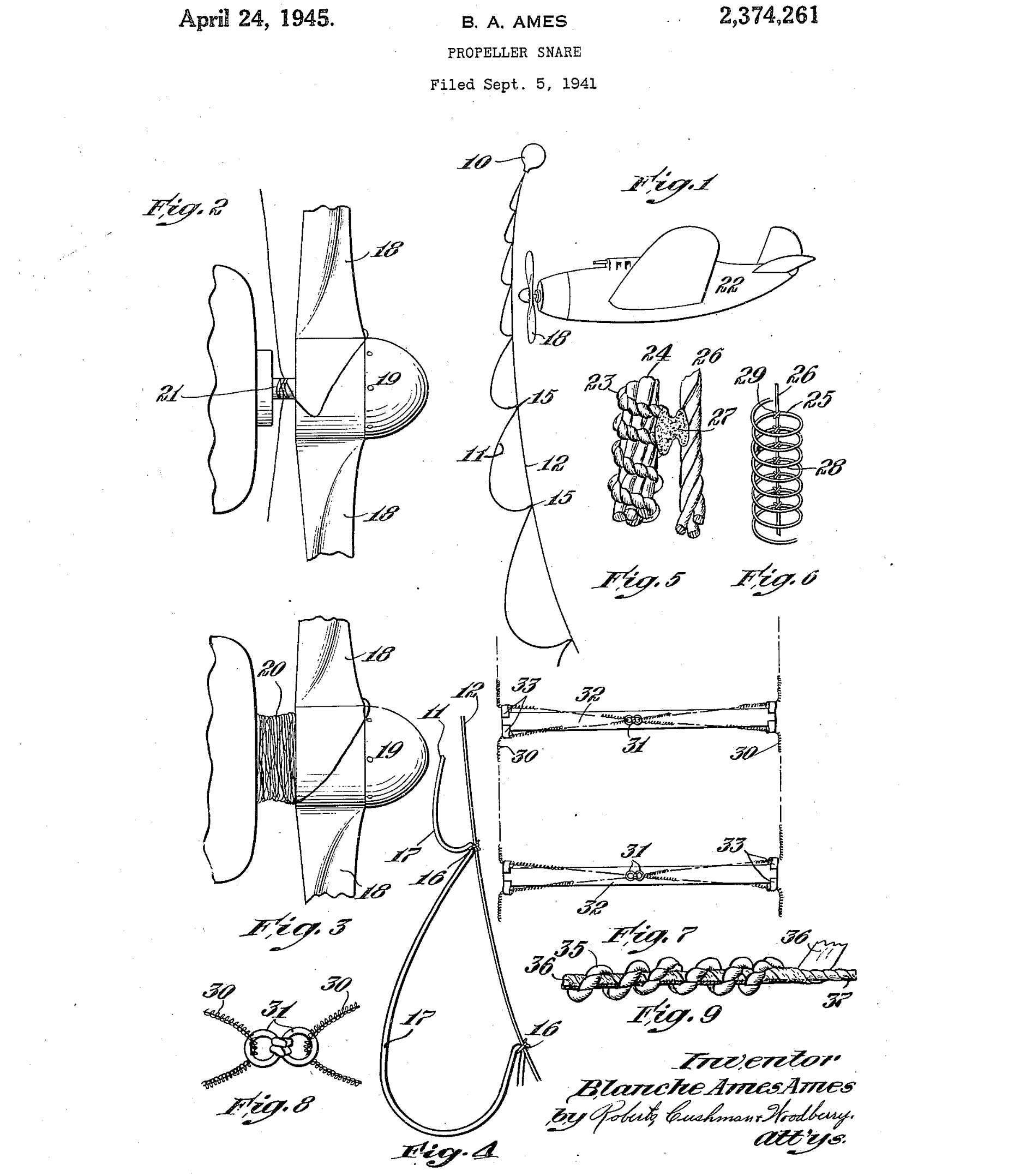
Blanche A. Ames "Propeller Snare" drawings for her US Patent

During World War II, Ames came across the realization that thread could snarl and jam a sewing machine motor, Blanche then used that same principle to design a device to ensnare low-flying aircraft. The machine was demonstrated on the lawn at Borderland for guests from the Pentagon. Although it was accepted by the U.S. Army, it came too late for it to be applied in war.

=== The Ames color system ===
In the early 1910s Ames' brother, Adelbert Ames Jr., a scientist particularly interested in vision, moved into her studio for painting lessons. With her brother, Ames began to develop a color notation system more extensive than the Munsell color system. Together the two created coded color swatches which corresponded to particular tubes of paint. The artist would use these swatches to select the most realistic colors and the codes would be mapped out on a drawing before the paint was applied. Blanche Ames Ames first put this system to use in a painting in 1912. She continued to use this color notation after her collaboration with her brother had concluded.

== Author ==
At age 80, Ames wrote a biography about her father, Adelbert Ames, called: "Adelbert Ames, 1835–1933; General, Senator, Governor, the story of his life and times and his integrity as a soldier and statesman in the service of the United States of America throughout the Civil War and in Mississippi in the years of Reconstruction" (1964). She wrote the biography in response to John F. Kennedy's 1956 book Profiles in Courage. Profiles criticized Adelbert Ames in favor of his Reconstruction Era rival Lucius Quintus Cincinnatus Lamar, a key leader of the "Mississippi Plan" that suppressed African-American voter turnout and ultimately led to Adelbert Ames's resignation as governor of Mississippi. Prior to publishing the book, Ames had frequently written Kennedy asking him to retract his criticism of her father in order to "bring your views into accord with the trend of modern historical interpretation of the Reconstruction Period.”

== Patents ==
- US1612791A, Ames, Blanche Ames & Ames Jr, Adelbert, "System of color standards", issued 4 January 1927
- US2374261A, Ames, Blanche Ames, "Propeller snare", issued 24 May 1945. - Archived version
- US3488780A, Ames, Blanche Ames & Davis, Evelyn Ames, "Apparatus for antipollution of sewage systems at toilet source", issued 13 January 1970
