= Blanche Butler Ames =

First Lady of Mississippi

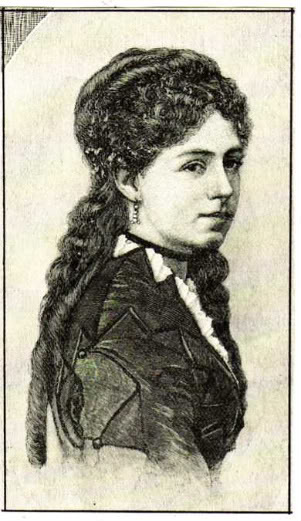
- Born: March 2, 1847; Lowell, Massachusetts, U.S.
- Died: December 26, 1939 (aged 92); Ormond Beach, Florida, U.S.
- Burial place: Hildreth Cemetery, Lowell, Massachusetts, U.S.
- Occupation: Author
- Spouse: Adelbert Ames (m. 1870; died 1933)
- Children: 6, including Butler Ames, Blanche Ames Ames, and Adelbert Ames Jr.

Blanche Butler Ames (March 2, 1847 – December 26, 1939) was an author and wife of Adelbert Ames, a decorated Union general in the American Civil War and senator and governor of Mississippi during Reconstruction.

Blanche Butler was born in Lowell, Massachusetts, the second child and only daughter of Sarah Jones (née Hildreth) and Benjamin Butler, who served as a Union general in the Civil War. She attended school in Lowell until she was sent to the Academy of the Visitation in Washington, D.C. at age 13, where she described the sectional tension between northern and southern students on the eve of the Civil War.

Blanche met Adelbert Ames, who had served under her father in the Army of the James, while he was serving as senator from Mississippi during Reconstruction. They married at Saint Anne's Episcopal Church in Lowell, the same church where her parents had wed, on July 21, 1870, and they had six children: Butler, Edith, Sarah, Blanche, Adelbert, Jr., and Jessie. When her husband was elected governor of Mississippi in 1873, Blanche accompanied him and wrote a series of letters detailing her experiences as a Northern woman living in the South during Reconstruction. After Adelbert resigned under pressure in 1876, the Ames family returned to Lowell to pursue business interests, where they remained for much the rest of their lives.

After her husband's death in 1933, Mrs. Ames compiled a collection of their letters, released by the family as Chronicles from the Nineteenth Century: Family Letters of Blanche Butler and Adelbert Ames in 1957. She also compiled a detailed account of the Butler ancestry in 1895. She died at the Ames winter home in Ormond Beach, Florida, on December 26, 1939, at age 92, and is buried beside her husband and their children at the Hildreth family cemetery in Lowell, across from her parents and siblings.
