= Lowell Airport (Massachusetts) =

Former airport in Massachusetts

- IATA: none; ICAO: none

Summary
- Operator: Private
- Location: Lowell, Massachusetts
- Built: Unknown
- In use: 1928-1947
- Occupants: Private
- Elevation AMSL: 102 ft / 31 m
- Coordinates: 42°36′41.36″N 71°17′32.74″W
- Interactive map of Lowell Airport

Lowell Airport was an airfield operational in the mid-20th century in Lowell, Massachusetts. The airport hosted the Moth Aircraft Corp. of Lowell, where 179 de Havilland Moth planes were manufactured under license between 1929 and 1931.
