= Sarah Hildreth Butler =

American stage actress (1816–1876)

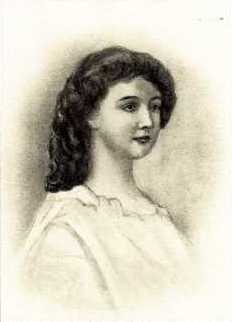
- Born: Sarah Jones Hildreth; August 17, 1816; Dracut, Massachusetts, United States
- Died: April 8, 1876 (aged 59); Massachusetts, U.S.
- Resting place: Hildreth Cemetery, Lowell, Massachusetts
- Occupation: Stage actress
- Spouse: Benjamin Butler (m. 1844)
- Children: 4, including Blanche

Sarah Hildreth Butler (born Sarah Jones Hildreth, August 17, 1816 – April 8, 1876) was an American stage actress. She was the wife of Benjamin Butler, a Massachusetts lawyer, controversial Union general in the American Civil War, and a United States Congressman representing Massachusetts from 1867 to 1875 and again from 1877 to 1879.

== Life ==
Sarah Hildreth was born in Dracut, Massachusetts, the daughter of Dr. Israel Hildreth, a physician in the Lowell area, and Dolly Jones. At sixteen, she went to Boston for formal training in dramatics and later performed all around the country. On May 16, 1844, she married Benjamin Butler, then a rising lawyer, at Saint Anne's Episcopal Church in Lowell; she was 27, he 25. The Butlers had four children, three surviving to adulthood: Blanche (1847–1939), who would marry Adelbert Ames; Paul (1852–1918; their first son, also named Paul, had died in 1850 at the age of five); and Ben-Israel (1855–1881). She retired from stage performance after her marriage.

Benjamin Butler served as a Union general during the American Civil War and then, at Sarah's urging, pursued his political ambitions. In March 1866, Butler argued in the U.S. Supreme Court on behalf of the United States in Ex parte Milligan, in which the Court held, against the United States, that military commission trials could not replace civilian trials when civilian courts were operating. Butler then turned his eyes to Congress and was elected in 1866 on a platform of civil rights and opposition to President Andrew Johnson's weak Reconstruction policies. Sarah encouraged Benjamin's support for social reform, including women's suffrage and the eight-hour workday for federal employees.

=== Death ===
Sarah Hildreth Butler died on April 8, 1876, at the age of 59, and is buried at her family's private cemetery in Lowell.
