= Alexander Kelso Davis =

American politician (died 1884)

A. K. Davis
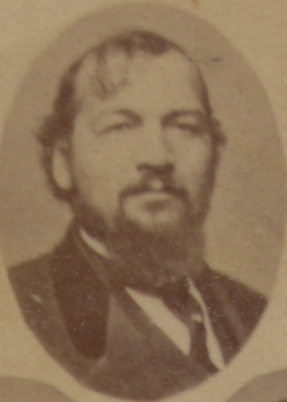
- Official portrait, 1874

8th Lieutenant Governor of Mississippi
- In office January 22, 1874 – March 16, 1876
- Governor: Adelbert Ames
- Preceded by: Joseph Bennett (acting)
- Succeeded by: John M. Stone

Member of the Mississippi House of Representatives from Noxubee County
- In office 1870–1874 Serving with Marshall McNeese (1870‍–‍1872); Isham Stewart (1870‍–‍1874); J. W. Chandler (1872‍–‍1874)
- Preceded by: J. J. Beauchamp
- Succeeded by: Thomas A. Cotton

Personal details
- Born: Alexander Kelso Davis
- Died: November 20, 1884 Canton, Mississippi, U.S.
- Political party: Republican
- Occupation: Lawyer; politician; pastor

Alexander Kelso Davis (died November 20, 1884) was an American politician. He was a member of the Mississippi House of Representatives and Lieutenant Governor of Mississippi. He was impeached and removed by the resurgent Democrats towards the end of the Reconstruction era in 1876. He was the first African American to serve as lieutenant governor in Mississippi.

He was a lawyer from Tennessee. He came to Mississippi in 1869 and lived in Noxubee County. He served in the Mississippi House of Representatives from 1870 until 1873. He served as Lieutenant Governor of Mississippi from 1872 , succeeding Ridgley C. Powers, and served until he resigned as he faced impeachment in 1876. Resurgent Democrats took back control and impeached him to prevent him becoming governor once they removed Governor Adelbert Ames. The official allegation of his impeachment had been accepting a bribe to pardon a convicted murderer. He left politics and became a pastor where he served until his death in 1884.

== See also ==
- African American officeholders from the end of the Civil War until before 1900
- List of lieutenant governors of Mississippi
- List of minority governors and lieutenant governors in the United States

Mississippi House of Representatives
Preceded by J. J. Beauchamp	Member of the Mississippi House of Representatives from Noxubee County; 1870–1874; With: Marshall McNeese, 1870‍–‍1872; Isham Stewart, 1870‍–‍1874; J. W. Chandler, 1872‍–‍1874	Succeeded by Thomas A. Cotton
Mississippi State Senate
Preceded by Joseph Bennett as President Pro Tempore of the Mississippi State Senate	President of the Mississippi State Senate; 1874–1876	Succeeded by John M. Stone
Political offices
Vacant following 1871 succession of incumbent to the governorship Title last held by Ridgley C. Powers	Lieutenant Governor of Mississippi; 1874–1876	Succeeded by John M. Stone
