= Marshall McNeese =

American politician

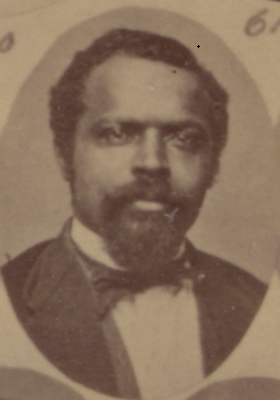
- Official portrait, 1874

Member of the Mississippi House of Representatives from Noxubee County
- In office 1874–1878 Serving with J. W. Chandler (1874‍–‍1876); Thomas A. Cotton (1874‍–‍1876); H. L. Jarnagin (1876‍–‍1878); Lawrence Overton (1876‍–‍1878)
- Preceded by: Isham Stewart
- Succeeded by: W. B. Augustus
- In office 1870–1872 Serving with Isham Stewart and A. K. Davis
- Preceded by: J. J. Beauchamp
- Succeeded by: J. W. Chandler

Personal details
- Political party: Republican
- Occupation: Carpenter; politician

Marshall McNeese served as a state legislator in Mississippi during the 1870s.

McNeese was born in Georgia and is documented as having been a carpenter and illiterate. He represented Noxubee County, Mississippi from 1870 to 1871 and from 1874 to 1877.

== See also ==
- African American officeholders from the end of the Civil War until before 1900
