= Roseacres, Mississippi =

- Unincorporated community
- Location within Mississippi Location within the United States
- Coordinates: 34°23′44″N 90°27′00″W
- Country: United States
- State: Mississippi
- County: Coahoma
- Elevation: 177 ft (54 m)
- Time zone: UTC-6 (Central (CST))
  - Summer (DST): UTC-5 (CDT)
- GNIS feature ID: 676869

Roseacres is an unincorporated community in Coahoma County, Mississippi, United States.

The settlement was first called "Mound Place", and then "Priddy", before being renamed Roseacres.

== History ==
In 1844, James L. Alcorn established a cotton plantation here called "Mound Place". He also opened a law office in nearby Friars Point. Alcorn would later become governor of Mississippi.

Mound Place had a post office from 1854 to 1871.

In 1863, during the American Civil War, forces of the Union Army were desperate to capture Vicksburg, located about 75 mi (121 km) south on the Mississippi River. The Yazoo Pass Expedition sent Union gunboats into Yazoo Pass, which flowed next to Mound Place, in an attempt to follow a circuitous route of waterways down to Vicksburg. Union forces progressed as far as Greenwood, where a Confederate steamer was scuttled to block their progress. During the weeks when Union ships were passing Mound Place, first on their advance and then on their retreat, Mound Place was used as a temporary camp by Union soldiers. It was reported that the soldiers slaughtered Alcorn's cattle to feed their troops, rolled his carriages into Yazoo Pass, and destroyed his fences.

The Mobile and Northwestern Railroad was laid in the 1870s, and a station was established at Mound Place called "Priddy". The line was abandoned in 1983.

An outbreak of smallpox occurred at Roseacres in 1882, with 20 cases noted and five deaths.

The United States Nursery Company purchased the plantation in 1910, and the settlement was renamed "Roseacres". It became the largest rose plantation in the southern United States, with over 700 acres (280 ha) of land used to grow roses which were shipped across the United States. The company ceased operations in 1924.

The Roseacres post office existed from 1910–24.

== Gallery ==
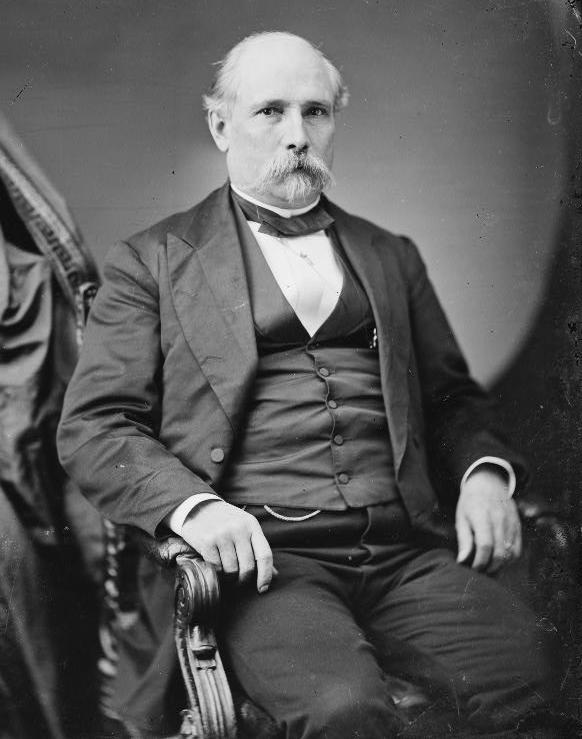
James L. Alcorn

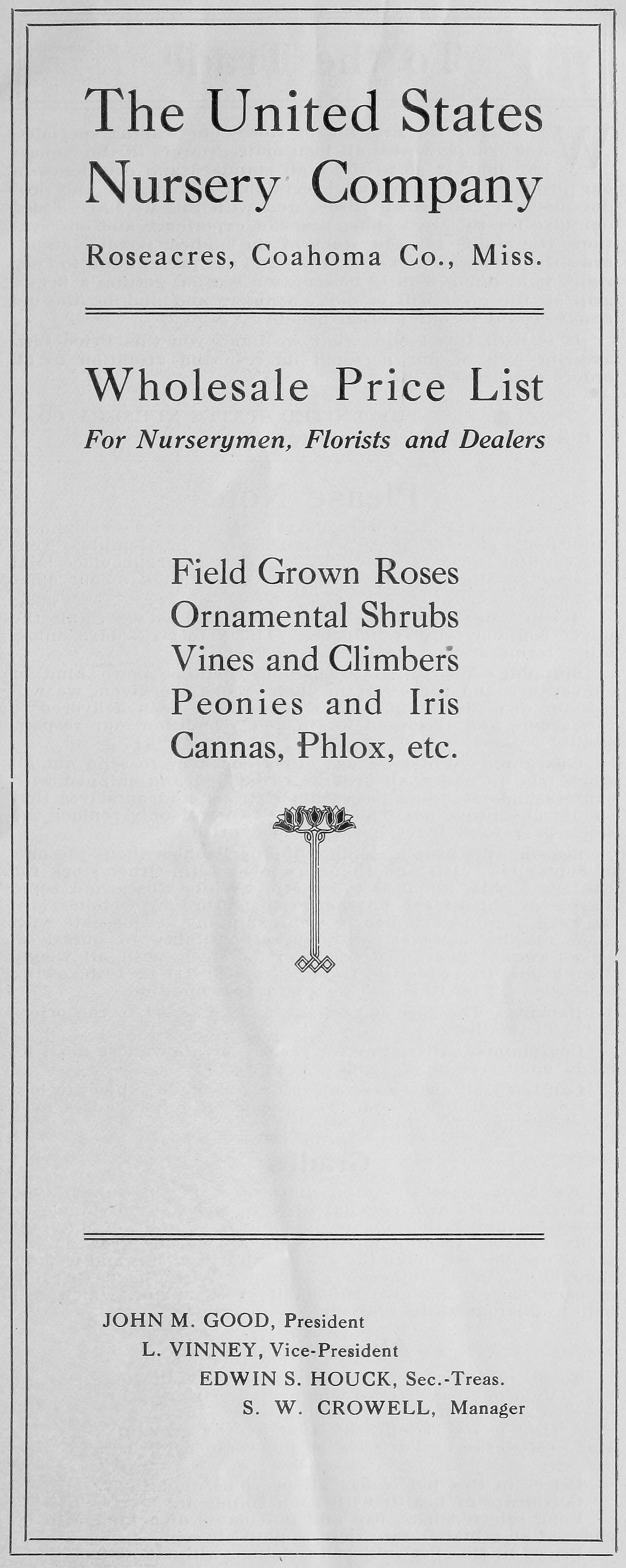
Cover of 1915 "United States Nursery Company" catalog
