= 1869 Mississippi gubernatorial election =

- November 30–December 2, 1869
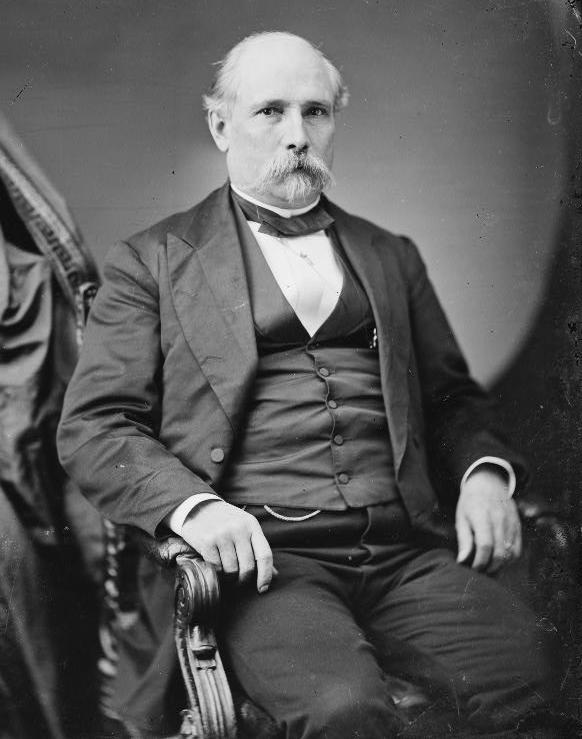

| Nominee | James L. Alcorn | Lewis Dent |
| Party | Republican | National Union Republican |
| Alliance | | Democratic |
| Popular vote | 76,186 | 38,097 |
| Percentage | 66.66% | 33.34% |
- County results Alcorn: 50–60% 60–70% 70–80% 80–90% >90% Dent: 50–60% 60–70% 70–80% 80–90% No returns
Governor before election
Adelbert Ames
Republican
Elected Governor
James L. Alcorn
Republican

The 1869 Mississippi gubernatorial election was held from November 30 to December 2, 1869, in order to elect the Governor of Mississippi. James L. Alcorn, Republican and moderate planter who had previously served in the Confederate Army, defeated National Union Republican Party nominee Judge Lewis Dent, the brother-in-law of President Ulysses S. Grant and former Union Army official. The Democratic Party supported Dent rather than nominating their own candidate. It was the first election following the Reconstruction era military governorship of Adelbert Ames.

== General election ==
The rapidly shifting political alliances of the post-Civil War period saw conservative white supremacists in both parties allied with Dent, while most African-Americans and some whites allied with Alcorn. The former Confederate Alcorn was more racially progressive than former Union Army official Dent, and civil rights for formerly enslaved African Americans defined the campaign. White terrorism, including murders by the Ku Klux Klan, occurred regularly throughout the campaign in violent opposition to the newly granted voting rights for African Americans. Following its 1869 constitutional convention, Mississippi also voted on a new state constitution, which granted expanded rights to African-Americans and paved the way for the establishment of new state institutions including public schools, and both houses of the state legislature on November 30, 1869.

=== Results ===
Mississippi gubernatorial election, 1869
| Party | Candidate | Votes | % |
|---|---|---|---|
| Republican | James L. Alcorn | 76,186 | 66.66 |
| National Union Republican | Lewis Dent | 38,097 | 33.34 |
| Total votes | | 114,283 | 100.00 |
| Republican hold | | | |
