= Governor Powers =

Governor Powers may refer to:

- Llewellyn Powers (1836–1908), 44th Governor of Maine
- Ridgley C. Powers (1836–1912), 29th Governor of Mississippi
