= Isham Stewart =

African American politician (1810–1893)

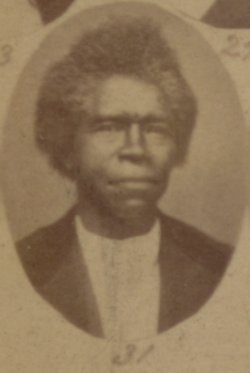
- Official portrait, 1874

Member of the Mississippi State Senate from the 17th district
- In office 1874–1878 Serving with H. W. Foote from 1876
- Preceded by: J. P. Gilmer
- Succeeded by: H. W. Foote

Member of the Mississippi House of Representatives from Noxubee County
- In office 1870–1874 Serving with A. K. Davis (1870‍–‍1874); Marshall McNeese (1870‍–‍1872); J. W. Chandler (1872‍–‍1874)
- Preceded by: J. J. Beauchamp
- Succeeded by: Marshall McNeese

Personal details
- Born: April 10, 1810
- Died: January 15, 1893 (aged 82)
- Political party: Republican
- Spouse: Ginsey Ingall
- Occupation: Minister; politician

Isham Stewart (April 10, 1810 – January 15, 1893), sometimes written as Isom Stewart, was a state legislator in Mississippi. He served in the Mississippi House of Representatives during the Reconstruction era and also served in the Mississippi Senate. He was the target of attacks from newspapers critical of African American politicians as well as so-called scalawags and carpetbaggers. His son served as deputy sheriff and was prosecuted under a law intended to target Ku Klux Klan members. His son Robert served as postmaster in Macon, Mississippi.

Stewart was one of the first black legislators in Mississippi, he was photographed. He represented Noxubee County.

He served as a delegate to the constitutional convention and signed Mississippi's Reconstruction era 1868 constitution.

== See also ==
- African American officeholders from the end of the Civil War until before 1900
