= Adelbert Ames =

Union Army general and politician (1835–1933)

- Portrait by Brady c. 1860–1865

27th and 30th Governor of Mississippi
- In office January 4, 1874 – March 29, 1876
- Lieutenant: Alexander K. Davis
- Preceded by: Ridgley C. Powers
- Succeeded by: John M. Stone
- In office June 15, 1868 – March 10, 1870
- Preceded by: Benjamin G. Humphreys
- Succeeded by: James L. Alcorn

United States Senator from Mississippi
- In office February 23, 1870 – January 10, 1874
- Preceded by: Jefferson Davis; Secession (vacant until 1870)
- Succeeded by: Henry R. Pease

Personal details
- Born: October 31, 1835 East Thomaston (now Rockland), Maine, U.S.
- Died: April 13, 1933 (aged 97) Ormond Beach, Florida, U.S.
- Resting place: Hildreth Family Cemetery in Lowell, Massachusetts; 42.660798°N 71.309928°W
- Party: Republican
- Spouse: Blanche Butler (m. 1870)
- Relations: Benjamin Franklin Butler (father-in-law)
- Children: Butler, Edith, Sarah, Blanche, Adelbert Jr., Jessie
- Education: United States Military Academy
- Profession: Military
- Awards: Medal of Honor

Military service
- Allegiance: United States
- Branch/service: U.S. Army (Union Army)
- Years of service: 1861–1870; 1898–1899
- Rank: Brigadier general Brevet major general
- Unit: 5th United States Artillery
- Commands: 20th Maine Volunteer Infantry; 2nd Brigade, 1st Division, XI Corps; 2nd Division, X Corps; 2nd Division, XXIV Corps; Fourth Military District; 3rd Brigade, 1st Division, Fifth Army Corps; 1st Division, Fifth Army Corps
- Battles/wars: See list: American Civil War; First Battle of Bull Run; Peninsula campaign; Siege of Yorktown; Battle of Gaines' Mill; Battle of Malvern Hill; Maryland Campaign; Battle of Antietam; Battle of Fredericksburg; Battle of Chancellorsville; Battle of Gettysburg; Bermuda Hundred Campaign; Overland Campaign; Second Battle of Petersburg; Second Battle of Fort Fisher; Spanish–American War; Siege of Santiago

Adelbert Ames (October 31, 1835 – April 13, 1933) was an American sailor, soldier, businessman and politician who served with distinction as a Union Army general during the American Civil War. A Radical Republican, he was a military governor, U.S. Senator, and civilian governor in Reconstruction-era Mississippi. In 1898, he served as a United States Army general during the Spanish–American War. He was the last Republican to serve as the state governor of Mississippi until the election of Kirk Fordice, who took office in January 1992, 116 years after Ames vacated the office.

A staunch supporter of political equality for African Americans, Ames's tenure as governor of Mississippi was a longstanding point of controversy in the historiography around Reconstruction, with the Dunning School and other "Lost Cause" historians casting him as a villain in American history. Conversely, his cause was championed by Black historians and, from the 1950s onward, other neo-abolitionist writers.

Ames was the penultimate surviving general officer of the Civil War, dying at the age of 97 in 1933. He was outlived only by Aaron Daggett, who died in 1938 at the age of 100. However, because Daggett was a brevet rank brigadier general of volunteers, Ames was the last surviving Civil War general who had held his rank in the regular U.S. or Confederate States army and was also the last surviving general of the conflict who had begun his career in the regular U.S. Army.

== Early life and career ==
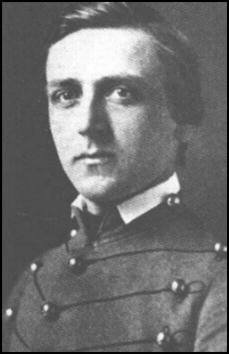
Ames as a West Point cadet

Adelbert (/əˈdɛlbərt/ ə-DEL-bərt) Ames was born in 1835 in the town of Rockland (then known as East Thomaston), located in Knox County, Maine. He was the younger of two sons of Martha Bradbury Ames and Jesse Ames, a sea captain who later purchased what became the Ames Mill (renowned as the producers of Malt-O-Meal) in Northfield, Minnesota. Adelbert Ames also grew up to be a sailor and became a mate on a clipper ship, and he also served briefly as a merchant seaman on his father's ship.

On July 1, 1856, he entered the United States Military Academy at West Point, New York; he graduated five years later in May 1861, fifth in his class of forty-five. Two classes had graduated that year due to the beginning of the Civil War in April. Ames's class had graduated about a month earlier than usual, while a second class, set to graduate in 1862, graduated on June 24, 1861.

== American Civil War ==
Ames in the Union Army c. 1861–1865

Ames was then commissioned a second lieutenant in the 2nd U.S. Artillery. Eight days later, he was promoted to first lieutenant and was assigned to the 5th U.S. Artillery. During the Battle of First Bull Run that July, Ames was seriously wounded in the right thigh but refused to leave his guns. He was brevetted to the rank of major on July 21 for his actions at Manassas. In 1893, Ames received the Medal of Honor for his performance there.

Returning to duty the following spring, Ames was part of the defenses of Washington, D.C. He then fought in the Peninsula Campaign and saw action at the Battle of Yorktown from April 5 to May 4, the Battle of Gaines' Mill on June 27, and the Battle of Malvern Hill that July. Ames was commended for his conduct at Malvern Hill by Col. Henry J. Hunt, chief of the artillery of the Army of the Potomac, and he received a brevet promotion to lieutenant colonel on July 1.

Although Ames was becoming an excellent artillery officer, he realized that significant promotions would be available only in the infantry. He returned to Maine and politicked to receive a commission as a regimental infantry commander and was assigned to command the 20th Maine Volunteer Infantry Regiment on August 20, 1862. The 20th Maine fought in the Maryland Campaign but saw little action at the Battle of Antietam on September 17 while in a reserve capacity. During the Union defeat at the Battle of Fredericksburg that winter, Ames led his regiment in one of the last charges on December 13 against Marye's Heights. During the Chancellorsville Campaign in May 1863, Ames volunteered as an aide-de-camp to Maj. Gen. George G. Meade, commander of the V Corps.

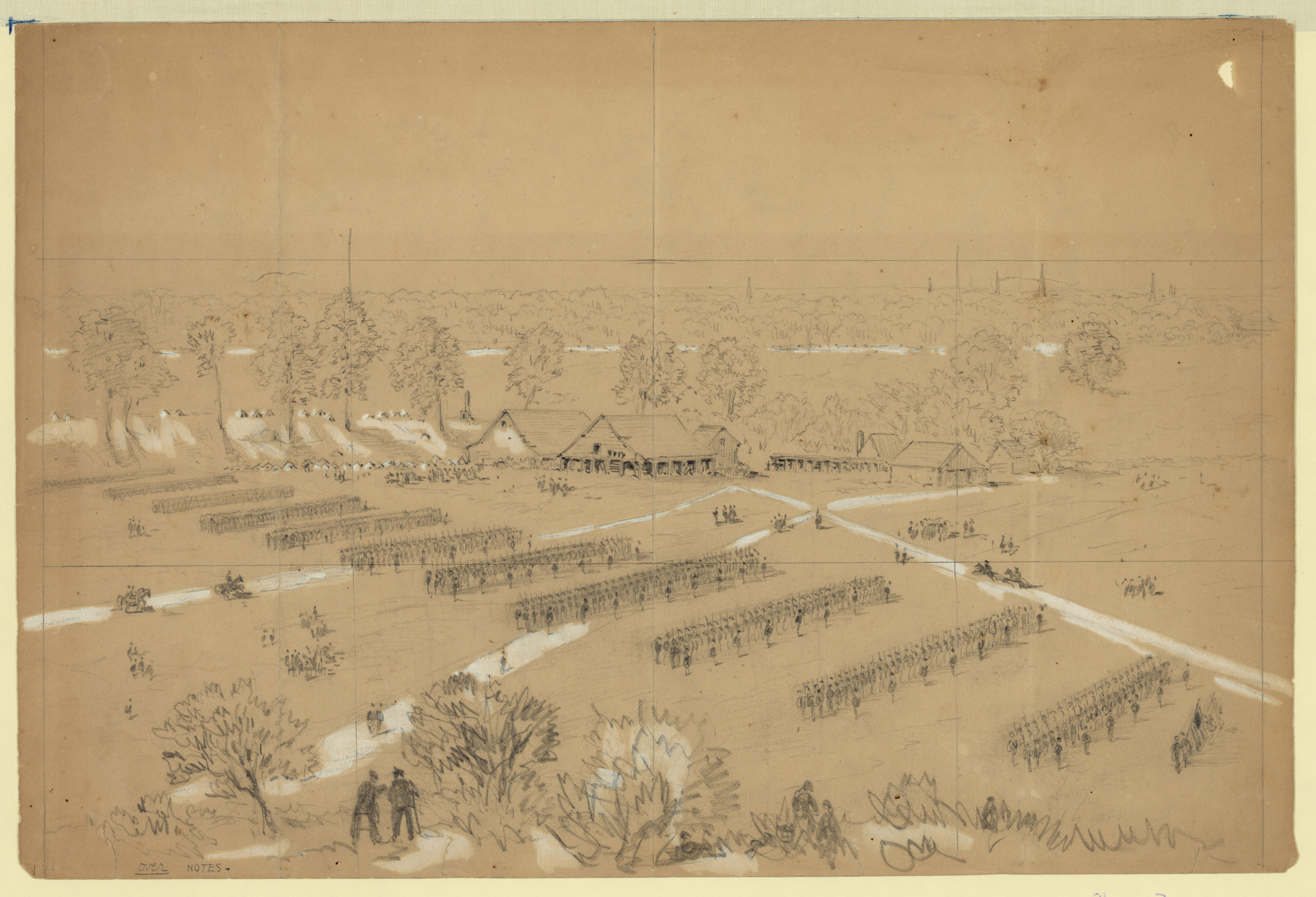
Inspection of the 2nd Pennsylvania Artillery by Gen Ames, by William Waud

Probably as a result of this staff duty and his proximity to the influential Meade, Ames was promoted to brigadier general in the Union Army on May 20, 1863, two weeks following the Battle of Chancellorsville. Ames assumed brigade command in the XI Corps of the Army of the Potomac, relinquishing his command of the 20th Maine to Lt. Col. Joshua L. Chamberlain, who would soon lead the regiment to fame in the Battle of Gettysburg that July.

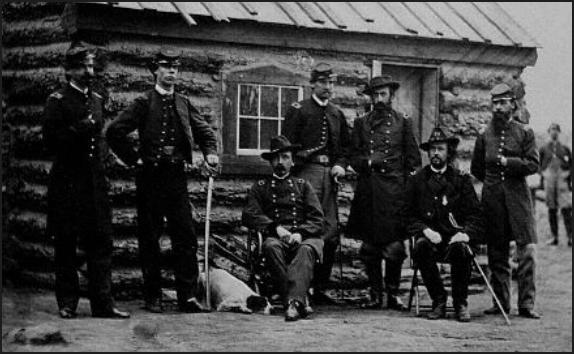
Ames (seated, center) and his staff during the American Civil War

While his experience at Gettysburg did not achieve the renown of Chamberlain's, Ames performed well under challenging circumstances. During the massive assault by Confederate Lt. Gen. Richard S. Ewell on July 1, 1863, Ames's division commander, Brig. Gen. Francis C. Barlow, moved his division well in front of other elements of the XI Corps to a slight rise, now known as Barlow's Knoll. The enemy quickly overran this salient position, wounding and capturing Barlow. Ames took command of the division and led it in retreat through the streets of Gettysburg to a position on Cemetery Hill. On July 2, the second day of battle, Ames's battered division bore the brunt of the assault on East Cemetery Hill by Maj. Gen. Jubal A. Early but was able to hold the critical position with help from surrounding units. At one point, Ames himself participated in the hand-to-hand fighting. After the battle, the men of the 20th Maine presented Ames with their battle flag as a token of their esteem.

Ames returned to brigade command following the battle, receiving a brevet promotion to colonel in the regular army. His division, under the command of Brig. Gen. George H. Gordon, was transferred to the Department of the South, where it served in actions in South Carolina and Florida.

In 1864, Ames's division, which became part of the X Corps of the Army of the James, served under Maj. Gen. Benjamin Franklin Butler in the Bermuda Hundred Campaign and the Siege of Petersburg. In the future, he would become Butler's son-in-law. That winter, the division was reassigned to the XXIV Corps and sent to North Carolina.

Ames as a brevet major general in the Union Army, 1865

During the two years following his service in the Army of the Potomac, Ames shifted between brigade and division command (and even led his corps on two occasions). However, he generally can be identified as a division commander. He led the successful assault in the Second Battle of Fort Fisher (commanding the 2nd Division, XXIV Corps), accompanying his men into the formidable coastal fortress as most of his staff were shot down by Confederate snipers. He received a brevet promotion to major general in the Union Army (and brigadier general in the Regular Army) on March 13, 1865, for his role in the battle.

== Mississippi politics ==
In 1868, Congress appointed Ames as provisional governor of Mississippi. His command soon extended to the Fourth Military District, which consisted of Mississippi and Arkansas. During his administration, he took several steps to advance the rights of formerly enslaved people, appointing the first Black officeholders in state history. During his tenure in 1869, a general election was held in the state, which was one of the last to comply with Reconstruction, despite the prevalence of white supremacist terrorism and violence. The legislature convened at the beginning of the following year.

Around 1868, Ames became an original companion of the Military Order of the Loyal Legion of the United States, a military society of former Union officers and their descendants.

== U.S. senator ==
The Mississippi Legislature elected Ames to the US Senate after the readmission of Mississippi to the Union. He served from February 24, 1870, to January 10, 1874, as a Republican. In Washington, Ames met and married on July 21, 1870, Blanche Butler, daughter of his former commander, then US Representative Benjamin Butler, later a one-term governor of Massachusetts. The couple had six children, including Blanche Ames Ames (the suffragist and cartoonist), Adelbert Ames Jr., and Butler Ames. As a senator, Ames became a talented public speaker, to the point where even some of his Democratic opponents acknowledged his ability.

In the US Senate, Ames was chairman of the Senate Committee on Enrolled Bills. Upon being elected governor of Mississippi, he resigned his seat to assume his duties.

== Governor ==
Blanche Bruce's U.S. Senate credentials, signed by Ames, 1874

Ames battled James Lusk Alcorn, a former Confederate general, for control of the Republican Party, which then had mostly Black voters. White Southerners who sided with the Republican Party were derisively referred to as "scalawags". Southern Democrats painted so-called scalawags and "carpetbaggers" as traitors exploiting the Southern United States and trying to set up "Negro rule." In reality, the promises made by Republicans to rebuild the Southern United States, restore prosperity, create public schools, and expand railroads attracted some white Southerners. The Ames-Alcorn struggle reflected deep fissures in the party. In 1873, both Ames and Alcorn sought a decision by running for the position of governor. The Radicals and most Black voters supported Ames, and Alcorn won the votes of scalawags and moderate Whiggish whites. Ames won by a vote of 69,870 to 50,490.

As governor, Ames fought to cut spending and lower the tax rate with moderate success. The state rate of 14 1/2 mills in 1874 was reduced to 9 1/2 in 1875 and 6 1/2 in 1876.

Even his enemies agreed that the governor had rigorous integrity and was incorruptible and sincere. His appointments included some so-called scalawags and a few former Confederates, but he was often unhappy in Mississippi, while his wife and family spent much of their time in the North, where the weather was cooler and the socioeconomic conditions were more favorable. Ames was proud of his record and considered himself one of the best Republican governors of any of the reconstructed states. This opinion has been generally shared by historians ever since. However, he had little success in winning over his enemies in the party and was quick to attribute sinister motives to them.

His real problems came from the Democratic efforts to undo Reconstruction and gain control. Democrats in Vicksburg launched a coup in December 1874. When the sheriff called on his supporters to restore him to office, a battle ended in the Vicksburg Massacre. Ames had no forces to send and depended on the federal government for troops to reinstate the ousted officials. In the following months, he failed to mobilize a state militia to cope with renewed troubles. By August, the Democratic Party had united to carry the legislative elections that fall and carried out what came to be called the "Mississippi Plan". A riot in Yazoo County drove out the Republican sheriff and resulted in some Blacks and party officers being lynched. The Clinton Riot on September 4 ended with white Democratic paramilitaries riding over the county, shooting every Black person they chanced upon. With no other means of protection, Ames appealed to the federal government for assistance. It was not refused, but authorities urged him to exhaust state resources first.

Ames, unable to organize a state militia in time, signed a peace treaty with Democratic leaders. In return for disarming the few militia units he had assembled, they promised to guarantee a full, free, fair election, a promise they did not keep.

That November, Democrats terrorized a large part of the Republican vote into staying home, driving voters from the polls with shotguns and cannons, and gaining firm control of both houses of the legislature. The state legislature, convening in 1876, drew up articles of impeachment against Ames; with a five-to-one majority and deeply hostile feelings towards him, their investigations "failed to trace a dollar of unearned money to his pockets," one reporter noted. "Whatever Ames may be, he is not dishonest." Though insiders agreed that their case was very weak, removal was certain, particularly after his Black lieutenant governor had been removed and the line of succession led to a Democrat. Rather than face an impeachment trial that would entail great expense, Ames's lawyers made a deal: once the legislature had dropped all charges, he would resign his office, which occurred on March 29, 1876.

== Later life ==
After leaving office, Ames settled briefly in Northfield, Minnesota, where he joined his father and brother in their flour-milling business. During his residence there, in September 1876, Jesse James and his gang of former Confederate guerrillas raided the town's bank, primarily because of Ames's (and controversial Maj. Gen. Benjamin Butler's) investment in it, but their attempt to rob it ended in catastrophic failure. Ames next headed to New York City, then later settled in Tewksbury, Massachusetts as an executive in a flour mill, along with other business interests in the nearby city of Lowell.

In 1898, he was appointed brigadier general of volunteers in the Spanish–American War and fought in Cuba. During the Battle of San Juan Hill the 3rd Brigade of the 1st Division suffered particularly high casualties, with its brigade commander killed and the next two ranking regimental commanders wounded. General Ames was assigned to command the brigade during the Siege of Santiago. He commanded the 1st Division when the V Corps was mustered out in New York.

Several years afterward, he retired from business pursuits in Lowell but continued in real estate and entertainment projects in Atlantic City, New Jersey, and Florida. Ames corresponded extensively with the historian James Wilford Garner during this period; Garner's dissertation viewed Reconstruction as "unwise" but absolved Ames of personal corruption. Ames's widow compiled a collection of her correspondence with Ames, Chronicles from the Nineteenth Century, published posthumously in 1957.

Around 1900, Ames joined the Massachusetts Society of Colonial Wars.

Ames died in 1933 at 97 at his winter home in Ormond Beach, Florida, where he had been a frequent golfing partner of oil tycoon John D. Rockefeller.

At the time of his death, Ames was the last surviving full-rank general who had served in the Civil War. (The last Union general officer, Aaron S. Daggett, lived five years longer than Ames, but he had been a brevet brigadier general of U.S. Volunteers in March 1865, while Ames had been promoted to the permanent rank of brigadier general in the Regular Army about the same period.)

Ames is buried in the Hildreth family cemetery—the family of his mother-in-law, Sarah Hildreth Butler—behind the main cemetery (also known as Hildreth Cemetery) on Hildreth Street in Lowell, Massachusetts. Buried with him are his wife, Blanche Butler Ames, their six children, and the spouses of his son Butler and his daughter Edith.

== Notable descendants ==
Ames was the son-in-law of Civil War General Benjamin Butler.

His daughter Blanche Ames Ames (she married into another Ames family) was a noted suffragist, inventor, artist, and writer. The mansion she designed and built is now part of Borderland State Park in Massachusetts.

His son Adelbert Ames Jr. was a noted scientist and inventor of the Ames Room and the Ames Window.

His son Butler Ames was a businessman and politician, representing Massachusetts in Congress for ten years.

Adelbert Ames was also the great-grandfather of George Plimpton. John F. Kennedy, through George Plimpton, is indirectly responsible for a full-length biography of General Ames. In Profiles in Courage, Kennedy relied on Reconstruction-era historical texts to produce a brief but misleading, false, and devastating portrait of Ames's administration of Mississippi in his profile of Mississippi Senator Lucius Q. C. Lamar. Ames's daughter Blanche Ames Ames, a formidable figure in Massachusetts, bombarded the then-senator with letters complaining about the depiction and continued her barrage after Kennedy entered the White House. President Kennedy then turned to his friend Plimpton to tell Blanche, Plimpton's grandmother, that she was "interfering with state business." Her response was to write a book about her father, Adelbert Ames, in 1964.

== In memoriam ==
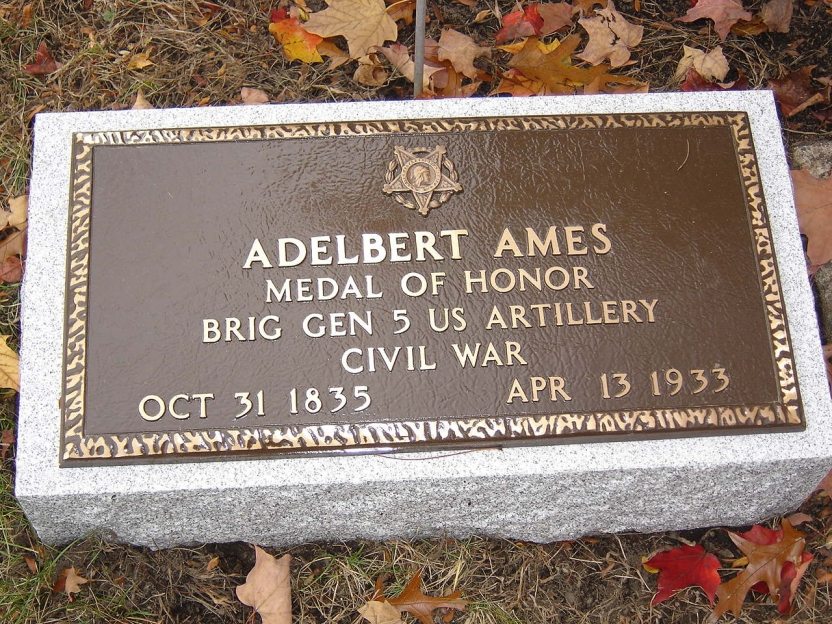
The Medal of Honor plaque at Ames' grave at the Hildreth family cemetery in Lowell, Massachusetts

A Medal of Honor plaque for Ames's gravesite was dedicated at a ceremony honoring Benjamin Butler's 191st birthday, held at the Hildreth family cemetery—the only time of the year it is open to the public—on November 1, 2009.

The United Spanish War Veterans established Camp 19, General Adelbert Ames Post, in Lowell, Massachusetts.

=== Ames Hill Castle ===
After settling in Massachusetts, Ames built a seventeen-room estate in Tewksbury known locally as "the Castle" on Prospect Hill, now called Ames Hill, in 1906. Local developer John D. Sullivan purchased the Ames Hill Castle in 1986 and illegally converted it into a multi-unit rental property. However, Sullivan has been subject to several court rulings for zoning violations on the property, including one in 1991 and again in 1999. In August 2010, Sullivan's attorney brought forth a proposal to Tewksbury's board of selectmen for modifications to the Ames Hill Castle to fall under the Massachusetts Comprehensive Permit Act: Chapter 40B, which would allow him to maintain the property as a multi-unit rental legally. The board elected unanimously to table the proposal, citing several concerns—both with Sullivan's absence (as he had sent his attorney rather than present the proposal in person) and reluctance to meet with residents, and his previous legal issues with the property.

In March 2012, the Ames Hill Castle was unanimously voted "preferably preserved" by the Tewksbury Historic Commission due to its unique architectural features, the current state of preservation, and its association with General Ames. This allowed the commission to invoke a nine-month delay in possible demolition of the property to pursue alternatives. In November, local developer Marc Ginsburg purchased the castle and surrounding plot from Sullivan for $360,000, just as the delay expired. Ginsburg ultimately decided on the castle's demolition to make way for smaller single-family dwellings.

== Popular culture ==
Ames was portrayed by actor Matt Letscher in the 2003 film Gods and Generals.

== Dates of rank ==
Insignia	Rank	Date	Component
No insignia	Cadet, USMA	1 July 1856	Regular Army
	Second Lieutenant	6 May 1861	Regular Army
	First Lieutenant	14 May 1861	Regular Army
	Major	21 July 1861 (brevet)	Regular Army
	Lieutenant Colonel	1 July 1862 (brevet)	Regular Army
	Colonel	29 August 1862	Volunteers
	Brigadier General	20 May 1863	Volunteers
	Colonel	1 July 1863 (brevet)	Regular Army
	Captain	11 June 1864	Regular Army
	Major General	15 January 1865 (brevet)	Volunteers
	Brigadier General	13 March 1865 (brevet)	Regular Army
	Major General	13 March 1865 (brevet)	Regular Army
	Lieutenant Colonel	28 July 1866	Regular Army
	Brigadier General	20 June 1898	Volunteers

== Medal of Honor citation ==
Rank and Organization: First Lieutenant, 5th U.S. Artillery. Place and Date: At Bull Run, Va., July 21, 1861. Entered Service At: Rockland, Maine. Birth: East Thomaston, Maine. Date of Issue: June 22, 1894.

Citation:

Remained upon the field in command of a section of Griffin's Battery, directing its fire after being severely wounded and refusing to leave the field until too weak to sit upon the caisson where he had been placed by men of his command.

== See also ==
- List of American Civil War Medal of Honor recipients: A–F
- List of American Civil War generals (Union)

Party political offices
Preceded by James L. Alcorn	Republican nominee for Governor of Mississippi; 1873	Vacant Title next held by Benjamin King
Political offices
Preceded by Benjamin G. Humphreys	Governor of Mississippi; 1868–1870	Succeeded by James L. Alcorn
Preceded by Ridgley C. Powers	Governor of Mississippi; 1874–1876	Succeeded by John M. Stone
U.S. Senate
Preceded by vacant^{(1)}	U.S. senator (Class 1) from Mississippi; 1870–1874; Served alongside: Hiram R. Revels, James L. Alcorn	Succeeded by Henry R. Pease
Honorary titles
Preceded by Cornelius Cole	Most senior living U.S. senator (Sitting or former); November 3, 1924 – April 12, 1933	Succeeded by Henry C. Hansbrough
Preceded by Rebecca Felton	Oldest living U.S. senator January 24, 1930 – April 12, 1933	Succeeded by Elihu Root
Notes and references
1. Because Mississippi declared secession from the United States in 1861, the seat was declared vacant from 1861 to 1870 when Jefferson Davis withdrew from the Senate
