= Lawrence W. Overton =

American politician

Lawrence W. Overton (born c. 1848) was a state legislator in Mississippi. He was born in Kentucky. He represented Noxubee County in the Mississippi House of Representatives in 1876. Hampton L. Jarnagin and Marshall McNeese were his fellow representatives from Noxubee County. He married Izella Richmond with whom he had three children.

== See also ==
- African American officeholders from the end of the Civil War until before 1900
