= 1873 Mississippi gubernatorial election =

- November 4, 1873
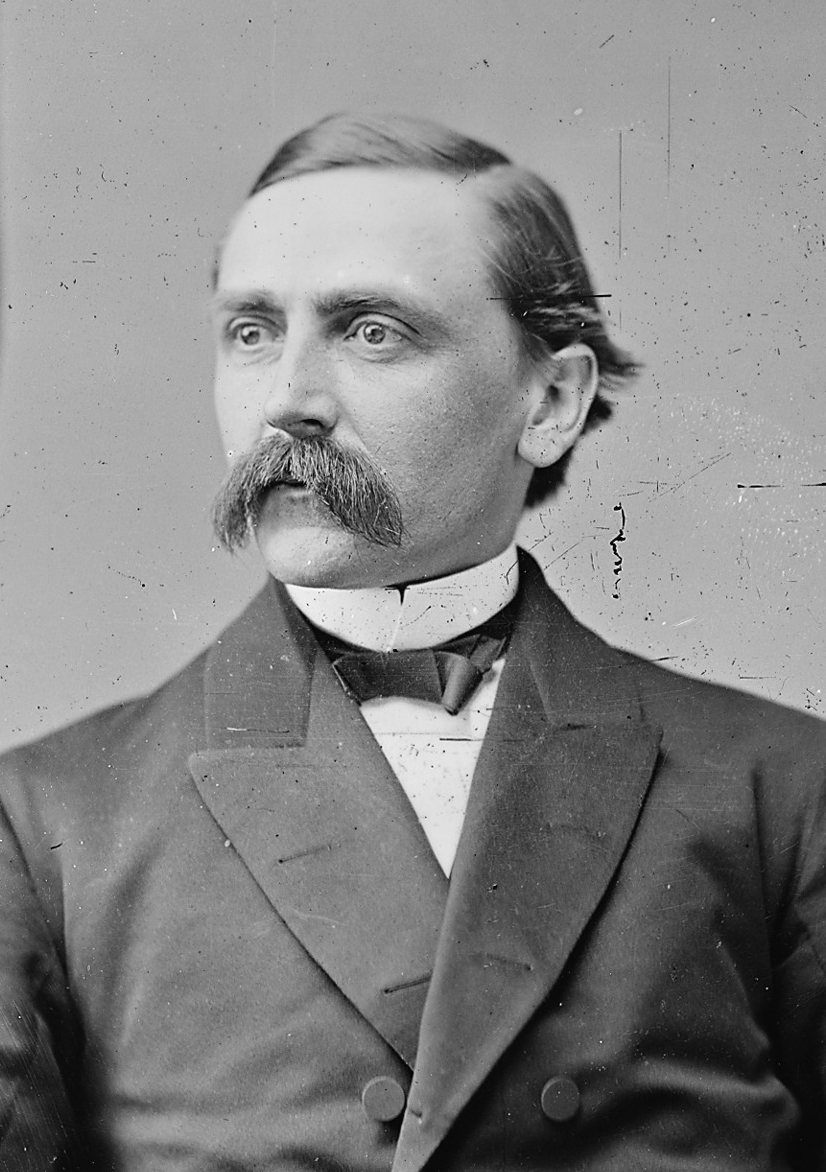

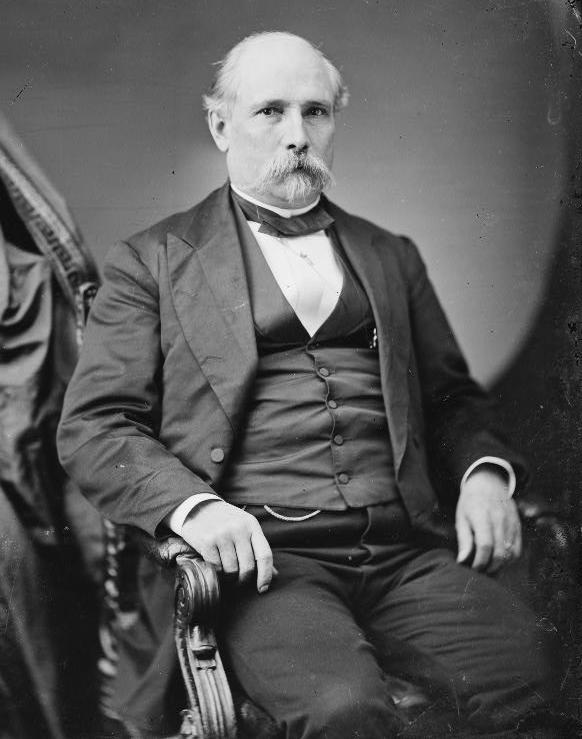
Nominee	Adelbert Ames	James L. Alcorn
Party	Republican	Liberal Republican
Popular vote	73,324	52,857
Percentage	58.11%	41.89%
- County results Ames: 50–60% 60–70% 70–80% 80–90% >90% Alcorn: 50–60% 60–70% 70–80% 80–90% >90%
Governor before election
Ridgley C. Powers
Republican
Elected Governor
Adelbert Ames
Republican

The 1873 Mississippi gubernatorial election took place on November 4, 1873, in order to elect the Governor of Mississippi. This election marked the last time a Republican was elected Governor of Mississippi until 1991, 118 years later.

== General election ==
In the general election, Republican Adelbert Ames, a U.S. Senator who previously served as governor from 1868 until 1870, defeated James L. Alcorn, also a U.S. Senator and former governor. Alcorn's estrangement from Ames, his northern-born colleague, deepened in 1871, as African-Americans became convinced that Alcorn was not taking the problem of white terrorism seriously enough; and, in fact, Alcorn resisted Federal action to suppress the Ku Klux Klan, contending that state authorities were sufficient to handle the task. By 1873 the quarrel had deepened into an intense animosity. Both men ran for governor. Ames was supported by the Radicals and most African Americans, while Alcorn won the votes of conservative whites and most of the scalawags. Ames won by a vote of 73,324 to 52,857. Alcorn withdrew from active politics in the state, emerging to assail the new governor as incapable and an enemy of the people of Mississippi.

=== Results ===
Mississippi gubernatorial election, 1873
Party	Candidate	Votes	%
Republican	Adelbert Ames	73,324	58.11
Liberal Republican	James L. Alcorn	52,857	41.89
Total votes		126,181	100.00
Republican hold			
