= Jarnagin =

Jarnagin is a surname. Notable people with the surname include:

- Clark Jarnagin (1914–1979), American football and basketball coach
- Hampton Jarnagin (died 1887), American politician from Mississippi, brother of Spencer
- Spencer Jarnagin (1792–1851), American politician from Tennessee, brother of Hampton

== See also ==
- William Jernagin (1869–1958), American pastor and activist
