= Henry R. Pease =

American politician

Henry Roberts Pease
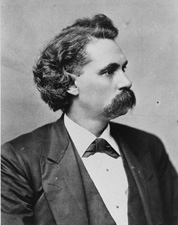

United States Senator from Mississippi
- In office February 3, 1874 – March 3, 1875
- Preceded by: Adelbert Ames
- Succeeded by: Blanche K. Bruce

Member of the South Dakota Senate
- In office January 7, 1895 – January 3, 1897
- Preceded by: Peter Berkman
- Succeeded by: James Ross
- Constituency: 34th district

Personal details
- Born: February 19, 1835 Winsted, Connecticut, U.S.
- Died: January 2, 1907 (aged 71) Watertown, South Dakota, U.S.
- Resting place: Mount Hope Cemetery, Watertown, South Dakota
- Party: Republican

Military service
- Allegiance: United States
- Branch/service: Union Army
- Rank: Captain
- Battles/wars: American Civil War

Henry Roberts Pease (February 19, 1835 – January 2, 1907) was an American lawyer, educator, and politician who served as a United States senator for Mississippi from 1874 to 1875. He also served as the state's first superintendent of education and was a member of the South Dakota Senate for one term.

== Early life and education ==
Henry R. Pease was born in Winsted, Connecticut on February 19, 1835, a son of Sylvanus Pease and Emeline (Roberts) Pease. Pease attended the local schools and Goshen Academy in Goshen, Connecticut. He taught school beginning in 1848, then decided on a legal career. He studied law, was admitted to the bar in 1859 and commenced practice in Washington, D.C.

== Career ==
During the Civil War, he entered the Union Army as a private in 1862 and attained the rank of captain; he was superintendent of education of Louisiana while that state was under military rule and was appointed superintendent of education of freedmen in Mississippi in 1867. In 1869, he was elected state superintendent of education of Mississippi.

Pease was elected as a Republican to the U.S. Senate to fill the vacancy caused by the resignation of Adelbert Ames and served from February 3, 1874, to March 3, 1875. He chose not to run for reelection. In 1875, he was appointed postmaster of Vicksburg, Mississippi by President Ulysses S. Grant, and he established and edited the Mississippi Educational Journal.

Pease moved to Dakota in 1881 and settled in Watertown (now South Dakota) where he was receiver of the United States General Land Office from 1881 to 1885. From 1895 to 1897 he served one term as a member of the South Dakota Senate, representing the 34th district (Marshall and Roberts Counties).

== Personal life ==
Pease died in Watertown in 1907; interment was in Mount Hope Cemetery.

U.S. Senate
Preceded by Adelbert Ames	U.S. senator (Class 1) from Mississippi; February 3, 1874 – March 4, 1875; Served alongside: James L. Alcorn	Succeeded by Blanche K. Bruce
