= Kenneth N. Ogle =

Kenneth N. Ogle (1902-1968) was a scientist of human vision. He was born in Colorado, and attended the public school and college at Colorado Springs. In 1925, Ogle earned a bachelor's degree from Colorado College cum laude. After graduation from college and selection of physics as a career, Ogle spent two years at Dartmouth College, a year at the University of Minnesota, and then returned to Dartmouth College for his Ph.D. degree, awarded in 1930. He was later awarded an honorary medical degree by the University of Uppsala in Sweden.

Ogle remained at Dartmouth Eye Institute to which he was appointed by Adelbert Ames, Jr. from 1930 until 1947 where he spent much of his working life until the institute was discontinued. In 1947, Ogle became a member of the staff of the Mayo Clinic in Rochester, Minnesota, in the Section of Biophysics, working intimately with the Eye Section.

Ogle's research work was largely in the fields of optics and human binocular vision. In 1967, he won the Tillyer Medal, awarded by the Optical Society of America. He died less than two months after retiring from the Mayo Clinic.

== Selected bibliography ==
- Ogle, K. N. (1950). Researches in binocular vision. New York: Hafner Publishing Company.
- Ogle, K. N. (1953). Precision and validity in stereoscopic depth perception from double images. Journal of the Optical Society of America, 43, 906–913.
- Ogle, K. N. (1962). Ocular dominance and binocular retinal rivalry. In H. Davson (Ed.), Visual optics and the optical space sense: Vol. 4 (pp. 409–417). New York: Academic Press.
- Lowe, S. W., & Ogle, K. N. (1966). Dynamics of the pupil during binocular rivalry. Archives of Ophthalmology, 75, 395.
- Ogle, K. N. (1967). On Binocular Rivalry, by W. J. M. Levelt (Book Review). Contemporary Psychology, 12, 340.
- Ogle, K. N. (1967). Some aspects of stereoscopic depth perception. Journal of the Optical Society of America, 57, 1073–1081.
- Ogle, K. N., & Wakefield, J. M. (1967). Stereoscopic depth and binocular rivalry. Vision Research, 7, 89–98.
