= James L. Alcorn =

American politician (1816–1894)

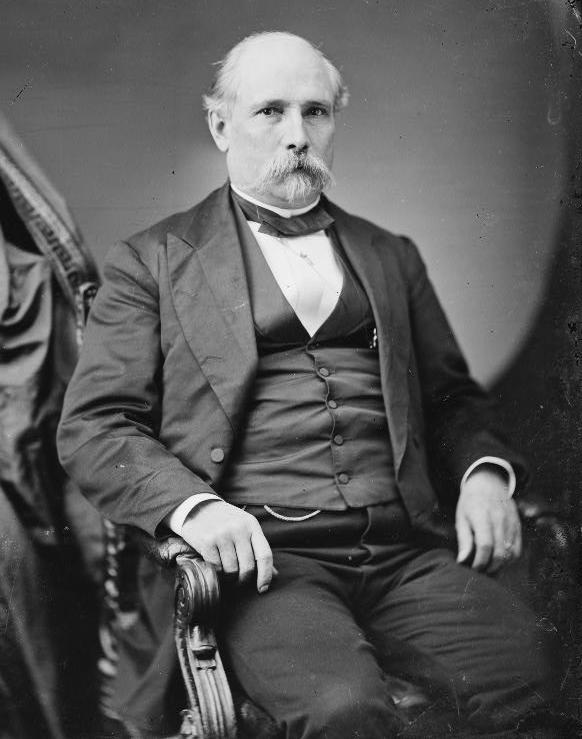
- Alcorn, c. 1860–1875

United States Senator from Mississippi
- In office December 1, 1871 – March 3, 1877
- Preceded by: Hiram R. Revels
- Succeeded by: Lucius Q. C. Lamar

28th Governor of Mississippi
- In office March 10, 1870 – November 30, 1871
- Lieutenant: Ridgley C. Powers
- Preceded by: Adelbert Ames
- Succeeded by: Ridgley C. Powers

Member of the Mississippi Senate
- In office 1848–1854

Member of the Mississippi House of Representatives
- In office 1846, 1856–1857

Member of the Kentucky House of Representatives
- In office 1843

Personal details
- Born: James Lusk Alcorn; November 4, 1816 Golconda, Illinois Territory
- Died: December 19, 1894 (aged 78) Friars Point, Mississippi, US
- Resting place: Alcorn Cemetery, Friars Point, Mississippi, US
- Party: Whig, Republican
- Education: Cumberland College
- Profession: Politician, lawyer

Military service
- Allegiance: Confederate States of America
- Branch: Mississippi Militia
- Years of service: 1861–1862
- Rank: Brigadier-General
- Wars: American Civil War

James Lusk Alcorn (November 4, 1816 – December 19, 1894) was a governor, and U.S. senator during the Reconstruction era in Mississippi. A Moderate Republican and Whiggish "scalawag", he engaged in a bitter rivalry with Radical Republican Adelbert Ames, who defeated him in the 1873 gubernatorial race. Alcorn was the first elected Republican governor of Mississippi.

Although a Unionist, Alcorn briefly served as a Confederate brigadier-general of the Mississippi Militia. Among former Confederates who joined the postbellum Republican Party, only James Longstreet had been of higher rank than Alcorn.

Alcorn would be the last Republican to hold the U.S. Senate class II seat from Mississippi until the election of Thad Cochran, who assumed office in 1978.

== Early life and career ==
Alcorn was born near Golconda, Illinois Territory, to James Alcorn and Hanna Lusk, a Scots-Irish family. He attended Cumberland College in Princeton, Kentucky, and from 1839 to 1844 served as deputy sheriff of Livingston County, Kentucky. He was admitted to the Kentucky bar in 1838 and for six years practicing law in Salem, Kentucky. He served in the Kentucky House of Representatives in 1843 before moving to Mississippi the following year.

Alcorn set up a law office in Coahoma County, Mississippi. As his law practice flourished and his property holdings in the Mississippi Delta increased, he became a wealthy man. In 1850, he built a three-story house at his Mound Place Plantation in Coahoma County, where he resided with his family. By 1860, he enslaved nearly one hundred people and held lands valued at a quarter of a million dollars. Alcorn served in the Mississippi House of Representatives and Mississippi Senate during the 1840s and 1850s being one of the leaders of the then Whigs in the state.

He founded the levee system and was chosen president of the levee board. In the Mississippi legislature, Alcorn pushed for the construction of levees to protect Delta counties from flooding. A levee district was established in 1858 through his efforts. He ran for Congress in 1856 but was defeated. In 1857, Alcorn was nominated for governor by the Whigs but declined.

Alcorn was a delegate to the special Mississippi convention of 1851 called by Democratic governor John A. Quitman, who, as an opponent of Henry Clay's Compromise of 1850 advocated secession. Alcorn joined the Mississippi Unionists to thwart Quitman's plans. Like many other Whig planters, Alcorn opposed secession, pleading with the secessionists to reflect on the realities of the national balance of power. He foretold a horrific picture of a beaten Southern United States, "when the northern soldier would tread her cotton fields, when the slave should be made free and the proud Southerner stricken to the dust in his presence." Alcorn attended the January 1861 Mississippi state secession convention, initially advocating for a cautious approach, but he later shifted to the secessionist side as a consensus developed in favor of leaving the Union. Alcorn was elected to the Committee of Fifteen that drafted the Ordinance of Secession and as he cast his vote he addressed the convention, saying: "I have thought that a different course in regard to the settlement of this great controversy should have been adopted, and to that end I have labored and spoken. But the die is cast—the Rubicon is crossed—and I enlist myself with the army that marches on Rome. I vote for the ordinance."

== American Civil War ==
When secession was declared, Alcorn was appointed by the Mississippi secession convention as a militia brigadier-general. After the resignation of several major generals of the Mississippi State Troops, including Jefferson Davis, Earl Van Dorn, and Charles Clark, Alcorn was next in line for promotion to major-general of the state's armed forces, but was passed over because his political foe John J. Pettus was the governor of Mississippi. Alcorn served in the army for about eighteen months of inconspicuous field service, mainly tasked with recruitment. When his brigade entered the Confederate States Army, Jefferson Davis refused to commission him on account of political differences.

At the start of the Civil War, Alcorn was ordered to proceed with his troops to central Kentucky; then, he was stationed at Fort Donelson, Tennessee. In October 1861, Alcorn raised three regiments of 60-day militia troops, designated as the Army of 10,000, and led his brigade to Camp Beauregard, Kentucky, at which he served under General Leonidas Polk. His field service ended after his brigade was disbanded in January 1862. Alcorn was taken prisoner in Arkansas in 1862, was paroled later in the year, and returned to his Mound Place Plantation in Mississippi. In 1863, he was elected to the Mississippi state legislature, where he joined critics of Confederate President Jefferson Davis.

During the war, Alcorn spent a fortune raising and supplying troops. Additionally, in 1863 his plantation was raided by General Leonard Ross' troops during the Yazoo Pass Expedition, part of the Vicksburg Campaign. However, he managed to preserve part of his wealth during the war by trading cotton with the North. In November 1863, Alcorn wrote to his wife: "I have been very busy hiding & selling my cotton. I have sold in all one hundred & eleven bales, I have now here ten thousand dollars in paper (Green backs) and one thousand dollars in gold." After the war, he was estimated to be among the fifty wealthiest men in the South.

Alcorn lost two sons to the war. His older son, Milton Stewart Alcorn, committed suicide in 1879 after returning home from the war partially deaf and a drunkard. An inscription on the monument at the family cemetery attributes James' death to the "insane war of rebellion" (apparently his father's words). Seventeen-year-old Henry "Hal" Alcorn ran away during the war to join the military against his father's wishes, became ill, and was left behind and captured. He was held in Camp Chase and made his way to Richmond, Virginia after the surrender. He died of typhoid fever en route to Mississippi.

== Postbellum career ==
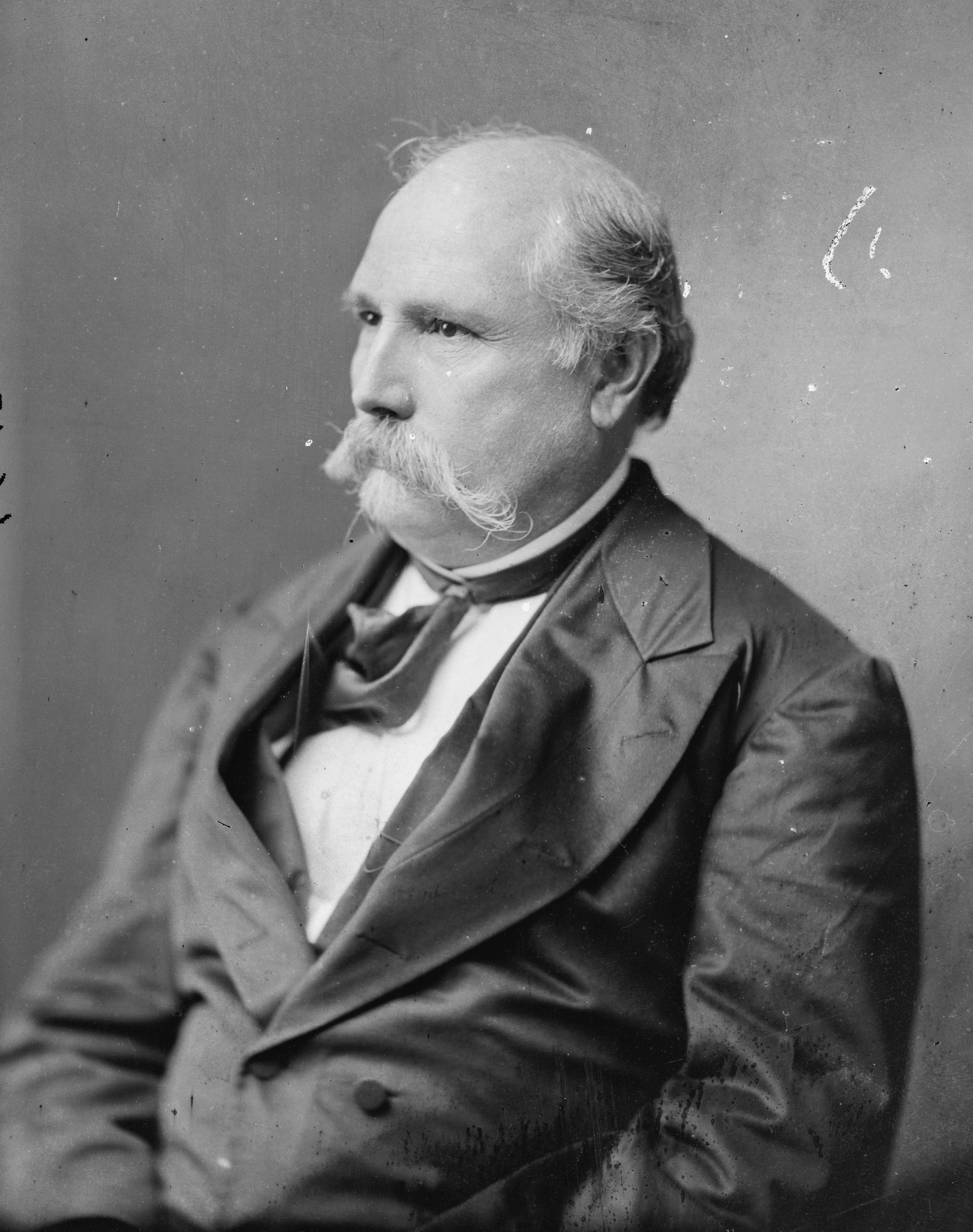
Senator James L. Alcorn

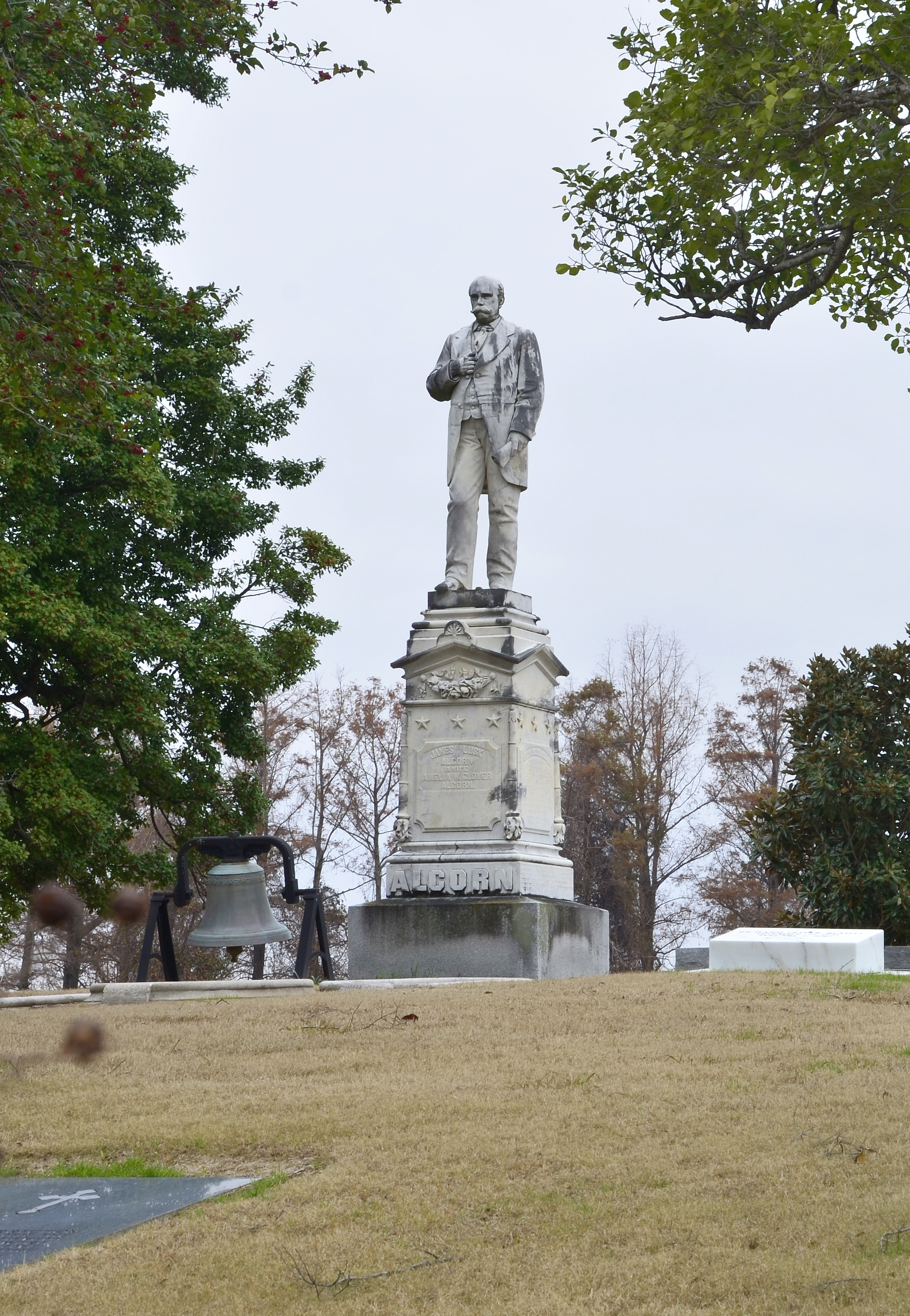
Alcorn's grave in Coahoma County, Mississippi

Alcorn was elected to the U.S. Senate in 1865. However, he was prohibited from being seated in Congress, like all those disqualified from office for insurrection or rebellion against the United States for their participation in the Confederacy. He supported suffrage for freedmen and endorsed the Fourteenth Amendment. Alcorn became the leader of the scalawags, who comprised about a fourth of the Republican officials in the state, in coalition with carpetbaggers, African-Americans who had been free before the outbreak of the Civil War, and freedmen. Mississippi had a majority of African-Americans, the overwhelming majority of whom were freedmen. They had no desire to vote for the Democratic Party, which had carried the 1868 elections by intimidation and violence against blacks.

Thus the vast majority of votes for Republican candidates came from African-Americans, even though most of the Republican state officeholders in Mississippi were whites. In the 1869 election, James Alcorn was elected governor of Mississippi, defeating Ulysses S. Grant's brother-in-law Lewis Dent. Alcorn served as governor until 1871. As a modernizer, he appointed many like-minded former Whigs, some since Democrats. He strongly supported public schools for all and a new college exclusively for blacks, now known as Alcorn State University. He maneuvered to make his ally, Hiram Revels, the institution's president. Irritated at his patronage policy, many Republicans opposed Alcorn. They were concerned as well over his understanding of African-American interests. His hostility to a state civil rights bill was well known; so was his unwillingness to appoint local black officers where a white alternative could be found. One complained that Alcorn's policy was to see "the old civilization of the South modernized" rather than lead a total political, social, and economic revolution.

Alcorn resigned from the governorship to become a U.S. senator, with service from 1871 to 1877, when he was succeeded by L. Q. C. Lamar. He succeeded his ally, Hiram Revels, the first African American senator. Senator Alcorn urged the removal of the political disabilities of white southerners and rejected Republican proposals to end segregation in hotels, restaurants, and railroad cars by federal legislation; he denounced the federal cotton tax as robbery, and defended separate schools for both races in Mississippi. Although a former enslaver, he characterized slavery as "a cancer upon the body of the nation" and expressed the gratification he and many other Southerners felt over its destruction.

=== New South politics ===
Alcorn's estrangement from Senator Adelbert Ames, his northern-born colleague, deepened in 1871, as African-Americans became convinced that the former governor was not taking the problem of white terrorism seriously enough. Alcorn resisted federal action to suppress the Ku Klux Klan, instead contending that state authorities were sufficient to handle the task. By 1873, the quarrel had deepened into an intense animosity. Both men ran for governor. Ames was supported by the Radicals and most African Americans, while Alcorn won the votes of most of the scalawags, moderately Whiggish whites. Ames won by a vote of 69,870 to 50,490. Alcorn withdrew from active politics in the state and accused the new governor of being incapable and an enemy of the people. When a second African-American senator, Blanche Bruce, was elected in 1874, Alcorn refused to follow the customary procedure of introducing his new colleague to the Senate. Bruce was instead welcomed by New York senator Roscoe Conkling, the leader of the congressional "Stalwart" wing.

In 1875, when Reconstruction was fighting for its life against a campaign of violence from the Democrats, Alcorn emerged and led a white force against black Republicans at Friar's Point. The aftermath led to at least five black people being killed.

During the Reconstruction period, Alcorn was an advocate of modernizing the South. Although a believer in white supremacy, he supported civil and political rights for African-Americans. In a letter to his wife (Amelia Alcorn, née Glover, of Rosemount Plantation in southern Alabama), he states that white Southerners must make African Americans their friend or the path ahead will be "red with blood and damp with tears." Alcorn founded the Mississippi levee system and was instrumental in rebuilding the structures after the Civil War.

After he retired from politics, he was active in levee affairs. He was a delegate to the Mississippian constitutional convention of 1890, in which he supported the black disenfranchisement clause that the state's Democrats had introduced in the new constitution. He was twice married: in 1839 to Mary C. Stewart of Kentucky, who died in 1849; and in 1850 to Amelia Walton Glover of Alabama. In his later life, Alcorn practiced law in Friars Point, Mississippi, and lived quietly at his home, Eagle's Nest, in Coahoma County. He was interred upon his death in 1894 in Eagle's Nest at the Alcorn Cemetery in Friars Point. Alcorn commissioned a statue of himself, and after his death, it was placed on his grave.

== Honors ==
Alcorn County, Mississippi is named in his honor, as is the historically black Alcorn State University, the first black land-grant university.

== See also ==
- List of American Civil War Generals (Acting Confederate)

== Sources ==
- United States Congress. "James L. Alcorn (id: A000079)". Biographical Directory of the United States Congress.
- This article incorporates text from a publication now in the public domain: Johnson, Rossiter, ed. (1906). "Alcorn, James Lusk". The Biographical Dictionary of America. Vol. 1. Boston: American Biographical Society. p. 67.
- Harris, William C. (1979), The Day of the Carpetbagger: Republican Reconstruction in Mississippi Archived March 26, 2011, at the Wayback Machine.
- Harris, William C. (1967), Presidential Reconstruction in Mississippi. Louisiana State University Press.
- Pereyra, Lillian A. (1966), James Lusk Alcorn: Persistent Whig. LSU Press, the standard scholarly biography.
- Riley, Franklin Lafayette (1928), "Alcorn, James Lusk" in Dictionary of American Biography, Volume 1.

Party political offices
| Preceded by Beriah B. Eggleston | Republican nominee for Governor of Mississippi; 1869 | Succeeded by Adelbert Ames |
Political offices
| Preceded by Adelbert Ames | Governor of Mississippi; March 10, 1870 – November 30, 1871 | Succeeded by Ridgley C. Powers |
U.S. Senate
| Preceded by Hiram R. Revels | U.S. senator (Class 2) from Mississippi; March 4, 1871 – March 3, 1877; Served alongside: Adelbert Ames, Henry R. Pease and Blanche K. Bruce | Succeeded by Lucius Q. C. Lamar |
