= Adelbert Ames Jr. =

American scientist (1880–1955)

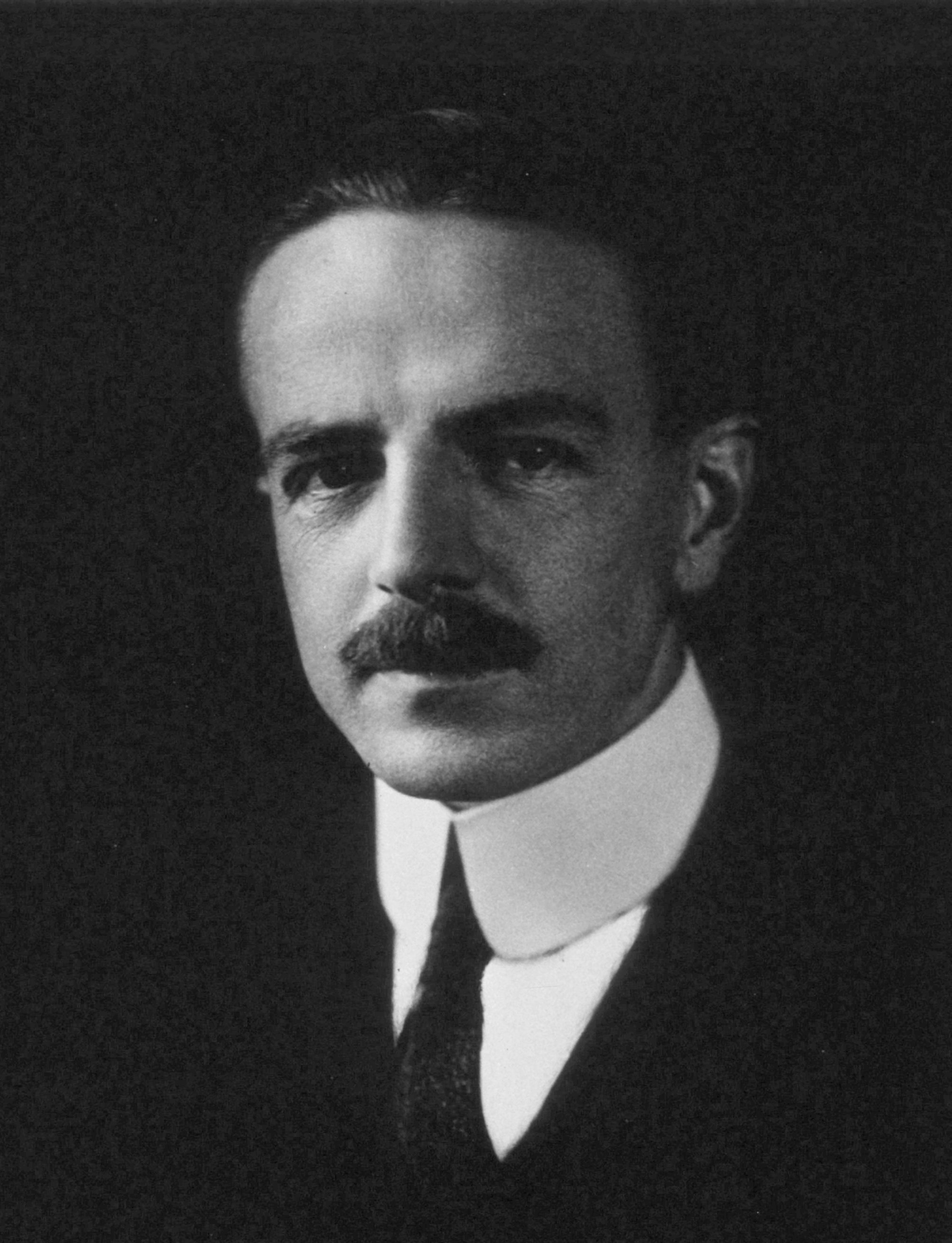
- Born: August 19, 1880; Lowell, Massachusetts, U.S.
- Died: July 3, 1955 (aged 74); Hanover, New Hampshire, U.S.
- Resting place: Dartmouth Cemetery, Hanover, New Hampshire
- Education: Harvard College; Clark University
- Children: Adelbert Ames III
- Parents: Adelbert Ames (father); Blanche Butler Ames (mother)
- Relatives: Benjamin F. Butler (maternal grandfather), Blanche Ames Ames (sister), Butler Ames (brother)
- Awards: Tillyer Medal (1955); Honorary Doctor of Laws (Dartmouth, 1954)
- Scientific career
- Fields: Physics, physiology, ophthalmology, psychology, philosophy, social psychology
- Institutions: Dartmouth College; Dartmouth Eye Institute
- Academic advisors: George Santayana; William James
- Notable students: William H. Ittelson; Hadley Cantril

Adelbert Ames Jr. (August 19, 1880 – July 3, 1955) was an American scientist who made contributions to physics, physiology, ophthalmology, psychology, and philosophy. He pioneered the study of physiological optics at Dartmouth College, serving as a research professor, then as director of research at the Dartmouth Eye Institute. He conducted important research into aspects of binocular vision, including cyclophoria and aniseikonia. Ames is perhaps best known for constructing illusions of visual perception, most notably the Ames room and the Ames window. He was a leading light in the Transactionalist School of psychology and also made contributions to social psychology.

== Formative years ==
Adelbert Ames Jr. was born on August 19, 1880, in Lowell, Massachusetts. His father, Adelbert Ames, was a general in the Union Army during the American Civil War and Reconstruction Governor and Senator from Mississippi; his mother, Blanche Butler Ames, was the daughter of U.S. general Benjamin F. Butler, a controversial military leader, politician, and unsuccessful candidate for the U.S. presidency. Apart from his military and administrative service, General Ames obtained several U.S. patents for pencil sharpeners and other mechanical devices. Ames' sister Blanche Ames Ames was a woman's rights suffragist, and his brother Butler Ames was a politician and Army officer during the Spanish–American War. His son, Adelbert Ames III (1921–2018), was the Charles Anthony Pappas Professor of Neuroscience, Emeritus, at Harvard University. In research papers, Adelbert Ames Jr. is commonly cited as Adelbert Ames II, to prevent his being confused with his father or his son.

Ames attended Philips Academy, Andover, Massachusetts, then went to Harvard College, where he earned a law degree, and where his most influential teachers were George Santayana and William James (whose daughter he was also engaged to, but did not marry). After practicing law for a few years, Ames abandoned it to become a painter. For several years, while collaborating with his sister, Blanche Ames (who was also a painter), the two of them tried to determine if the quality of visual art could be improved by the scientific study of vision. Ames set about improving his knowledge of the optical components of the eye, assuming that once he had mastered them, he would return to painting. As it was, his studies mastered him and Ames made vision his life's work.

Ames went to Clark University in 1914 to study physiological optics, making enough of an impression to be made one of the eighteen founding members of the Optical Society of America in 1916. When the U.S. entered World War I in 1917, he served briefly as a captain in the aviation service, then as the overseer of a machine shop in which prototypes for instruments were developed. While in the army he continued his studies of optics, in part because one of the soldiers in that shop (with whom he became a friend and collaborator) was Charles Proctor, professor of physics at Dartmouth College.

== Dartmouth College ==
After the war, Ames went to Dartmouth College in 1919 to work with Proctor. They decided to construct a large-scale model of the human eye using glass for its various layers, humors, and lens. In 1921, this work led to Ames' first published scientific paper, the award of an honorary Master of Arts degree, and his election as professor of research in a new department of Physiological Optics.

In 1923, Ames began recruiting staff of what was to become the Dartmouth Eye Institute. From Eastman Kodak Company he recruited lens designer Gordon H. Gliddon. More staff joined the department over the years, including Kenneth N. Ogle, with whom Ames worked on stereopsis and binocular vision. Ames was elected a Fellow of the American Academy of Arts and Sciences in 1928.

== The Dartmouth Eye Institute ==
In 1935 the Department of Physiological Optics became the Dartmouth Eye Institute under the overall directorship of Alfred Bielschowsky, with Ames serving as its director of research. Ames garnered support for it from various sources including John D. Rockefeller Jr., the Rockefeller Foundation, and the American Optical Company. The institute at various times employed between thirty and forty staff, including researchers, and clinicians who examined patients' eyes and made eyeglasses.

Research at the institute concentrated on binocular vision, including cyclophoria (the tendency of the eyes to rotate in opposite directions in their sockets) and aniseikonia (in which each eye has a differently sized retinal image of the same object). This latter defect could be corrected by lenses that restored the usual equality of image sizes.

In 1940, Bielschowsky died unexpectedly. Hermann Burian, an ophthalmologist, worked briefly as acting director, and then was relieved by Walter Lancaster. He was not able to exert the influence he wanted, resigning in 1942. According to Herman M. Burian, acting ophthalmologist in chief, Ames "had actually lost his interest in the active work of the Institute, especially its clinical division" and "turned increasingly to the philosophic and social implications of the work". Due to conflicts, staff resignation and after several unsuccessful attempts at reorganisation, on 10 May 1947 the institute was closed.

== Scientific achievements and honors ==
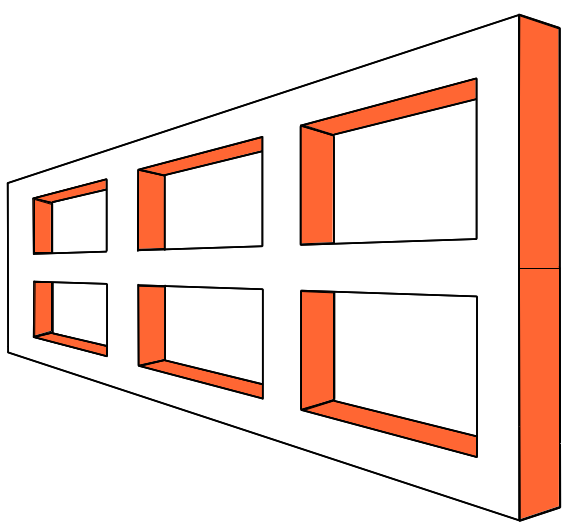
Ames window

Ames is perhaps best known for his eponymous room, window, and chair. These were called "equivalent configurations" by his collaborator William H. Ittelson, defined as "configurations [in which] identical 'incoming messages' can come from different external physical arrangements. In the absence of other information,... equivalent configurations will be perceived as identical, no matter how different they be physically".

Ames also developed the concept of "transactional ambiguity" holding that "mental set" or expectation could materially affect one's perception of visual and other stimuli, as with the Ames trapezoid. This hypothesis extended the impact of mental set from the widely believed impact on one's conclusions about stimuli (the eyewitness phenomenon) to actual perception of the stimuli itself. If true, it calls seriously into question the value of eyewitness reports even by individuals with no prejudices about their observations.

In 1941 Ames began to make notes in the morning on his transactional analysis of perception. In 1960 his collaborator Hadley Cantril published an edited selection from these notes, with a Preface, and included Ames' correspondence with John Dewey.

In 1954, Ames was awarded an honorary Doctor of Laws by Dartmouth. In 1955 he won the Tillyer Medal, awarded by the Optical Society of America. Ames died on July 3, 1955, and was buried at the Dartmouth Cemetery. His name, and that of his siblings, is also inscribed on the gravestone of his parents at the Hildreth family cemetery in Lowell.

In the address given on the presentation of the Tillyer Medal, the president of the society listed 38 books and scientific papers Ames wrote, and 21 patents awarded to Ames.

== Publications in psychology ==
- 1946: "Binocular vision as affected by uniocular stimulus patterns in commonplace environments", American Journal of Psychology 59:333–57
- 1949: Architectural Form and Visual Sensations, pages 82–88 in Building for Modern Man, edited by Thomas Creighton, Princeton University Press
- 1949: (with Hadley Cantril, A. H. Hastorf & W. H.Ittelson) "Psychology and Scientific Research", Science 110: 461–4, 491–7, 517–22.
- 1950: Sensations, their Nature and Origin, Transformation 1: 11,2
- 1950: (with W. H. Ittelson) "Accommodation, Convergence and their relation to Apparent Distance", The Journal of Psychology 30:43–62.
- 1951: "Visual Perception and the Rotating Trapezoidal Window", Psychological Monographs 65(7): #324
- 1953: "Reconsideration of the Origin and Nature of Perception", in Vision and Action, edited by S. Ratner, Rutgers University Press
- 1955: An Interpretive Manual: The Nature of our Perceptions, Prehensions and Behavior
- 1961: Ames A Jr, Cantril H, Engel E, Grace M, Hastorf AH, Ittelson WH, et al. (1961). Kilpatrick FP (ed.). Explorations in Transactional Psychology. New York: New York University Press. doi:10.1037/11303-000. ISBN 0340115963.

== Additional information ==
- Ames family papers Sophia Smith Collection, Smith College

== Bibliography ==
- Behrens, R. R. (1987). The Life and Unusual Ideas of Adelbert Ames Jr. "Leonardo: Journal of the International Society of Arts, Sciences and Technology, 20," 273–279.
- Behrens, R. R. (1994). Adelbert Ames and the Cockeyed Room. "Print magazine, 48:2," 92–97.
- Behrens, R. R. (1997). Eyed Awry: The Ingenuity of Del Ames. "North American Review, 282:2," 26–33.
- Behrens, R. R. (1998). The Artistic and Scientific Collaboration of Blanche Ames Ames and Adelbert Ames II. "Leonardo, 31," 47–54.
- Behrens, Roy R. (1999). "Adelbert Ames, Fritz Heider, and the Chair Demonstration" (PDF). Gestalt Theory. 21 (3): 184–190.
- Behrens, R. R. (2009a). "Adelbert Ames II" entry in Camoupedia: A Compendium of Research on Art, Architecture and Camouflage. Dysart IA: Bobolink Books, pp. 25–26. ISBN 0-9713244-6-8.
- Behrens, R. R. (2009b). "Ames Demonstrations in Perception" in E. Bruce Goldstein, ed., Encyclopedia of Perception. Sage Publications, pp. 41–44. ISBN 978-1-4129-4081-8.
- Bisno, D. C. (1994). "Eyes in the Storm: President Hopkin's Dilemma: The Dartmouth Eye Institute." Norwich, VT: Norwich Press Books.
- Digital Library at Dartmouth. (ND). Blanche B. Marshall Mclane Bruner papers in the Dartmouth College Library. Hanover NH: Dartmouth College. Retrieved May 20, 2005, from https://web.archive.org/web/20050402231154/http://diglib.dartmouth.edu/library/ead/html/ms768.html
- Digital Library at Dartmouth. (ND). Guide to the Records of the Dartmouth Eye Institute 1917–1952[1930–1945] in the Dartmouth College Library. Hanover NH: Dartmouth College. Retrieved May 20, 2005, from https://web.archive.org/web/20050402230617/http://diglib.dartmouth.edu/library/ead/html/da35.html
- Gliddon, G. H. (1955). Necrology: Adelbert Ames Jr. Journal of the Optical Society of America, 45, 1003.
- Gregory, R. L. (1987). Analogue transactions with Adelbert Ames. Perception, 16, 277–282.
- Wade, N. J., & Hughes, P. (1999). Fooling the eyes: Trompe l'oeil and reverse perspective. Perception, 28, 1115–1119.
- Wade, N. J., Ono, H., & Lillakas, L. (2001). Leonardo da Vinci's struggles with representations of reality. Leonardo, 34, 231–235.
