= Lewis Dent =

American politician

Lewis T. Dent (also known as Louis Dent, March 3, 1823 – March 22, 1874) was an American explorer, judge, and politician. He was the brother-in-law of Ulysses S. Grant.

Dent was born in St. Louis, Missouri, in 1823, the son of Frederick Dent and Ellen Wrenshall. He was one of four older brothers of Julia Dent Grant, the future First Lady. Dent was considered to be well-educated, having attended the best schools in St. Louis and studying law. In 1846, Dent served as a civilian clerk to paymaster Major James H. Cloud who accompanied the Mormon Battalion to California during the Mexican-American War. Lewis and his brother John's names were found etched at Signature Rock in Oklahoma.

Dent later married a daughter of Judge Baine. Dent served as a judge on the Superior Court of California until he resigned in 1849. He was a delegate at the first Constitutional Convention of California in 1849. After the shooting death of William Knight on November 9, 1849, John and Lewis Dent took over the operation of Knight's Ferry. The post office for Knight's Ferry was opened on July 28, 1851, and Lewis Dent became its first postmaster. Alongside his brother, Dent ran the ferry and hotel and was named justice of the peace. In 1858, he moved to Stockton, California, and practiced law.

In 1862, Dent joined the military staff of his brother-in-law, General Grant. Between 1863 and 1867, he was engaged in extensive cotton-growing in Mississippi and Louisiana. Dent was captured by the Confederates towards the end of the Civil War and spent about a month in custody. After Grant was elected president in 1868, Dent took up residence at the White House.

Dent ran for Governor of Mississippi in the state's 1869 election, and was nominated as the gubernatorial candidate for the National Union Republican Party ticket. He was supported by conservatives in both parties, and the Democratic party opted not to field a candidate but to support Dent. However, Grant did not support his brother-in-law, as he opposed his white supremacist views. Dent was defeated in his gubernatorial ambitions by the wealthy planter James L. Alcorn. After losing the election, Grant named him minister to Chile. At the end of his life, Dent became a Roman Catholic. He died in Washington, D.C., in March 1874.
