= Joseph Bennett (Mississippi politician) =

American politician

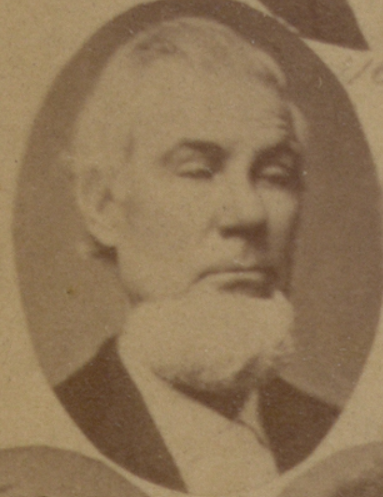
- c. 1874

15th President Pro Tempore of the Mississippi State Senate
- In office January 5, 1872 – January 21, 1874
- Preceded by: William M. Hancock
- Succeeded by: Finis H. Little

Member of the Mississippi State Senate
- In office January 1870 – January 1876
- In office 1852–1854

Personal details
- Born: May 9, 1816 Wayne County, Mississippi, U.S.
- Died: June 25, 1882 (aged 66) Madison Station, Mississippi, U.S.
- Party: Republican (1870-1875)

Joseph Bennett (May 9, 1816 - June 25, 1882) was an American politician in Mississippi. A Republican who eventually switched to become a Democrat, he served in the Mississippi State Senate in 1852 and 1854, and from 1870 to 1876. He was its president pro tempore from 1872 to 1874.

== Early life ==
Joseph Bennett was born on May 9, 1816, in Wayne County, Mississippi. He moved to Rankin County, Mississippi, at the age of 19.

== Career ==
Bennett served as Probate Clerk of Rankin County for 8 years including in 1843. He was a Delegate to the Democratic State Convention in 1847.

He represented Rankin and Smith Counties in the Mississippi State Senate in 1852 and 1854. He was a Delegate to the State Temperance Convention on May 4, 1853. He was elected to represent the 8th District (Hinds, Rankin, and Simpson Counties) in the Mississippi State Senate in 1869, defeating W. F. Fitzgerald and Henry Patterson. He was considered a conservative Republican. He was then re-elected to represent the 11th District, and on January 5, 1872, he was elected to serve as president pro tempore of the Senate. According to one source, Bennett succeeded Ridgley C. Powers as Lieutenant Governor after Powers became Governor. In July 1872, he announced his endorsement of Democrat Horace Greeley in that year's Presidential Election. He was elected again to the 11th District, and resigned his position of President pro tempore on January 21, 1874.

Bennett renounced his association with the Republican Party in August 1875. His term ended in 1876. He died on June 25, 1882, in Madison Station, Mississippi.
