= William M. Hancock =

Mississippi state senator

14th President pro tempore of the Mississippi State Senate
- In office January 1870 – January 1872
- Preceded by: John M. Simonton
- Succeeded by: Joseph Bennett

Member of the Mississippi State Senate from the 9th district
- In office January 1870 – January 1872

Personal details
- Born: 1817 or 1818
- Died: March 8, 1891 (aged 73) Meridian, Mississippi, U.S.
- Party: Republican

William M. Hancock (1817/1818 - March 8, 1891) was a judge and state legislator in Mississippi. His father was Judge Jubal Braxton Hancock.

The Clarion-Ledger identified him as a Radical Republican in 1869.

Hancock served in the provisional legislature in 1870 as president pro-tem of the Mississippi State Senate. He represented the 9th District, or Jasper County, from 1870 to 1871. John R. Lynch's book on Reconstruction reported him to be the only Republican legislator to vote against Hiram R. Revels as nominee to the U.S. Senate. Lynch said Hancock believed an African American could not legally serve in the body.

In 1877, the Clarion-Ledger endorsed his nomination to be deputy collector noting his service during Democrat and Republican state governments.

He served as postmaster in Meridian, Mississippi, having been appointed by presidents Chester Arthur before being ousted by Grover Cleveland, and was reappointed by Benjamin Harrison. He died of pneumonia at 5 AM on March 8, 1891, aged 73. His widow Mary Jane Hancock was nominated to take his place after his death.
