= Ames room =

Optical illusion

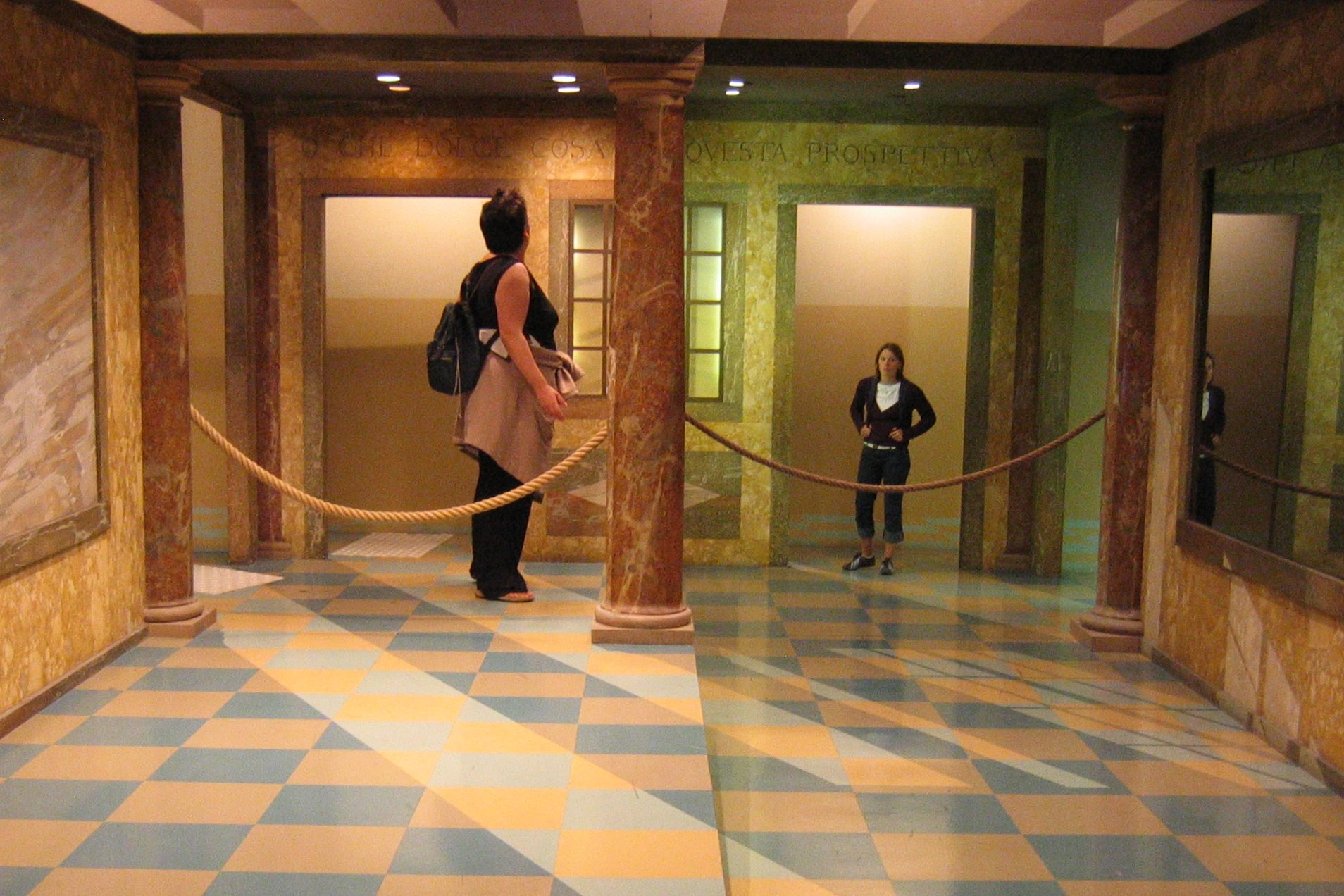
Photograph of two adults standing in an Ames room, apparently with a significant difference in size

An Ames room is a distorted room that creates an optical illusion. Likely influenced by the writings of Hermann Helmholtz, American scientist Adelbert Ames Jr. invented the concept and patented it in 1940. The exact date of the invention has not been established: according to Behrens, "as early as 1934, Ames designed his first 'distorted room'"; other authors suggest 1946.

== Usage and effect ==
A video of a man walking in an Ames room

An Ames room is viewed with one eye through a peephole. Through the peephole, the room appears to be an ordinary rectangular cuboid, with a back wall that is vertical and at right angles to the observer's line of sight, two vertical side walls parallel to each other, and a horizontal floor and ceiling.

The observer will see that an adult standing in one corner of the room along the back wall appears to be a giant, while another adult standing in the other corner along the back wall appears to be a dwarf. An adult who moves from one corner of the room to the other appears to change dramatically in size.

== Explanation ==
A diagram of the true and apparent position of a person in an Ames room, and the shape of that room

The true shape of the room is that of an irregular hexahedron: depending on the design of the room, all surfaces can be regular or irregular quadrilaterals, so that one corner of the room is farther from an observer than the other.

The illusion of an ordinary room is because most information about the true shape of the room does not reach the observer's eye. The geometry of the room is carefully designed, using perspective, so that, from the peephole, the image projected onto the retina of the observer's eye is the same as that of an ordinary room. Once the observer is prevented from perceiving the real locations of the parts of the room, the illusion that it is an ordinary room occurs.

One key aspect of preventing the observer from perceiving the true shape of the room is the peephole. It has at least three consequences:

1. It forces the observer to be at the location where the image projected into the eye is of an ordinary room. From any other location, the observer would see the room's true shape.
2. It forces the observer to use one eye to look into the room, preventing any information about the real shape of the room from stereopsis, which requires two eyes.
3. It prevents the observer from moving to a different location so as to get any information about the real shape of the room from motion parallax.

Other sources of information about the true shape of the room are also removed by its designer. For example, by strategic lighting, the true far corner is as bright as the true near corner. For another example, patterns on the walls (such as windows) and floor (such as a black-and-white chequerboard of tiles) can be made consistent with its illusory geometry.

The illusion is powerful enough to overcome other information about the true locations of objects in the room, such as familiar size. For example, although the observer knows that adults are all about the same size, an adult standing in the true near corner appears to be a giant, while another adult standing in the true far appears to be a dwarf. For another example, although the observer knows that an adult cannot change size, they see an adult who walks back and forth between the true far and true near corners appear to grow and shrink.

Studies have shown that the illusion can be created without using walls and a ceiling; it is sufficient to create an apparent horizon (which in reality will not be horizontal) against an appropriate background, and the eye relies on the apparent relative height of an object above that horizon.

== Related phenomena ==
=== Trompe-l'œil ===
The Ames room has as a predecessor, from as early as the 15th century, the movement in art called trompe-l'œil, in which the artist creates the illusion of three-dimensional space, usually on a flat surface.

=== "Anti-gravity" illusion and gravity hills ===
Ames's original design also contained a groove that was positioned such that a ball in it appears to roll uphill, against gravity. Richard Gregory regarded this apparent "anti-gravity" effect as more amazing than the apparent size changes, although today it is often not shown when an Ames room is exhibited.

Gregory speculated that "magnetic hills" (also known as gravity hills) can be explained by this principle. For such a location in Ayrshire, Scotland, known as the Electric Brae, he found that a row of trees form a background similar to the setting of an Ames room, making the water in a creek appear to flow uphill.

For Gregory, this observation raised particularly interesting questions about how different principles for understanding the world compete in our perception. The "anti-gravity effect" is a much stronger paradox than the "size change" effect, because it seems to negate the law of gravity which is a fundamental feature of the world. In contrast, the apparent size change is not such a strong paradox, because we do have the experience that objects can change size to a certain degree (for example, people and animals can appear to become smaller or larger by crouching or stretching).

=== Honi phenomenon ===
A type of selective perceptual distortion known as the Honi phenomenon causes some married persons to perceive less size distortion of the spouse than a stranger in an Ames room.

The effect was related to the strength of love, liking, and trust of the spouse being viewed. Women who were high positive in this area perceived strangers as being more distorted than their partners. Size judgments by men did not seem to be influenced by the strength of their feeling toward their spouse.

Further study has concluded that the Honi phenomenon does not exist as reliably as first thought, and can be explained as a sex difference influencing perception: women interpreting a larger image as a more meaningful or valuable perception of things than a man's interpretation.

== In media ==
The Ames room principle has been used widely in television and movie productions for special effects to show characters in giant size next to characters in small size. The Lord of the Rings film trilogy uses Ames room sets in Shire sequences to make the hobbits correctly diminutive when standing next to the taller Gandalf.

Ames rooms are used covertly for special effects; other times an Ames room is shown explicitly as a plot point.

- An Ames room is depicted in the 1971 film Willy Wonka & the Chocolate Factory.
- Episode 141 of the science educational television series 3-2-1 Contact demonstrates and explaines the Ames Room.
- In the game Super Mario 64, the room that leads to the Tiny-Huge Island level utilises the Ames room illusion.
- In the 2010 film Temple Grandin, the title character deduces the construction of an Ames room.
- English rock group Squeeze uses an Ames room in their 1987 music video "Hourglass".
- English rock band Status Quo uses an Ames room on the front cover of their 1975 studio album On the Level.
- An Ames room in the 2004 film Eternal Sunshine of the Spotless Mind makes the character Joel appear the size of a child.
- Dr. Eric M. Rogers uses an Ames room to demonstrate how we attach familiar knowledge to the unfamiliar, in his 1979 Royal Institution Christmas Lecture.

== See also ==
- Forced perspective
- Ames window
