= Ames window =

Optical illusion

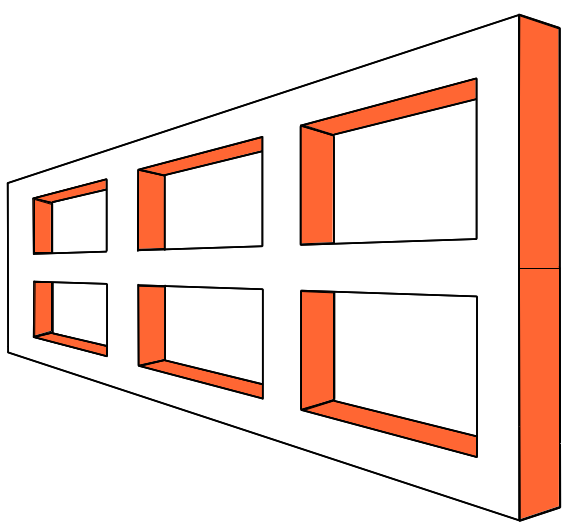
Ames window

The Ames trapezoid or Ames window is an image on, for example, a flat piece of cardboard that seems to be a rectangular window but is, in fact, a trapezoid. Both sides of the piece of cardboard have the same image. The cardboard is hung vertically from a wire so it can rotate around continuously, or is attached to a vertical mechanically rotating axis for continuous rotation. When the rotation of the window is observed, the window appears to rotate through less than 180 degrees, though the exact amount of travel that is perceived varies with the dimensions of the trapezoid. It seems that the rotation stops momentarily and reverses its direction. It is therefore not perceived to be rotating continuously in one section but instead is misperceived to be oscillating. This phenomenon was discovered by Adelbert Ames, Jr. in 1947.

== Legacy ==
During the 1960s, the concept of "transactional ambiguity" was studied and promulgated by some psychologists based on the use of the Ames Window. This hypothesis held that a viewer's mental expectation or "set" could affect the actual perception of ambiguous stimuli, extending the long-held belief that mental set could affect one's feelings and conclusions about stimuli to the actual visual perception of the stimuli itself.

The Ames Window was used in experiments to test this hypothesis by having subjects look through a pinhole to view the rotating window with a grey wooden rod placed through one pane at an oblique angle. Subjects were divided into two experimental groups; one told that the rod was rubber and the other that it was steel. The hypothesis held that there should be a statistically significant difference between these two groups; the steel group more often seeing the rod cutting through the pane while the rubber group more often saw it as wrapping around it. These experiments were popular in university experimental psychology courses, with results sometimes supporting the hypothesis while other times not.

Although literature describing "transactional ambiguity" and the hypothesis of the perceptual effect of mental set has largely disappeared from the scene, it remains an interesting and provocative use of the visually ambiguous demonstrations for which Ames was well known, and if true provides additional scientific foundation for the "eye witness" phenomenon well known in law enforcement and research circles.

Paul Kuniholm’s Ames Trapezoid sculpture, showing binocular rivalry illusion.

== See also ==
- Ames room
- Anamorphosis

== Sources ==
- Behrens, R.R. (2009a). "Adelbert Ames II" entry in Camoupedia: A Compendium of Research on Art, Architecture and Camouflage. Dysart IA: Bobolink Books, pp. 25–26. ISBN 0-9713244-6-8.
- Behrens, R.R. (2009b). "Ames Demonstrations in Perception" in E. Bruce Goldstein, ed., Encyclopedia of Perception. Sage Publications, pp. 41–44. ISBN 978-1-4129-4081-8.
