= Eagles Nest, Mississippi =

- Unincorporated community
- Location within Mississippi Location within the United States
- Coordinates: 34°17′31″N 90°28′02″W
- Country: United States
- State: Mississippi
- County: Coahoma
- Elevation: 164 ft (50 m)
- Time zone: UTC-6 (Central (CST))
  - Summer (DST): UTC-5 (CDT)
- ZIP code: 38639
- Area code: 662
- GNIS feature ID

Eagles Nest is an unincorporated community located in Coahoma County, Mississippi, United States. Eagles Nest is approximately 2 miles (3.2 km) south of Jonestown and approximately 11 miles (18 km) west of Belen. Eagles Nest is named for the former plantation of James L. Alcorn, which in turn received its name from an eagle's nest that was built near the site. The community is located on the former Louisville, New Orleans and Texas Railway. A post office operated under the name Eagles Nest from 1887 to 1909.

== Notable person ==
- James L. Alcorn, governor of Mississippi from 1870 to 1871. Alcorn is buried near the site of his former home in Eagles Nest.
