= Thomas A. Cotton =

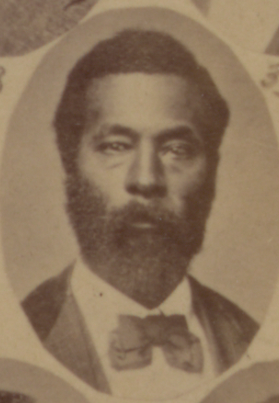

Thomas A. Cotton was a state legislator in Mississippi. He represented Noxubee County in the Mississippi House of Representatives in 1874 and 1875.

Historican Eric Foner lists him as P. A. Cotton in Freedom's Lawmakers and documents him as African American, illiterate, and a laborer.

== See also ==
- African American officeholders from the end of the Civil War until before 1900
