= Ridgley C. Powers =

American politician (1836–1912)

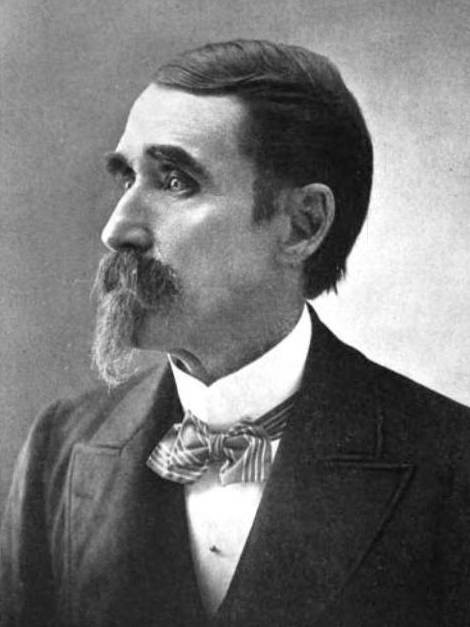

29th Governor of Mississippi
- In office November 30, 1871 – January 4, 1874
- Lieutenant: Alexander K. Davis
- Preceded by: James L. Alcorn
- Succeeded by: Adelbert Ames

7th Lieutenant Governor of Mississippi
- In office 1870–1871
- Governor: James L. Alcorn
- Preceded by: Office re-created
- Succeeded by: Alexander K. Davis

Personal details
- Born: Ridgley Ceylon Powers; December 24, 1836 Mecca, Ohio
- Died: November 11, 1912 (aged 75) Los Angeles, California
- Party: Republican
- Education: University of Michigan; Union College

Ridgley Ceylon Powers (December 24, 1836 – November 11, 1912) was a U.S. Army officer in the American Civil War who was Mississippi's lieutenant governor in 1870 before becoming Governor from 1871 to 1874. He succeeded James L. Alcorn as Governor when Alcorn resigned to become a U.S. senator.

== Background ==
Powers was born in Mecca, Ohio, on Christmas Eve. He graduated from the University of Michigan and completed post-graduate work at Union College in Schenectady, New York, in 1862.

== Wartime ==
In the second year of the American Civil War, Powers enlisted in the United States Army as a private. He became a second lieutenant and later a captain in the 125th Ohio Volunteer Infantry. He fought in the Third Battle of Chattanooga and in the Atlanta campaign before returning with his regiment to Tennessee for much of the remainder of the war. He ended his military service as a colonel at the end of the conflict.

== Governorship ==
In 1865, Powers settled in Noxubee County, Mississippi, as a cotton planter, later becoming Sheriff. During Reconstruction, he was elected the seventh lieutenant governor and began his term in 1870. Governor James L. Alcorn resigned the following year to accept a U.S. Senate seat, thereby making Powers the acting governor; he finished the unexpired term ending in 1874.

== Death ==
Powers died in Los Angeles, California in 1912.

Political offices
Preceded by Office re-created	Lieutenant Governor of Mississippi; 1870-1871	Succeeded by Alexander K. Davis
Preceded by James L. Alcorn	Governor of Mississippi; 1871-1874	Succeeded by Adelbert Ames
