= Hampton Jarnagin =

Mississippi legislator

Hampton L. Jarnagin (1811/1812 – 1887) was an American lawyer, judge, and state legislator in Mississippi.

Jarnagin was born in 1811 or 1812 in Eastern Tennessee. Spencer Jarnagin was his brother.

Jarnagin built Belle Oakes in 1844. He spoke of the amnesty granted by U.S. president Andrew Johnson to Confederates. At Mississippi's 1865 Constitutional Convention, he said Mississippi was abolitionized. In 1872, he gave extensive testimony on conditions, events, and affairs he witnessed before and after the American Civil War at a congressional inquiry.

Jarnagin represented Noxubee County in the Mississippi House of Representatives. He represented the 17th District in the Mississippi State Senate from 1880 to 1884.

Jarnagin died in 1887.
