= J. W. Chandler =

Mississippi politician

John Wilson Chandler was a state legislator in Mississippi. From 1872 to 1876 he represented Noxubee County in the Mississippi House of Representatives.

He was a district delegate at the 1872 Republican National Convention. He served on the Judiciary Committee. He was a census official in 1889.
